= Tampoi =

Tampoi or Tampoy can refer to:

Tampoi

- Baccaurea macrocarpa, a tropical fruit tree found in Southeast Asia
- Tampoi, Johor, a suburb of Johor Bahru, Malaysia

Tampoy

- Syzygium jambos, an ornamental and fruit tree of Southeast Asia
- Tampoy, part of the City of Malolos, Philippines
