= Pierardia =

Pierardia can be either of the two following genera:

- Pierardia Raf., the junior homonym, now a synonym of the orchid genus Dendrobium
- Pierardia Roxb. ex Jack, the senior homonym, now a synonym of the genus Baccaurea of the family Phyllanthaceae
