= Baccaurea glabrifolia =

Conservation status
- Vulnerable (IUCN 2.3)

Scientific classification
- Kingdom: Plantae
- Clade: Tracheophytes
- Clade: Angiosperms
- Clade: Eudicots
- Clade: Rosids
- Order: Malpighiales
- Family: Phyllanthaceae
- Genus: Baccaurea
- Species: B. glabrifolia

Binomial name
- Baccaurea glabrifolia Pax. & Hoffm.

Species of flowering plant

Baccaurea glabrifolia is a species of plant in the family Phyllanthaceae. It is endemic to the Philippines.
