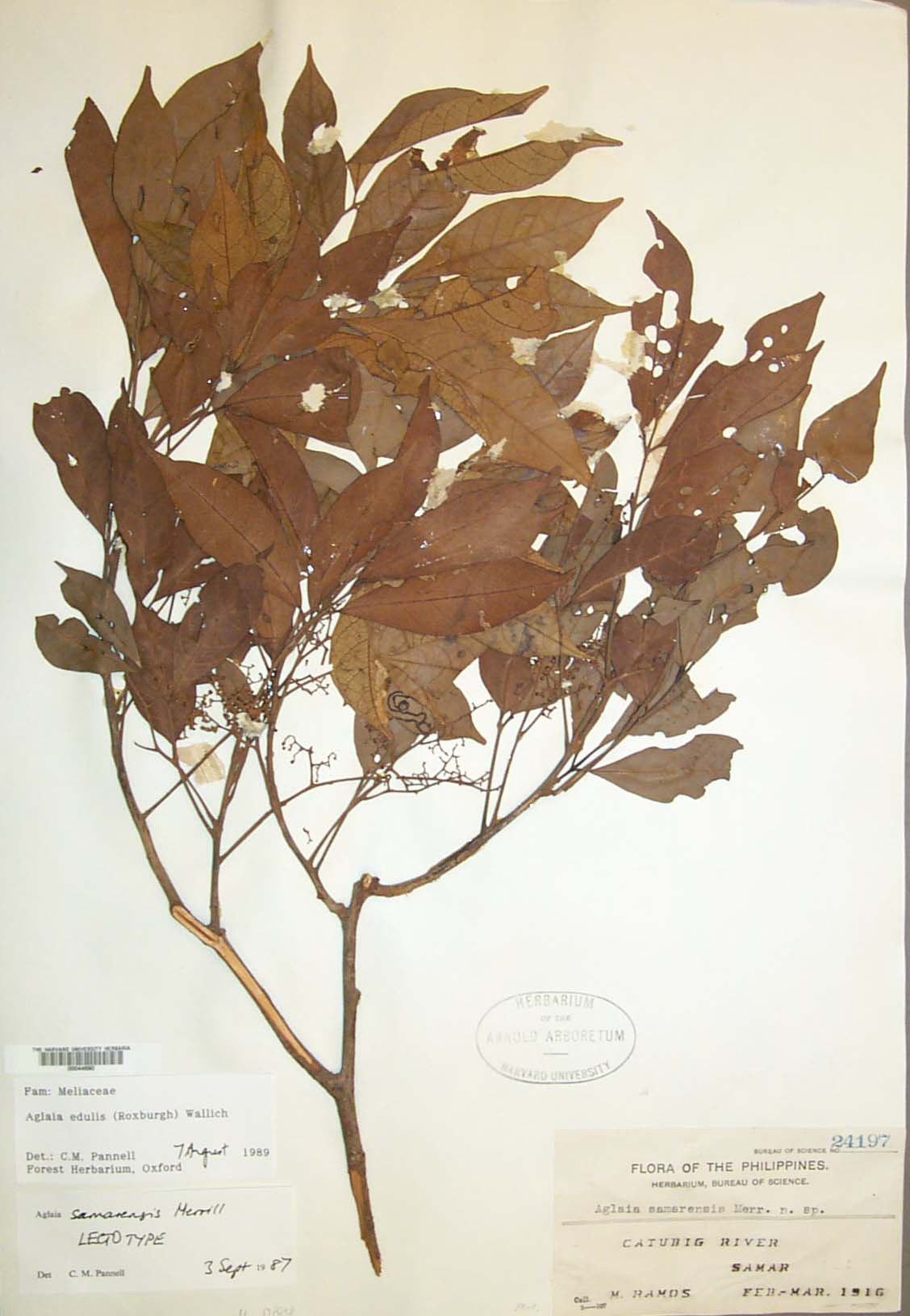
- Herbarium specimen of Aglaia edulis

Conservation status
- Near Threatened (IUCN 2.3)

Scientific classification
- Kingdom: Plantae
- Clade: Embryophytes
- Clade: Tracheophytes
- Clade: Spermatophytes
- Clade: Angiosperms
- Clade: Eudicots
- Clade: Rosids
- Order: Sapindales
- Family: Meliaceae
- Genus: Aglaia
- Species: A. edulis

Binomial name
- Aglaia edulis (Roxb.) Wall.

Synonyms
- 37 synonyms: Milnea edulis Roxb.; Aglaia acida Koord. & Valeton; Aglaia barberi Gamble; Aglaia cambodiana Pierre; Aglaia curranii Merr.; Aglaia diffusa Merr.; Aglaia indica (Hook.f.) Harms; Aglaia khasiana Hiern; Aglaia latifolia Miq.; Aglaia latifolia var. teysmannii Koord. & Valeton; Aglaia magnifoliola C.DC.; Aglaia minahassae Koord.; Aglaia montrouzieri Pierre; Aglaia motleyana Stapf ex Ridl.; Aglaia mucronulata C.DC.; Aglaia oblonga Pierre; Aglaia pirifera Hance; Aglaia rugosa Pierre; Aglaia samarensis Merr.; Aglaia sulingi Blume; Aglaia testicularis C.Y.Wu; Aglaia undulata Miq.; Aglaia verrucosa C.DC.; Amoora verrucosa C.DC.; Beddomea indica Benth. & Hook.f.; Beddomea sarmentosa Hook.f. ex Bedd.; Camunium bengalense Buch.-Ham. ex Wall.; Lepiaglaia montrouzieri Pierre; Milnea cambodiana Pierre; Milnea pirifera (Hance) Pierre; Milnea racemosa (Dennst.) Peterm.; Milnea rugosa Pierre; Milnea sulingi (Blume) Teijsm. & Binn.; Milnea undulata Wall. ex C.DC.; Milnea verrucosa (C.DC.) Pierre; Nyalelia racemosa Dennst. ex Kostel.; Achras retusa Dennst.

= Aglaia edulis =

Species of tree from tropical Asia

Aglaia edulis is a tree species of plant in the family Meliaceae. It occurs in Tropical Asia from India to Yunnan and South-Central China. The wood and timber are used for various purposes.

== Distribution ==
It is found in the Lesser Sunda Islands, Maluku Islands, Sulawesi, Java, Sumatra in Indonesia; Philippines; Malaysia; Thailand; Cambodia; Vietnam; Hainan, the south-central region and Yunnan in China; Laos; Myanmar; Bangladesh; Nicobar Islands, Assam, Meghalaya, Tripura, Arunachal Pradesh, Eastern Himalaya and other parts of India; and Bhutan.

== Conservation status ==
It is regarded as Near Threatened in status as the population is severely fragmented, there is a continuing decline of mature individuals and there is a continuing decline in the area, extent and/or quality of habitat. As noted below, it has critically endangered status in Bangladesh.

== Descriptions and habitat ==
It grows as an 8–20 m (26–66 ft) tall tree in dense, semi-evergreen and evergreen forests of Cambodia. In the Phnom Kulen National Park, Siem Reap Province, it is one of the (12 or more) dominant canopy and emergent tree taxa in the common Evergreen Forest formation.

In Zhōngguó/China it occurs a tree some 5–9 m (16–30 ft) tall, with a diameter at breast height of 30 cm. It has rufous bark, though young branches are glabrous and pale brown. Leaves are 25 to 30 cm (9.8 to 11.8 in). The fruit, c.5.5 by 3-3.5 cm is brown and elliptic, 1 to 3 seeds. It flowers and fruits from November to January. The tree grows in evergreen broad-leaved forests at 1,200–1,800 m (3,900–5,900 ft) elevation on limestone hills, particularly in Malipo County, Yunnan.

The International Union for Conservation of Nature/IUCN has the plant as a rare scattered tree primarily found along rocky coasts in evergreen and primary forest.

A. edulis trees have one of the largest diameter sizes (50–70 cm) in the Dryland Forest and Swamp Peat Forest formations in the Muara Kendawangan Nature Reserve, Ketapang Regency, West Kalimantan, Indonesia (0 to 30m a.s.l.). It occurs in the Baccaurea lanceolata-Calophyllum inophyllum association of taxa.

In Doi Suthep–Pui National Park, northern Thailand, it is one of the upper canopy trees of the Evergreen Forest formation, growing from 1,350 to 1,500 m (4,430 to 4,920 ft) elevation.

The species grows amongst the 16–22m high middle layer of the three levels of dense vine-tangled canopy occurring in the Dry Evergreen Forest community at the Sakae Rat Environmental Research Station, Pak Thong Chai District, northeastern Thailand.

At Hazarikhil Wildlife Sanctuary, Chittagong Division, the tree's presence in Bangladesh was established for the first time since the only previous record made by Joseph Dalton Hooker (Hook.f.) in 1875. It had been thought extinct, it is now given a critically endangered status.

== Vernacular names ==
Vernacular names for the plant include:

- langsat-lotung (Indonesian)
- khangkhao, kholaen, tokbrai (Thai)
- bâng' kew, bângkô:ng, -mchu:l (="needle"), bangkuv, bangkuv (hobphlae) (Khmer)
- gội dịu, ngâu dịu (Vietnamese)
- 马肾果, ma shen guo (Chinese)
- ചുവന്നകിൽ, malkaraikil (Malayalam)

== Uses ==
In Cambodia, the fruits of the trees known as -mchu:l are eaten, when ripe, while the wood is used in temporary constructions and for firewood. The timber of the trees known as bâng' kew, bângkô:ng or bangkuv (which is common in Pursat Province and also found in Stung Treng Province) is valued highly in construction, even though it is a Third-class (lowest-grade) timber, with very low royalties due for extraction. The timber of this species is red, hard, and usually used for making carts, boats, furniture, etc.
