= Bang Khun Non subdistrict =

Bang Khun Non บางขุนนนท์
- Khwaeng
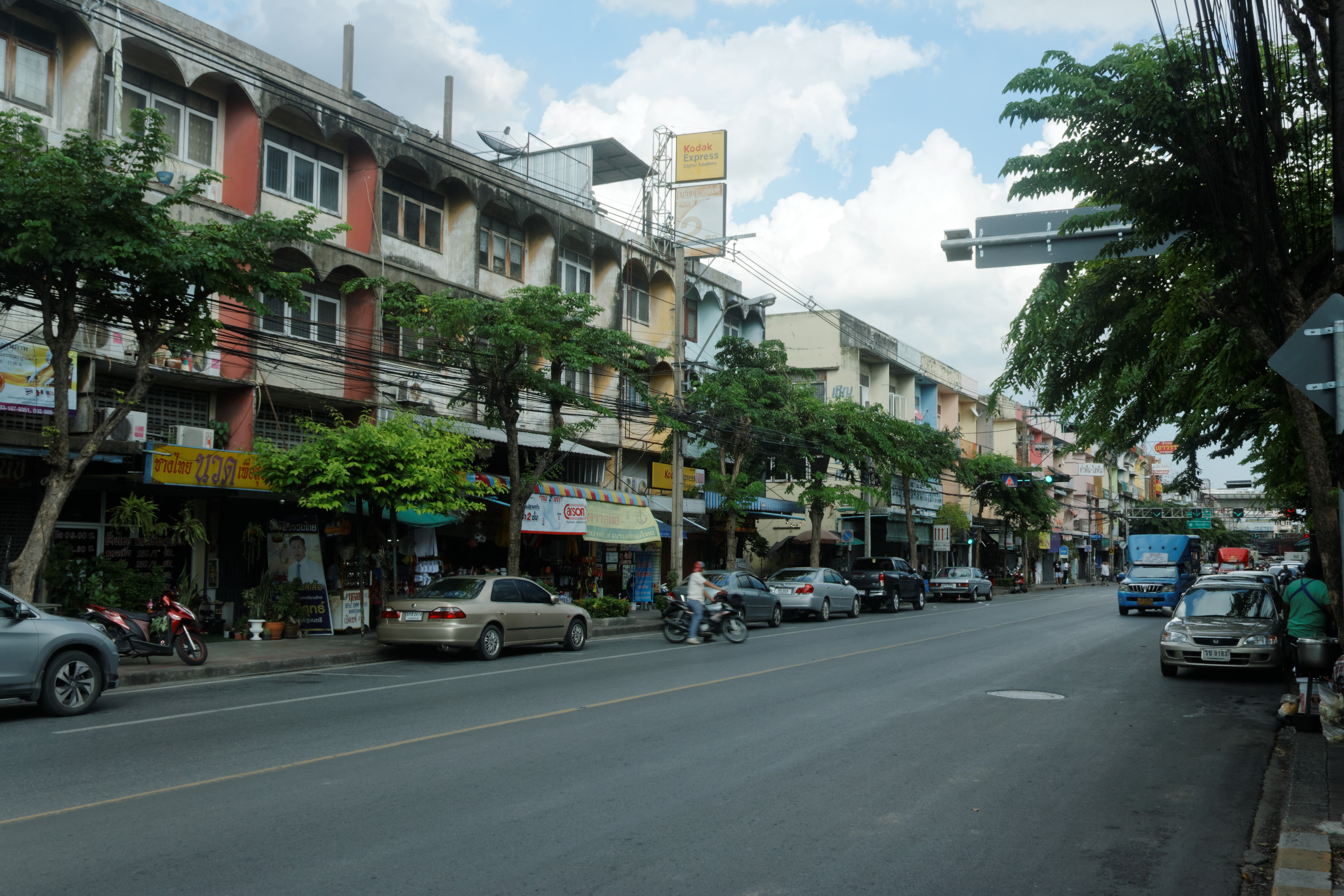
- Bang Khun Non Road, the main road of the subdistrict

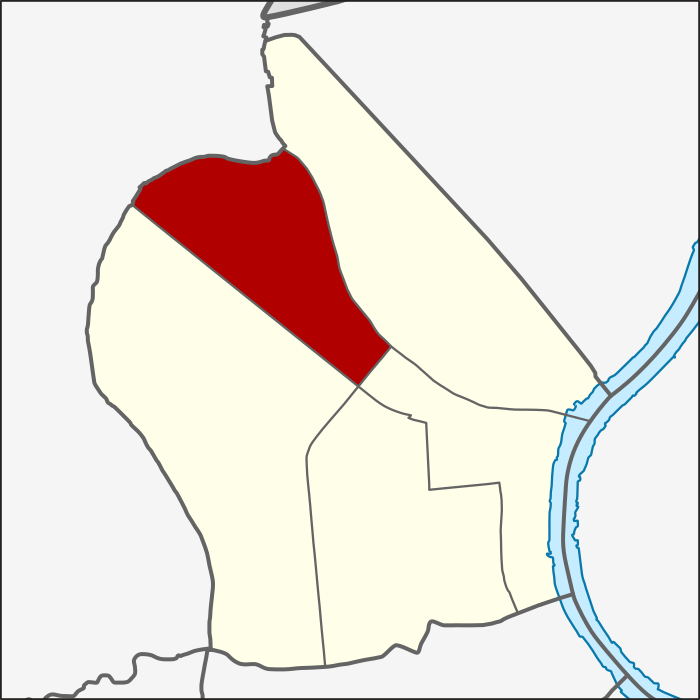
- Location in Bangkok Noi District
- Country: Thailand
- Province: Bangkok
- Khet: Bangkok Noi

Area
  - Total: 1.492 km^{2} (0.576 sq mi)

Population (2018)
  - Total: 9,549
- Time zone: UTC+7 (ICT)
- Postal code: 10700
- TIS 1099: 102006

Bang Khun Non (Thai: บางขุนนนท์, pronounced [bāːŋ kʰǔn nōn]) is a khwaeng (subdistrict) of Bangkok Noi District, in Bangkok, Thailand. In 2018, it had a total population of 9,549 people.

== History ==
Its name comes from Khlong Bang Khun Non, a canal that runs through the area. In the old days, Bang Khun Non was an orchard-filled district. The main occupation of local residents was fruit farming, and traditional orchards were organized in raised embankments with narrow furrows for planting.

Popular fruits grown in the area included durian, pomelo, marian plum, Burmese grape, mangosteen, rose apple, coconut, mango, and others. Durian, in particular, was so well known that it gave rise to a famous local variety known as "Bang Khun Non Durian", often mentioned alongside the "Taling Chan Durian" from the neighbouring Taling Chan district.

Today, the Bangkok Noi District Office has preserved these native durian varieties in Chaloem Phrakiat 80 Phansa Public Park, located diagonally across from the district office on Bang Khun Non Road.

In addition, Bang Khun Non is home to a historic temple, Wat Si Sudaram (formerly Wat Chi Pakhao), which served as the childhood school of Thailand's famous poet, Sunthorn Phu.

Nowadays, the lifestyle of local people has changed. Roads have replaced canals as the primary means of transportation. As demand for residential land has increased, traditional orchards have gradually disappeared, giving way to plant nurseries and decorative gardens for commercial purposes.

== Transportation ==
The main road running through Bang Khun Non is Bang Khun Non, a road that parallels the canal Khlong Bangkok Noi to the northwest from Bang Khun Non Junction up to the bridge over Khlong Chak Phra, a boundary between Bang Khun Non Subdistrict, Bangkok Noi District and Khlong Chak Phra Subdistrict, Taling Chan District. Then itself continuing on to the same direction as Chaiyaphruek Road.

The road was officially named Bang Khun Non-Taling Chan Road, beginning at Bang Khun Non Junction from Charan Sanit Wong Road on the inbound side, which the total length is 1.95 km (1.2 mi) of road surface width 14 m (45.9 ft).

Bordering the road are (except Wat Si Sudaram, Chaloem Phrakiat 80 Phansa Public Park, Bangkok Noi District Office) Wat Mai Yai Paen, Wat Bang Khun Non, the Rubber Authority of Thailand, Wat Chao Am and the Legal Execution Department.

The road was once the residence of Field Marshal Praphas Charusathien a high-ranking military officer and politician who played a large role in Thai politics in the 1970s.

Moreover, both sides of the road feature food vendors, selling local dishes such as fish ball noodles, pork tom yum noodles with ivy gourd leaves, boat noodles, braised beef noodles, grilled chicken and spicy papaya salad, etc.

The road served by BMTA bus no.79 and affiliated bus no.57 as well as several songthaew (Thai style minibus) lines.
