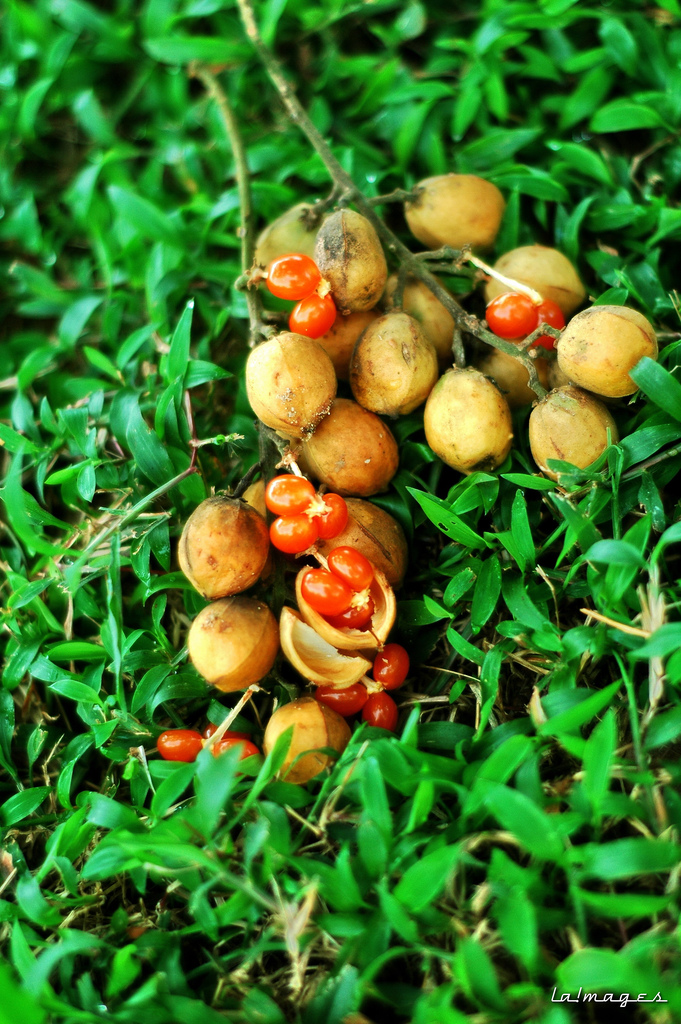

Conservation status
- Least Concern (IUCN 3.1)

Scientific classification
- Kingdom: Plantae
- Clade: Embryophytes
- Clade: Tracheophytes
- Clade: Spermatophytes
- Clade: Angiosperms
- Clade: Eudicots
- Clade: Rosids
- Order: Malpighiales
- Family: Phyllanthaceae
- Genus: Baccaurea
- Species: B. polyneura

Binomial name
- Baccaurea polyneura Hook.f.

Synonyms
- Baccaurea cordata Merr.; Baccaurea hookeri Gage; Baccaurea kunstleri King ex Gage

= Baccaurea polyneura =

Species of flowering plant

Baccaurea polyneura is a species of plant in the family Phyllanthaceae. It is native to Sumatra, Borneo, Java, Peninsular Malaysia, Singapore and Peninsular Thailand. The fruit, called jentik, is edible, if sour, and is locally harvested and sold.

== Description ==
Baccaurea polyneura has a dense crown, growing up to 5-30 meters tall. The plant's bole can be 10-90 cm in diameter and has small buttresses. Baccaurea polyneura grows to a mid-canopy of primary, secondary and swamp rain forests at elevations from 20 to 600 meters. As such, they are mainly found on hillsides and ridges, and sometimes on alluvial sites.

When unripe, the fruit takes an evergreen color with its dioecious tree growing up to 11-32 meters in height. When ripe and fresh, the fruit takes a more bark brown to white brown to red brown. As it dries, it appears brown.

== Uses ==
The edible fruit is collected from the wild and can sometimes be found in local markets.

== Cultivation ==
Baccaurea polyneura grows in the wild on sand, clay, loam and granite soils. It flowers and fruits at a year old. As a dioecious plant, it requires both a male and female counterpart to be grown to cultivate fruit and seed.
