= Khlong Bangkok Noi =

Canal in Bangkok, Thailand

Coordinates: 13°45′47.0″N 100°28′45.0″E

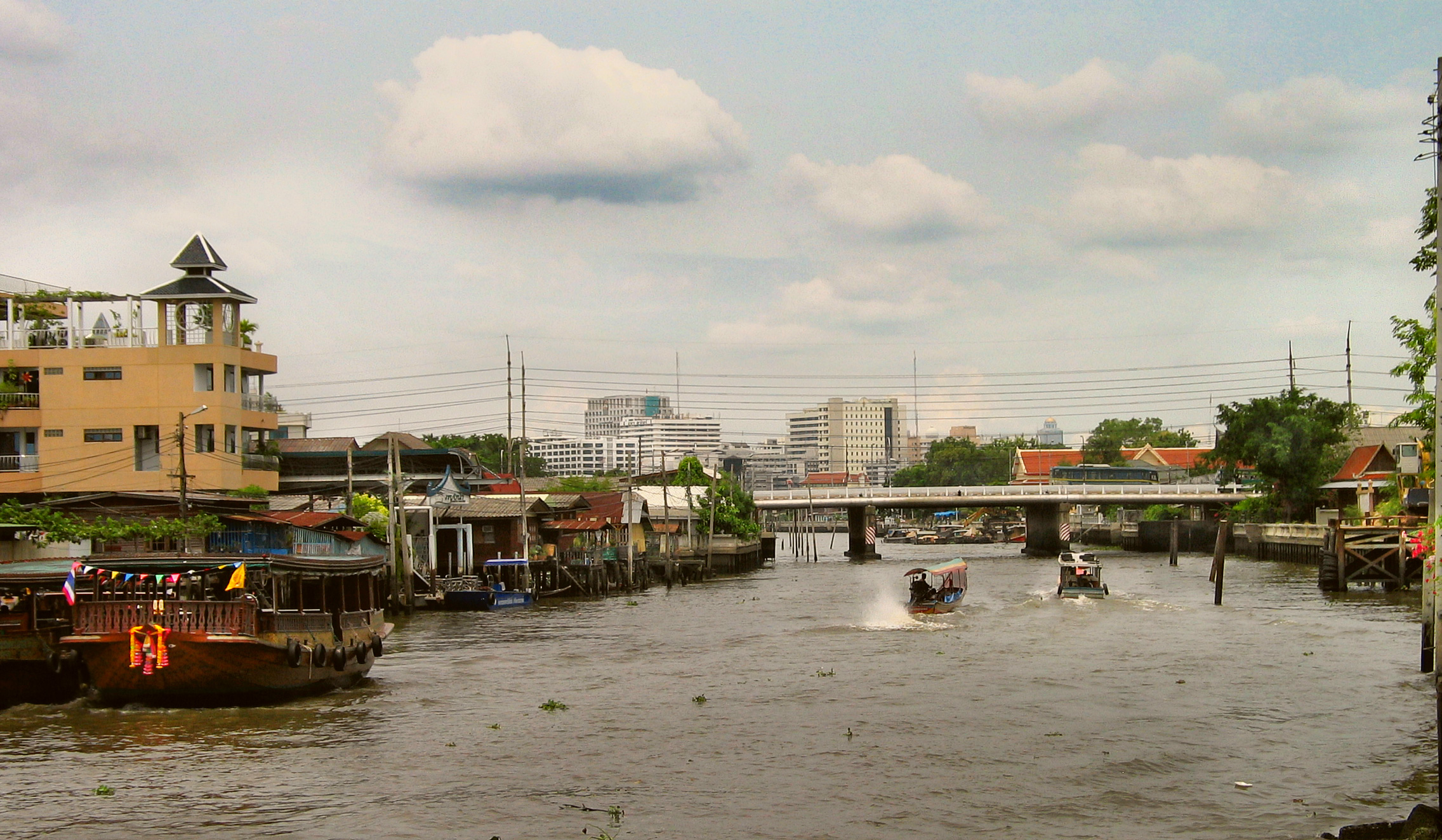
Khlong Bangkok Noi near Wat Si Sudaram

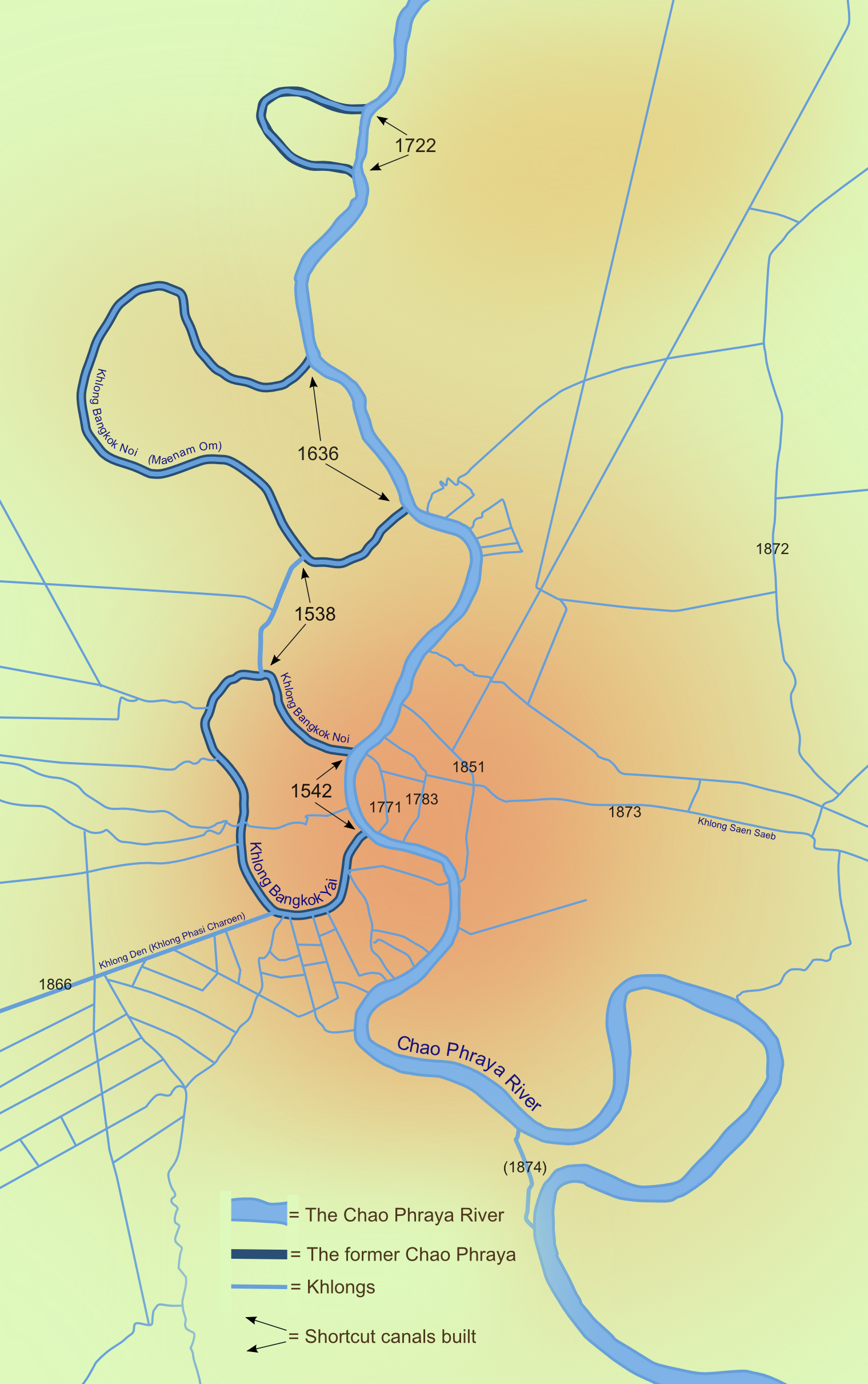
A map showing Chao Praya river's original course and its shortcut canals

Khlong Bangkok Noi (Thai: คลองบางกอกน้อย, pronounced [kʰlɔ̄ːŋ bāːŋ.kɔ̀ːk nɔ́ːj], lit. 'Small Bangkok Canal') is a khlong (lit. 'canal') in Bangkok; its name is the origin of the name Bangkok Noi District.

== History ==
The canal, along with its counterpart Khlong Bangkok Yai, was initially a meandering part of the Chao Praya River's original course. In 1552, during the reign of King Chairachathirat of the Ayutthaya Kingdom, he ordered the construction of a canal bypassing the meander to shorten travel time, known as Khlong Lat Bangkok (คลองลัดบางกอก, lit. 'Bangkok Short-Cut Canal'). As time passed, the new canal was eroded and became gradually wider. Eventually, the river diverted through the new canal, and its old course became the two canals known today as Khlong Bangkok Yai and Khlong Bangkok Noi.

In the early-Rattanakosin period, there was a floating market where vendor's boats and wooden houseboats mingled, lining up along the course to Bang Bamru and Bang Khun Non. This scenery was recounted in at least two poems by Sunthorn Phu (1786–1855), a poet of that era, who was born in Bangkok Noi.

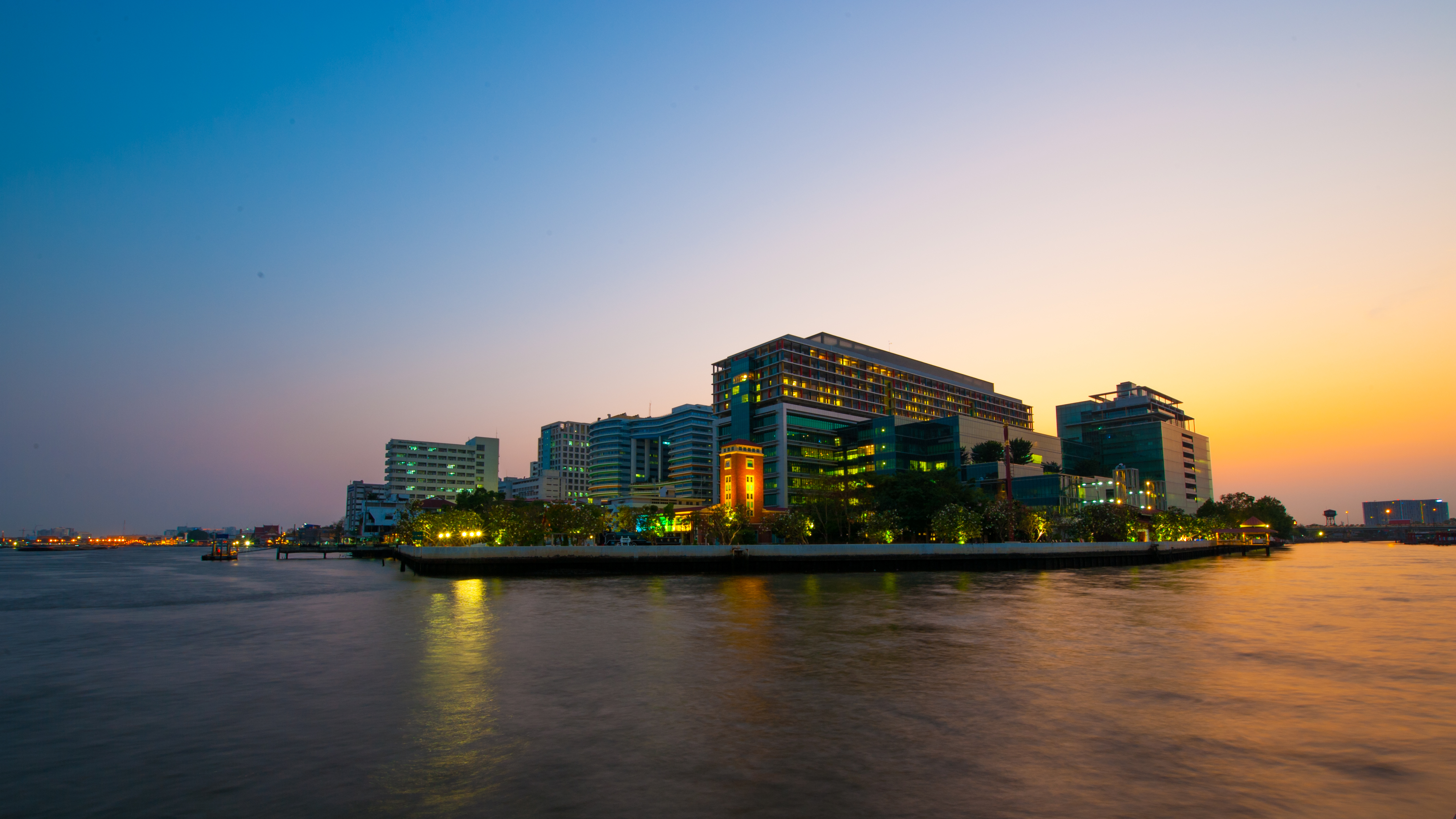
The mouth of Khlong Bangkok Noi lies beside Siriraj Piyamaharajkarun Hospital (SiPH)

== The course ==
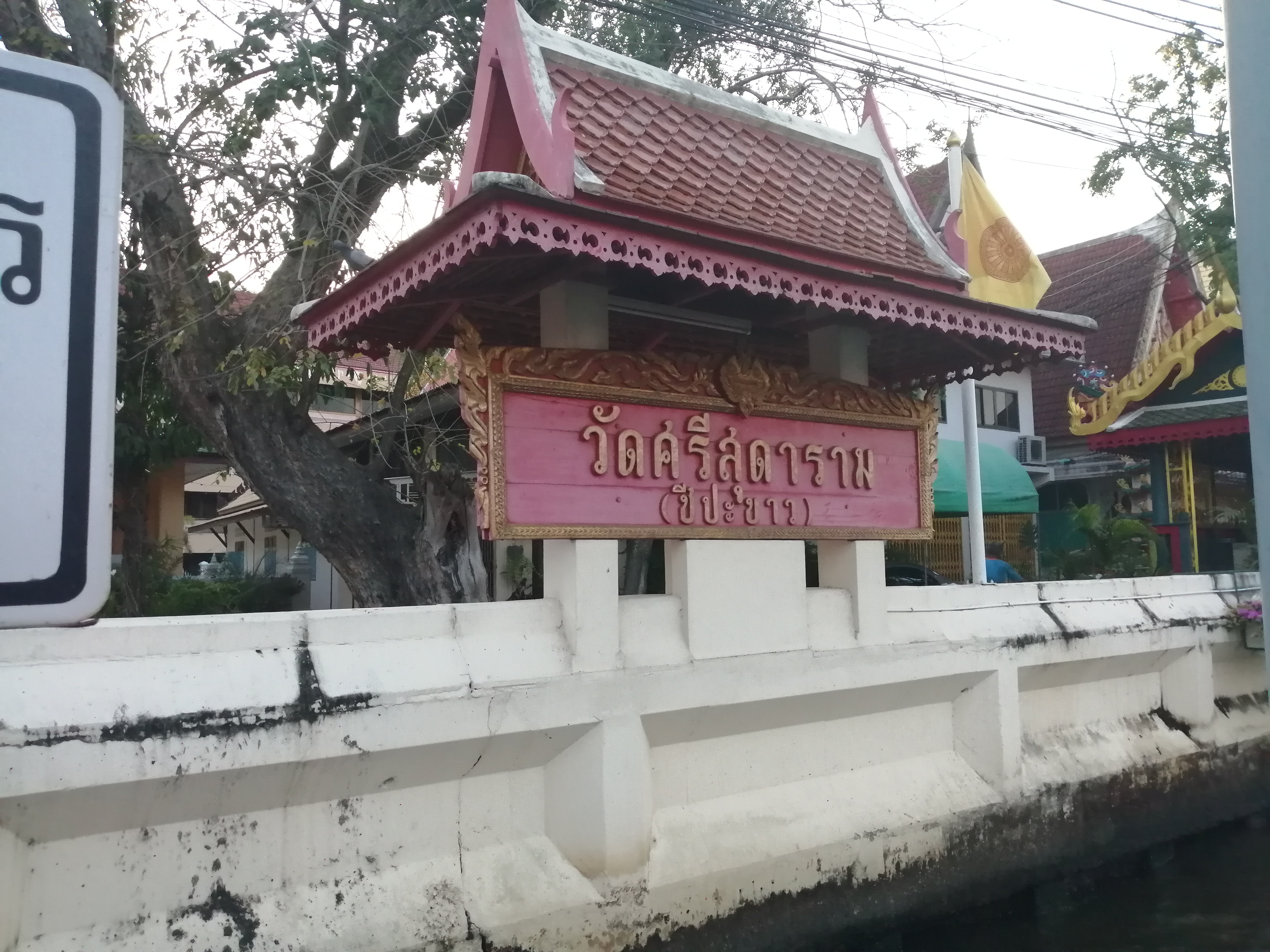
Sign of Wat Si Sudaram on the shore of Khlong Bangkok Noi

The mouth of Khlong Bangkok Noi is located beside Siriraj Piyamaharajkarun Hospital (SiPH) and the former Bangkok Noi railway station, now the site of Thonburi Railway Station Pier. The canal flows north past numerous historical and cultural landmarks, including Ansorissunnah Royal Mosque, the National Museum of Royal Barges, Wat Suwannaram, Thon Buri railway station, Wat Amarintharam, and Wat Si Sudaram, a Thai temple where Sunthorn Phu studied in his childhood, as well as Wat Bang Oi Chang in Nonthaburi Province. Along its course, the canal also connects to many other waterways, such as Khlong Chak Phra, Khlong Maha Sawat, and Khlong Bang Kruai, before terminating at the confluence with Khlong Om Non and Khlong Bang Yai near the Old Bang Yai Market in Bang Yai District, Nonthaburi Province.

For this reason, Khlong Bangkok Noi has been promoted as part of Bangkok’s cultural tourism routes, alongside other canals in the city and surrounding areas.
