= Wat Bang Oi Chang =

Buddhist temple in Nonthaburi, Thailand

Coordinates: 13°49′6.02″N 100°28′18.38″E

- วัดบางอ้อยช้าง
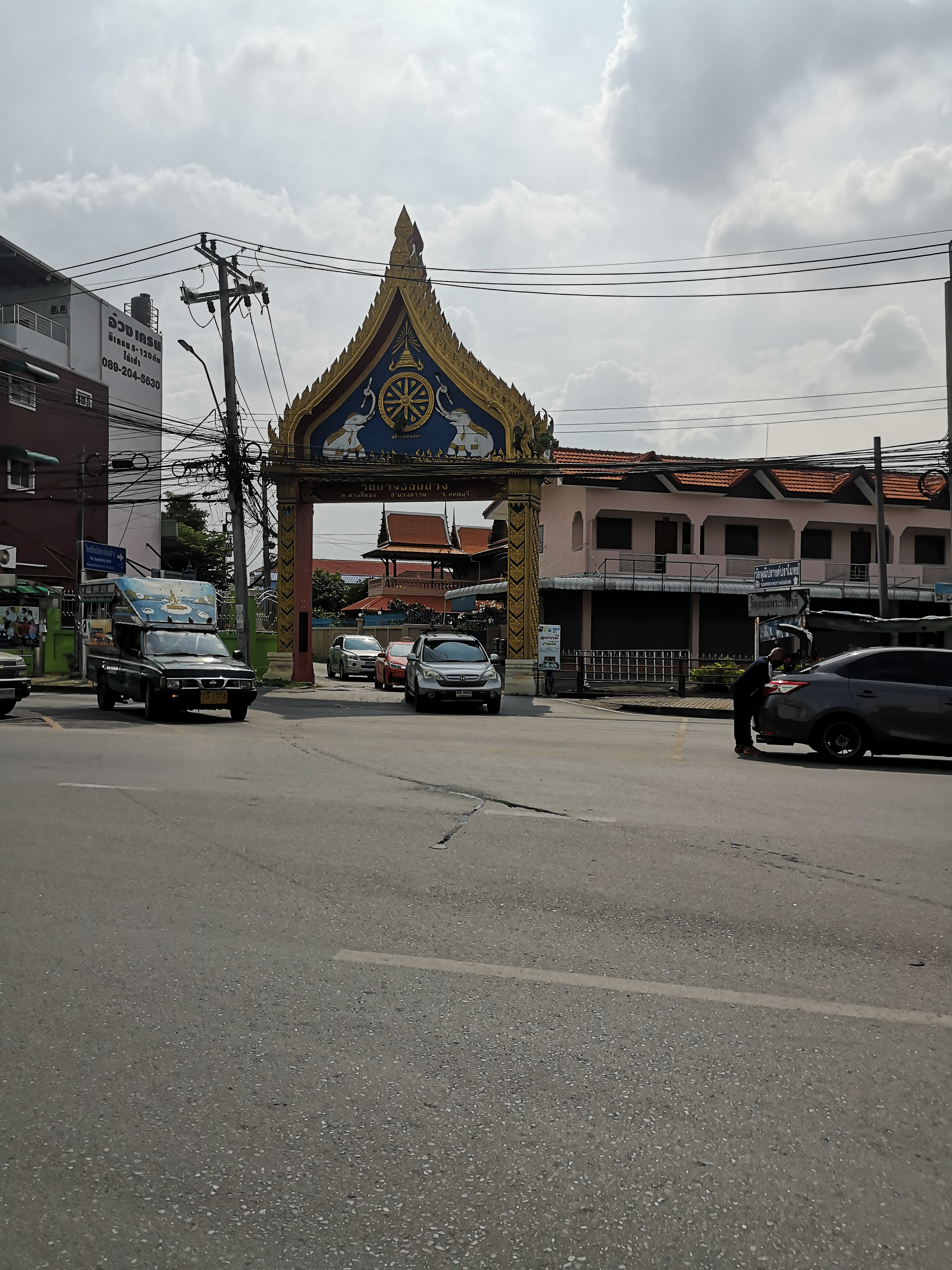
- The temple seen from Khlong Bangkok Noi

- Location within Thailand

Religion
- Affiliation: Buddhism
- Sect: Theravāda, Mahā Nikāya
- District: Bang Kruai
- Province: Nonthaburi
- Region: Central
- Status: Civilian temple

Location
- Location: 79 Mu 2, Soi Bang Kruai–Sai Noi 29, Bang Kruai–Sai Noi Rd, Bang Si Thong
- Country: Thailand
- Interactive map of Wat Bang Oi Chang

Architecture
- Type: Wat
- Style: Thai
- Founder: Bang Oi Chang people
- Completed: 1761

Wat Bang Oi Chang (Thai: วัดบางอ้อยช้าง, pronounced [wát bāːŋ ʔɔ̂j t͡ɕʰáːŋ]) is an ancient temple is located rim Khlong Bangkok Noi in the area of Bang Kruai District, Nonthaburi Province, on the outskirts of Bangkok.

Its name meaning "place of canes for elephants temple". Because its location are the communities whose duties used to supply elephant food, normally sugar-canes and other plants to the royal elephants during Ayutthaya period. In addition, it was a place where densely grown wodier trees (Oi Chang in Thai) sprouts, hence the name "Bang Oi Chang". At that time, people used the wodier tree bark for elephants. They pounded the bark until soft. The soft bark was then put over the backs of each battle elephant, beneath the howdah. It helped protect the elephant's skin from rubbing directly against the seat.

This temple is assumed to have been built in the late Ayutthaya period around 1761 by local people. During the war with Burma in the King Taksin's reign, the temple site was also used as a place to gather troops for war. Including a place for medical treatment for injured people as well as beasts of burden.

Wat Bang Oi Chang also mentioned in Nirat Phra Pathom (นิราศพระประธม, "journey to Phra Pathom Chedi"), a poem by famous poet Sunthon Phu in 1842. When he traveled to Nakhon Pathom Province to pay homage to Phra Pathom Chedi and passed to this temple by boat.

The inside of the temple is full of interesting things and many other precious relics, such as the hanging (raised as on hill) Buddha’s footprint cast in bronze more than 200 years ago, just one of this in the world, the temple museum exhibits a number of old items, including wooden cabinets for keeping Tripiṭaka scripture. Among them are cupboards that show foreign influences such as communities of Chinese people and Kāma (god of love and passion), with a portrait of King Chulalongkorn (Rama V) given to the temple when he made merit at the temple, according to the village head, including items used in the daily lives of people in the past, old coins, kitchenware, war weapons, a wooden boat etc.

In addition, the principal Sukhothai Buddha statue in Māravijaya posture named "Phra Si Satsada" (พระศรีศาสดา), it can be considered an important Buddha statue with a long legend and history alongside Phra Phuttha Chinnarat in Phitsanulok Province and Phra Phuttha Chinnasi of Wat Bowonniwet in Bangkok. It once was almost sent to enshrine at Wat Pradu Chimphli in Bangkok's Thonburi side, but was rejected by King Mongkut (Rama IV) because it was an important Buddha statue.
