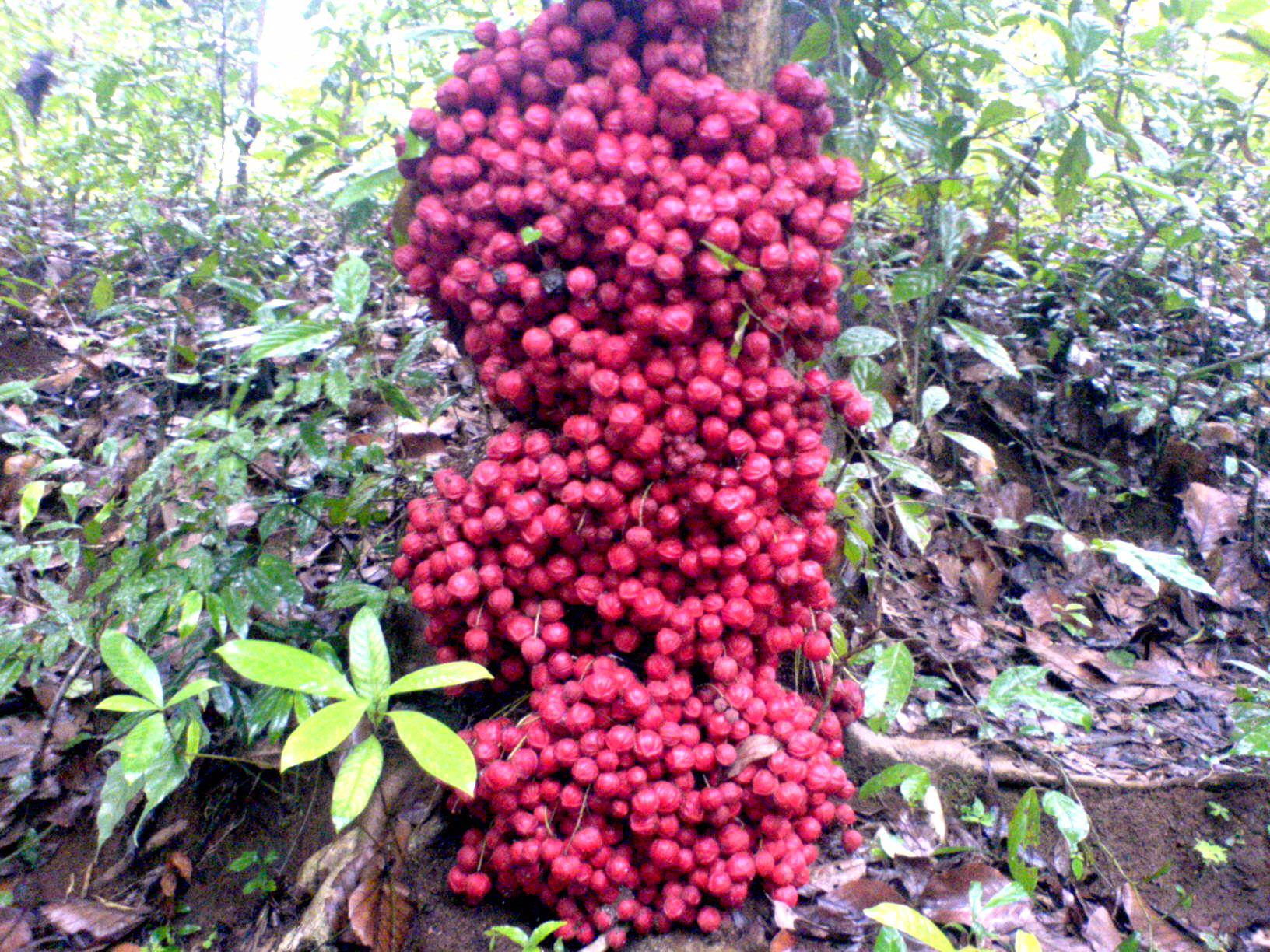

Scientific classification
- Kingdom: Plantae
- Clade: Tracheophytes
- Clade: Angiosperms
- Clade: Eudicots
- Clade: Rosids
- Order: Malpighiales
- Family: Phyllanthaceae
- Genus: Baccaurea
- Species: B. courtallensis

Binomial name
- Baccaurea courtallensis (Wight) Müll.Arg.

Synonyms
- Baccaurea macrostachya (Wight & Arn.) Hook.f.; Pierardia courtallensis Wight; Pierardia macrostachya Wight & Arn.

= Baccaurea courtallensis =

Species of flowering plant from the Western Ghats, in India

Baccaurea courtallensis is a species of flowering plant belonging to the family Phyllanthaceae. It is endemic to the Western Ghats mountains in India. It is a medium size evergreen understory tree frequent in tropical wet evergreen forests of the low and mid-elevations (40-1000m). It is a Near Threatened species according to the IUCN Red List of Threatened Species.

== Description ==
It is a medium size tree up to 10-18m tall and girth up to 1.3 m. Bark is grey and generally smooth or scaly. The leaves are simple, alternate and clustered at twig end. The leaf petiole is 1.2 to 3.8 cm long and swollen at both ends.

The flowers are scarlet in colour and dioecious. Inflorescence are in long stalks arranged in clusters growing on the trunk of the tree i.e. cauliflorous. Male inflorescence is clustered all over the trunk. Female inflorescence is clustered mostly at the base of the trunk. The fruit are globose, crimson coloured and ribbed. Fruits are sour to sweet in taste when fully ripe. Pollen size 10 to 12 μM.

== Common names ==
Malayalam: Mootilpazham, Mootilthoori, Mootippuli, Mootikaya

Kannada: Kolikukke, Kodikukke, Kolakukki

Tamil: Kuran Pazam Pulichampazham, Mootupazham (மூட்டுப்பழம்)

== Distribution and habitat ==
This tree is endemic to the Western Ghats. It grows in the tropical evergreen forests and occasionally grows along river or stream banks in the moist deciduous forests of southern India.

== Ecology ==
Flowering: Aug, Nov, Dec., February to March/ May in southern Western Ghats. Leaf buds and fruits are eaten by Nilgiri Langurs, Elephants and Lion-tailed Macaques were also known to feed on the ripe fruits.

== Uses ==
The fruit is edible and eaten by people

== Gallery ==
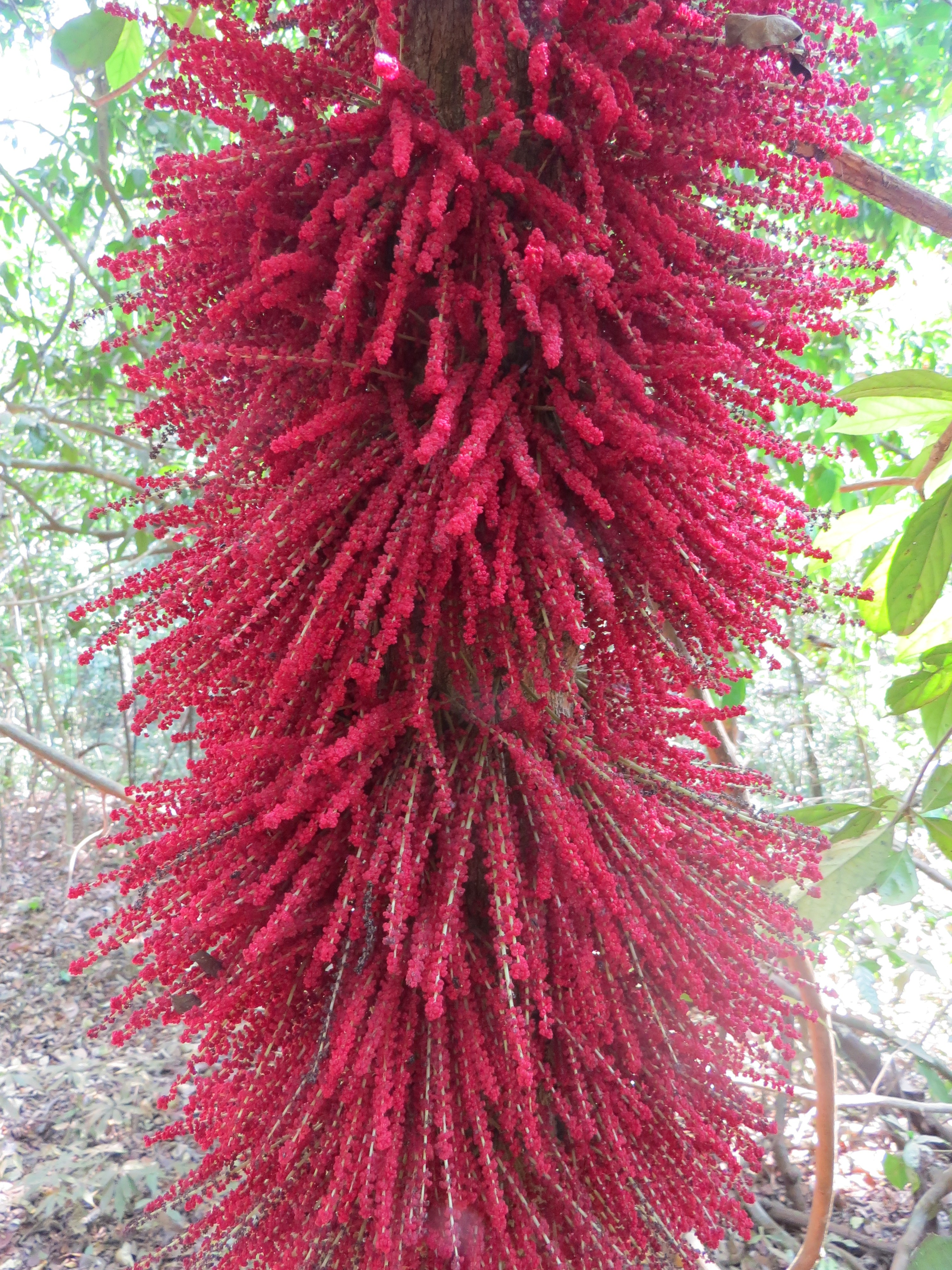
Baccaurea courtallensis flowers

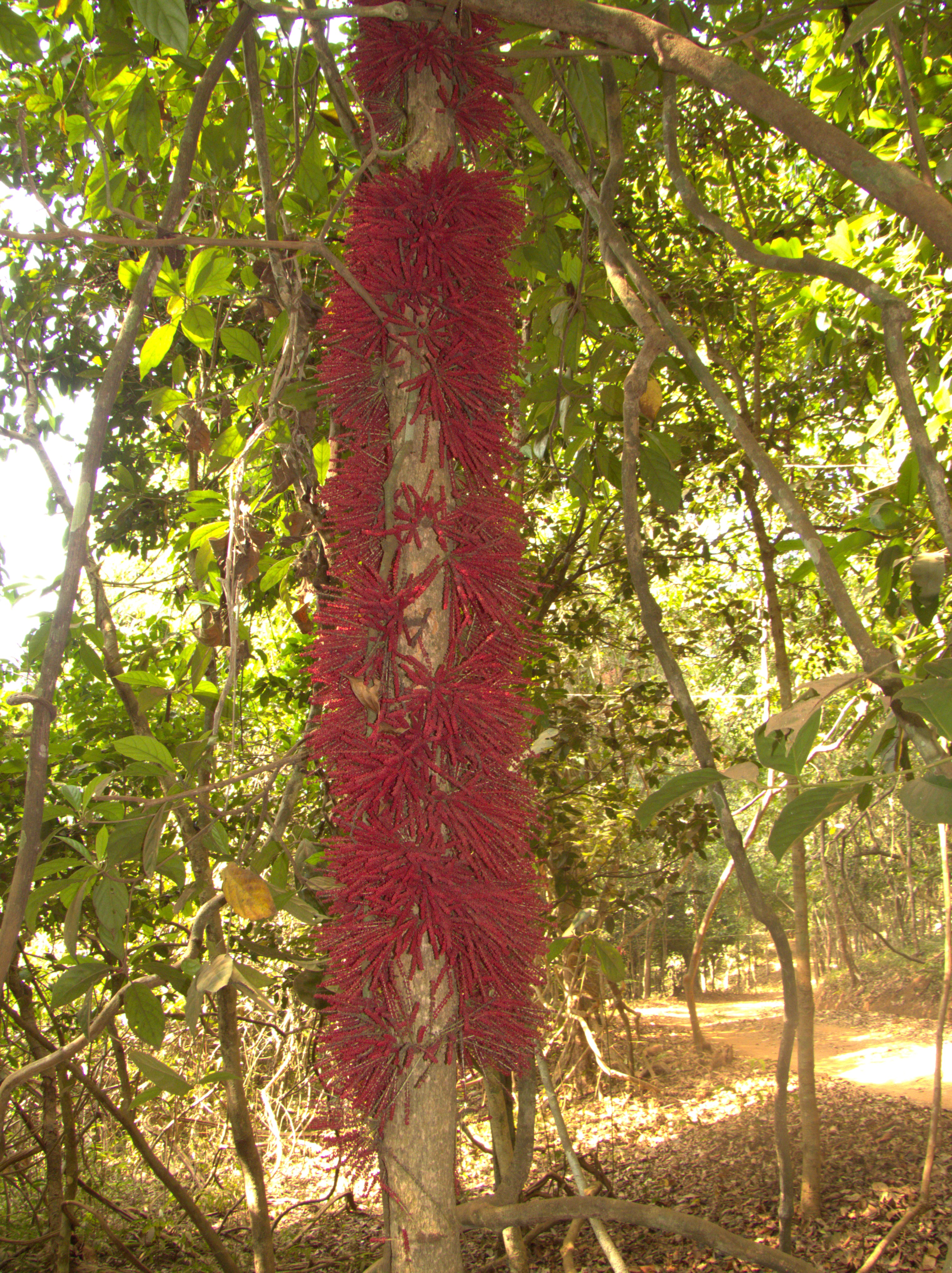
Baccaurea courtallensis flowers

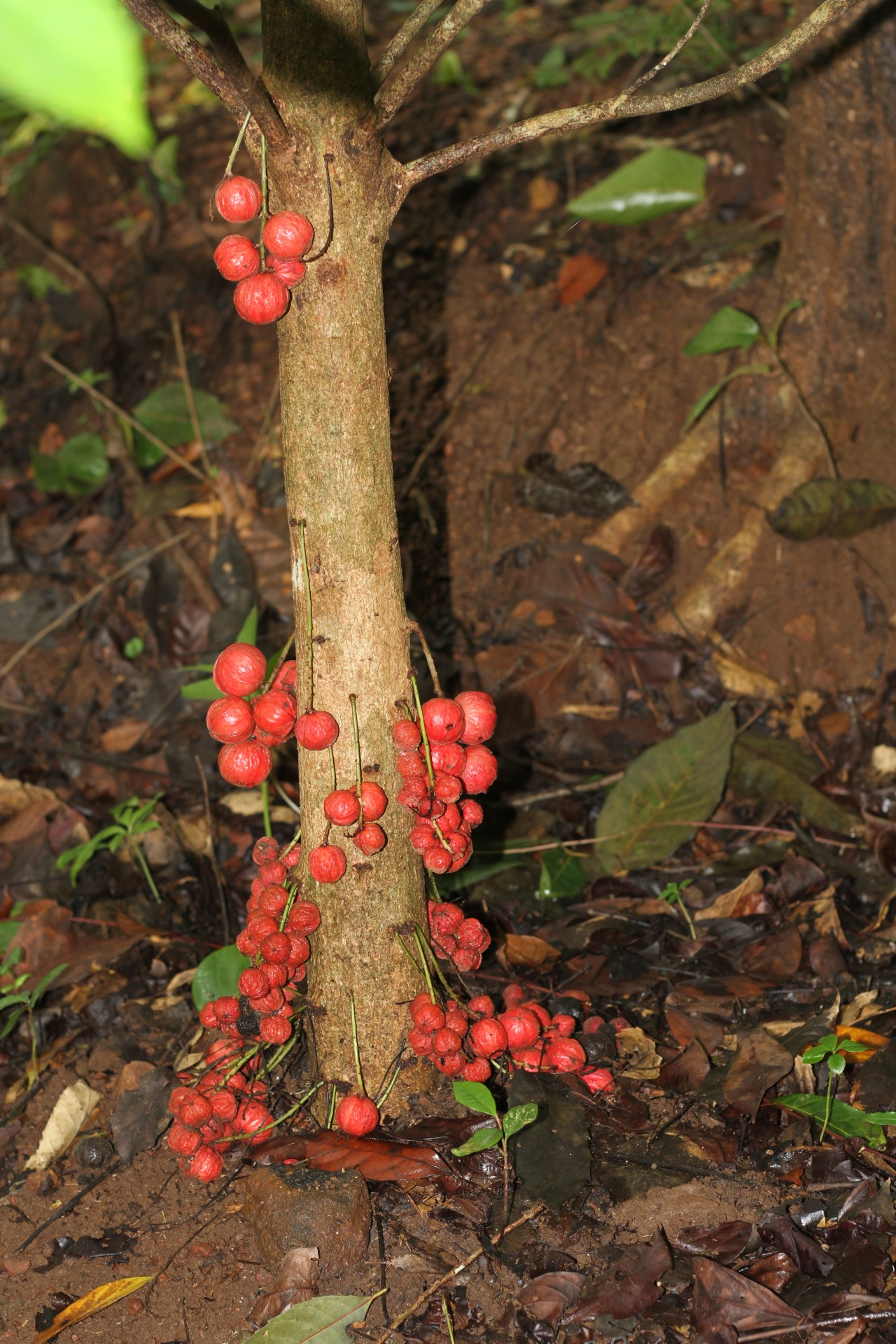
Baccaurea courtallensis fruits

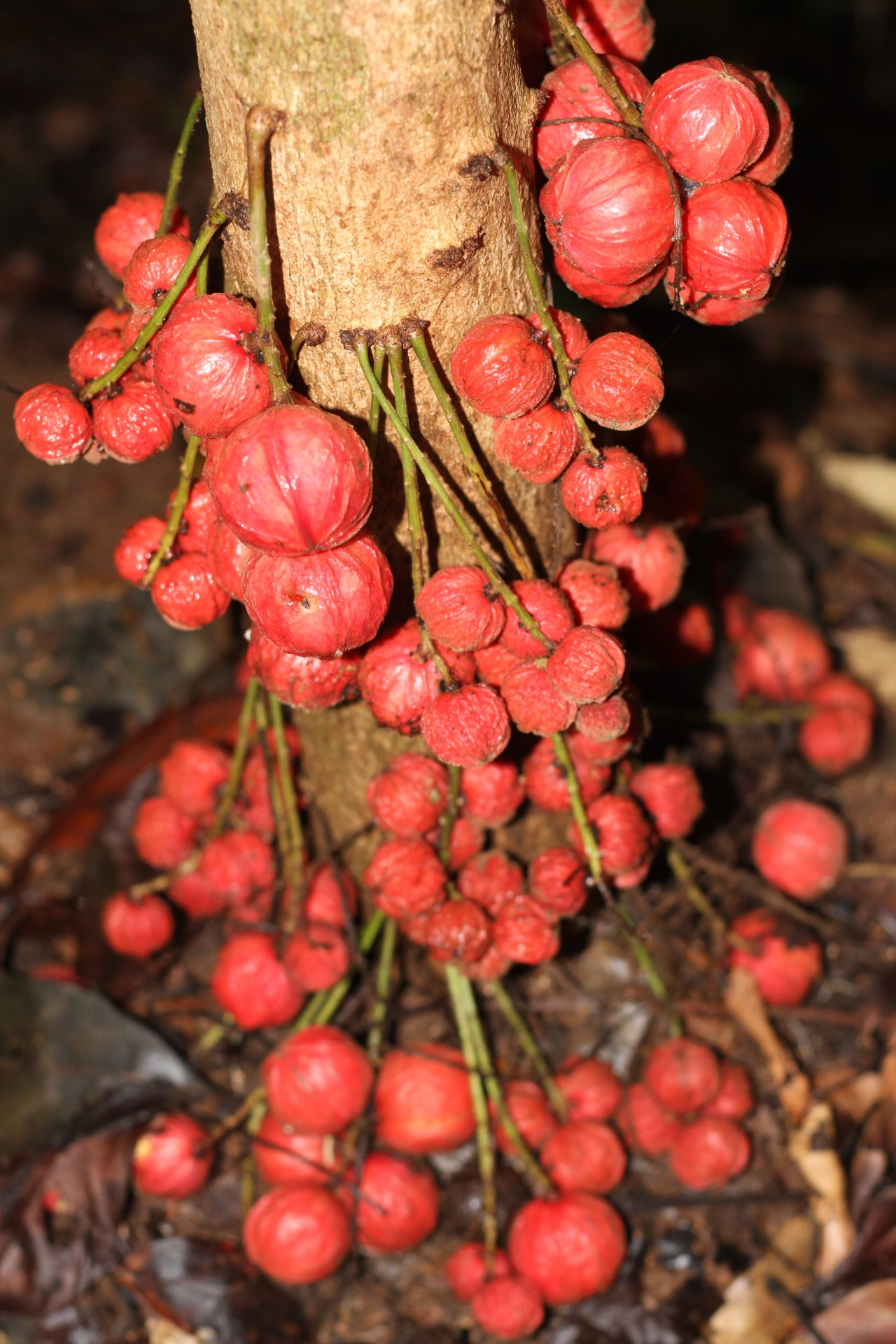
Baccaurea courtallensis fruits

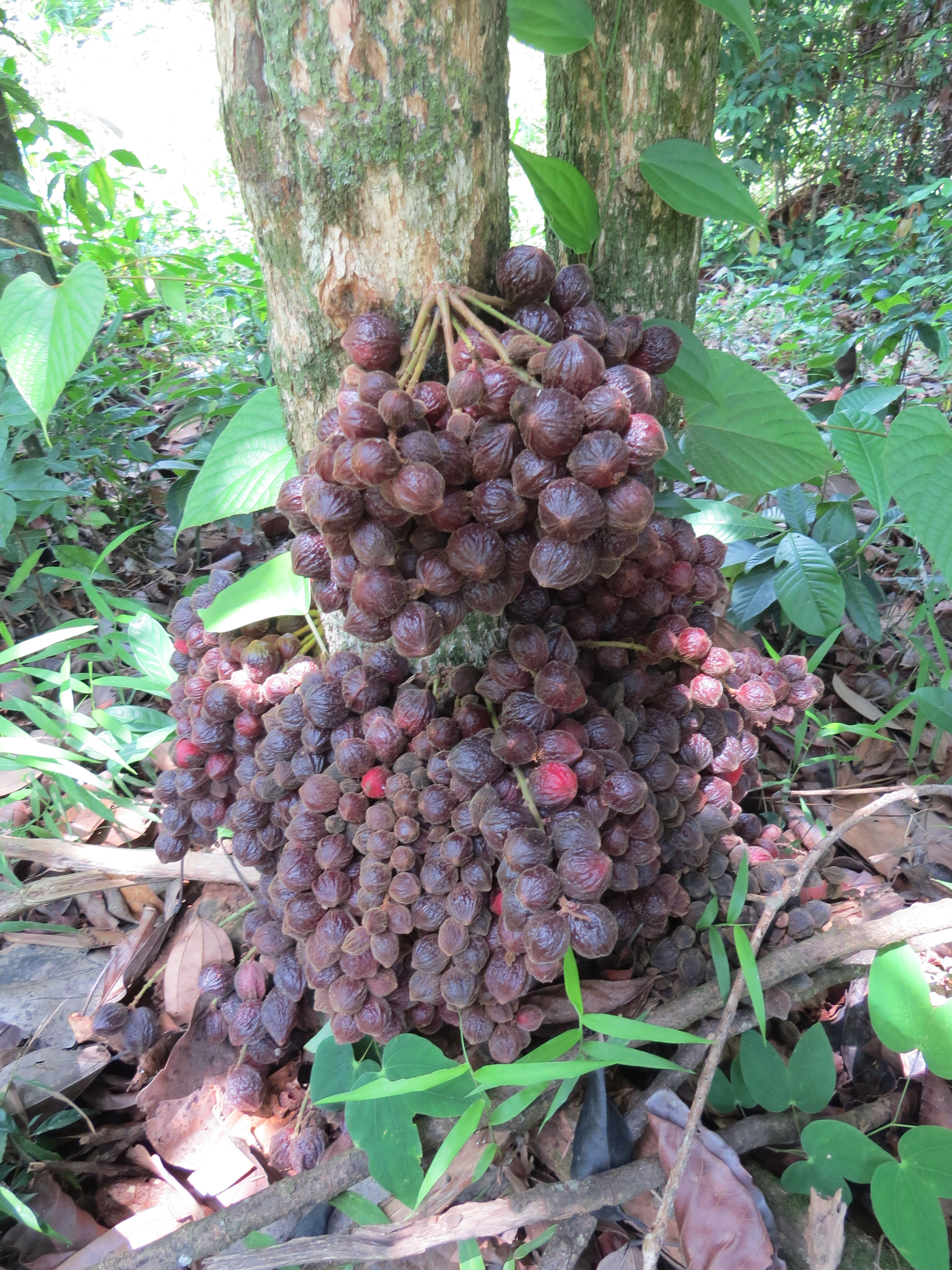
Baccaurea courtallensis fruits

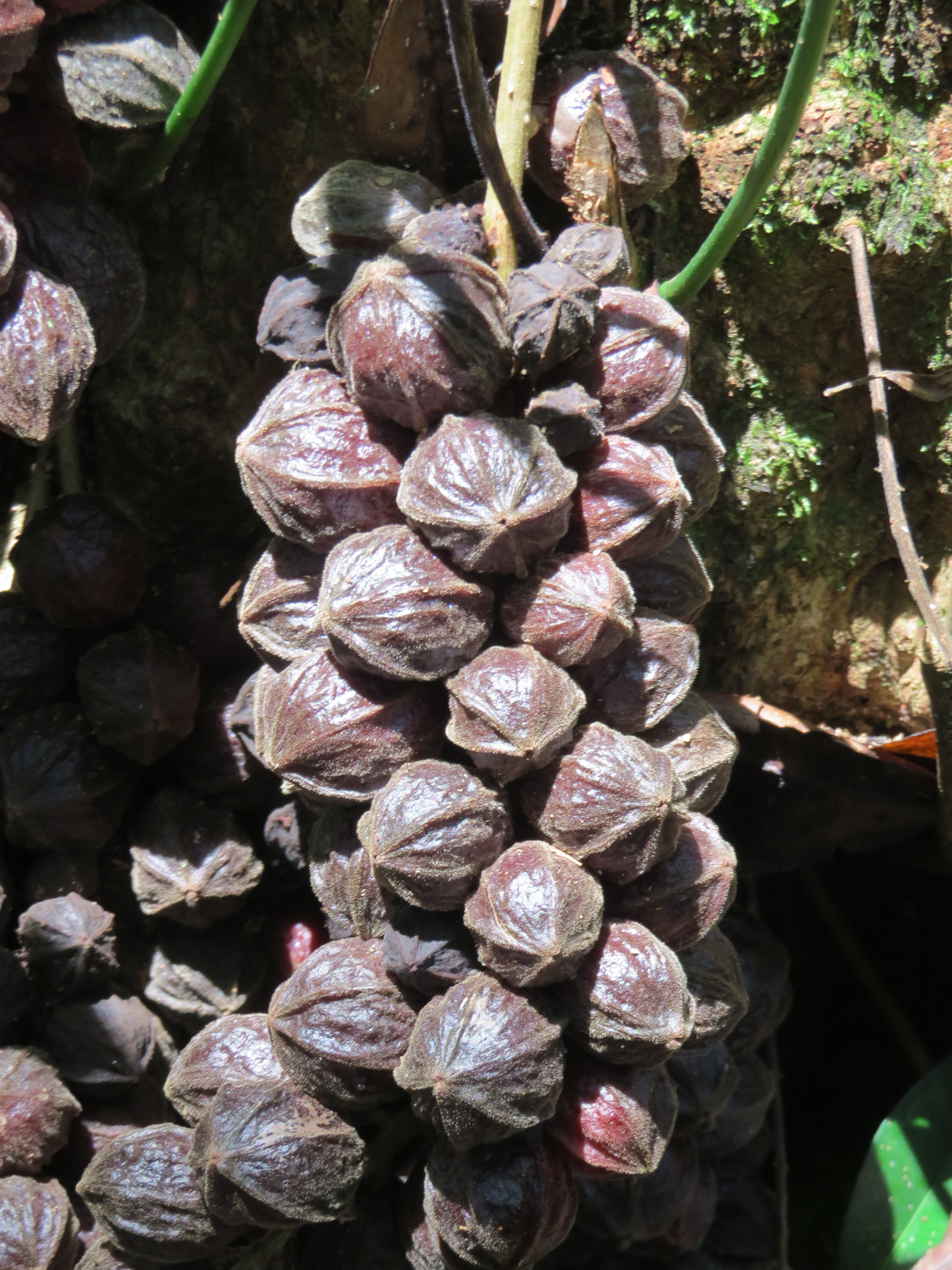
Baccaurea courtallensis fruits
