= Wat Si Sudaram =

Buddhist temple in Thailand

- Wat Chi Pa Kaow
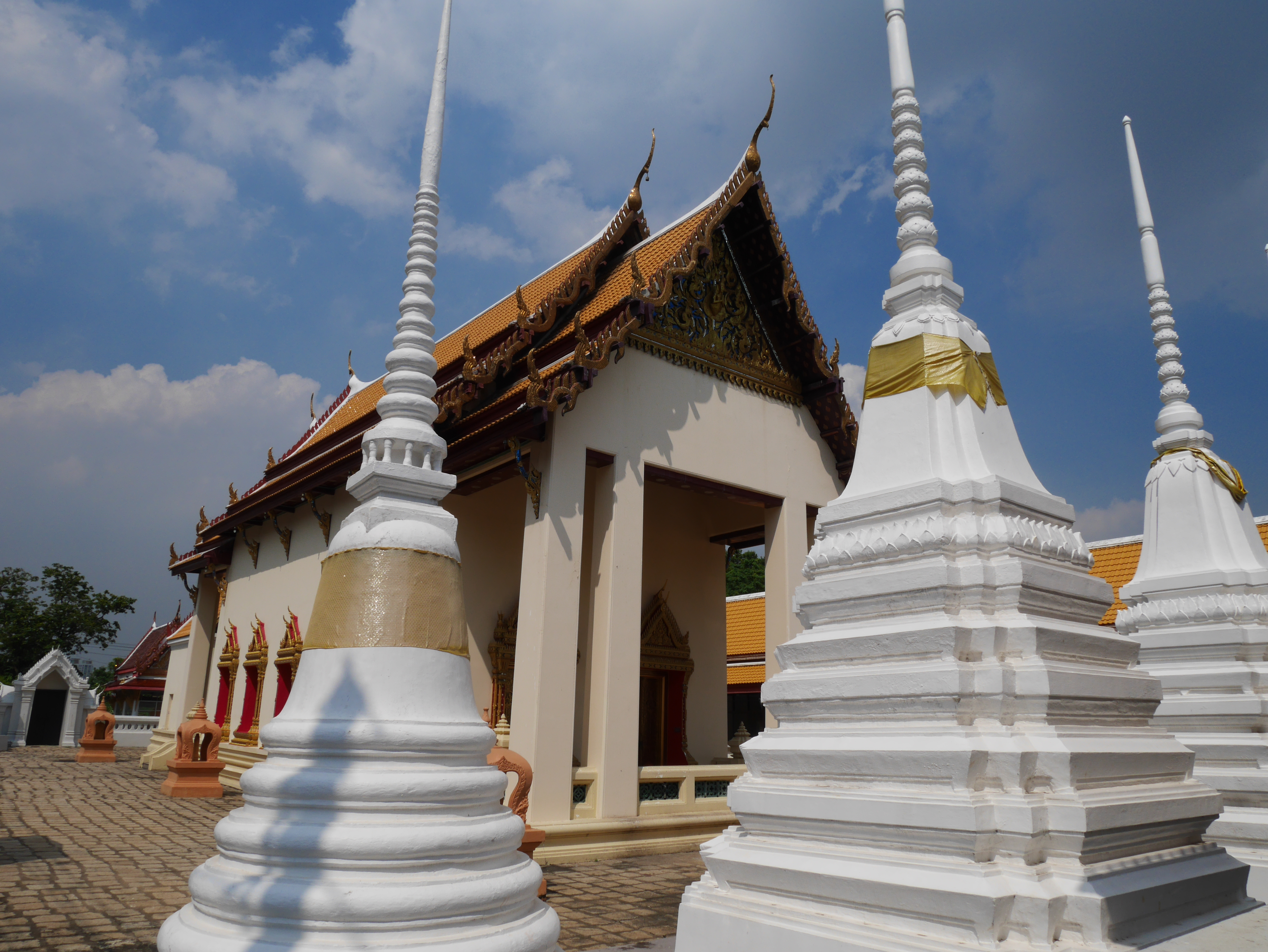
- The ubosot (main hall)

- Location within Bangkok

Religion
- Affiliation: Buddhism
- Sect: Theravāda Mahā Nikāya
- Status: Third-class royal temple

Location
- Location: 83 Soi Bang Khun Non 6, Bang Khun Non Rd, Bang Khun Non, Bangkok Noi, Bangkok 10700
- Country: Thailand
- Interactive map of Wat Si Sudaram
- Coordinates: 13.7672°N 100.4731°E

Wat Si Sudaram Worawihan popularly called for short Wat Si Sudaram (Thai: วัดศรีสุดารามวรวิหาร, วัดศรีสุดาราม) is a historic Buddhist temple in Thailand. It is located on the canal Khlong Bangkok Noi in Bangkok's Bang Khun Non neighbourhood.

The temple originally called Wat Chi Pa Kaow (วัดชีปะขาว, lit: white-robed ascetic temple). It is interesting from a historical perspective, because it was the childhood schooling place of the famous poet Sunthorn Phu. His poetry has mentioned this temple also for others ancient bard such as Prince Wongsa Dhiraj Snid and Luang Chak Phranee (Maha Rerk) which was also mentioned this temple.

Wat Si Sudram is the third-class of the royal temple, assumed that was built during the King Narai's reign of Ayutthaya period. Later in Rattanakosin period, Princess Si Sudarak (Kaew), the King Rama I's sister renovated this temple.

Wat Si Sudram is measured with beautiful of art and interesting architecture, there is also a huge bronze statue of the instructor monk Somdej Toh, which is respectful for Thai people.

== Gallery ==
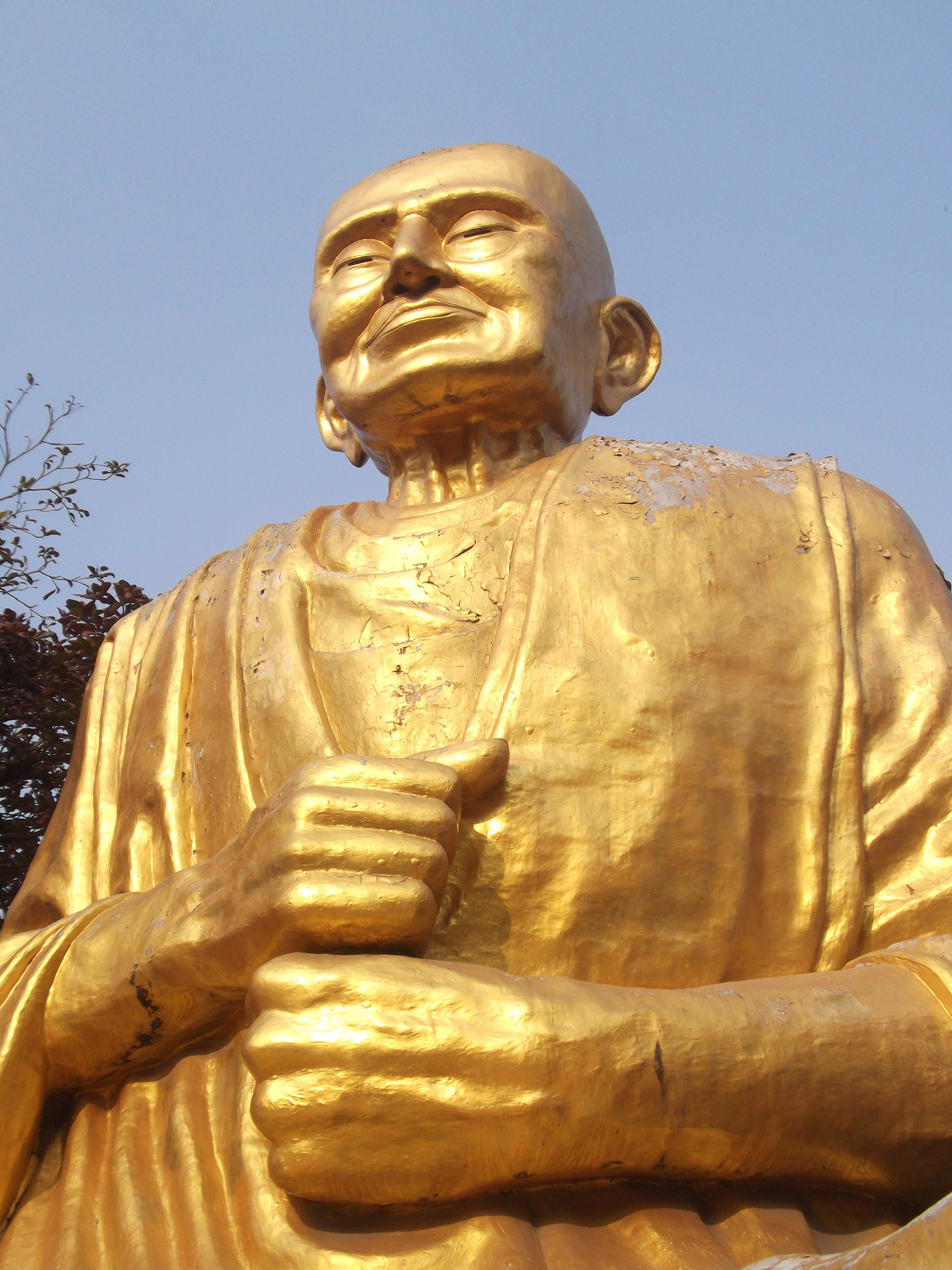
Statue of Somdej Toh

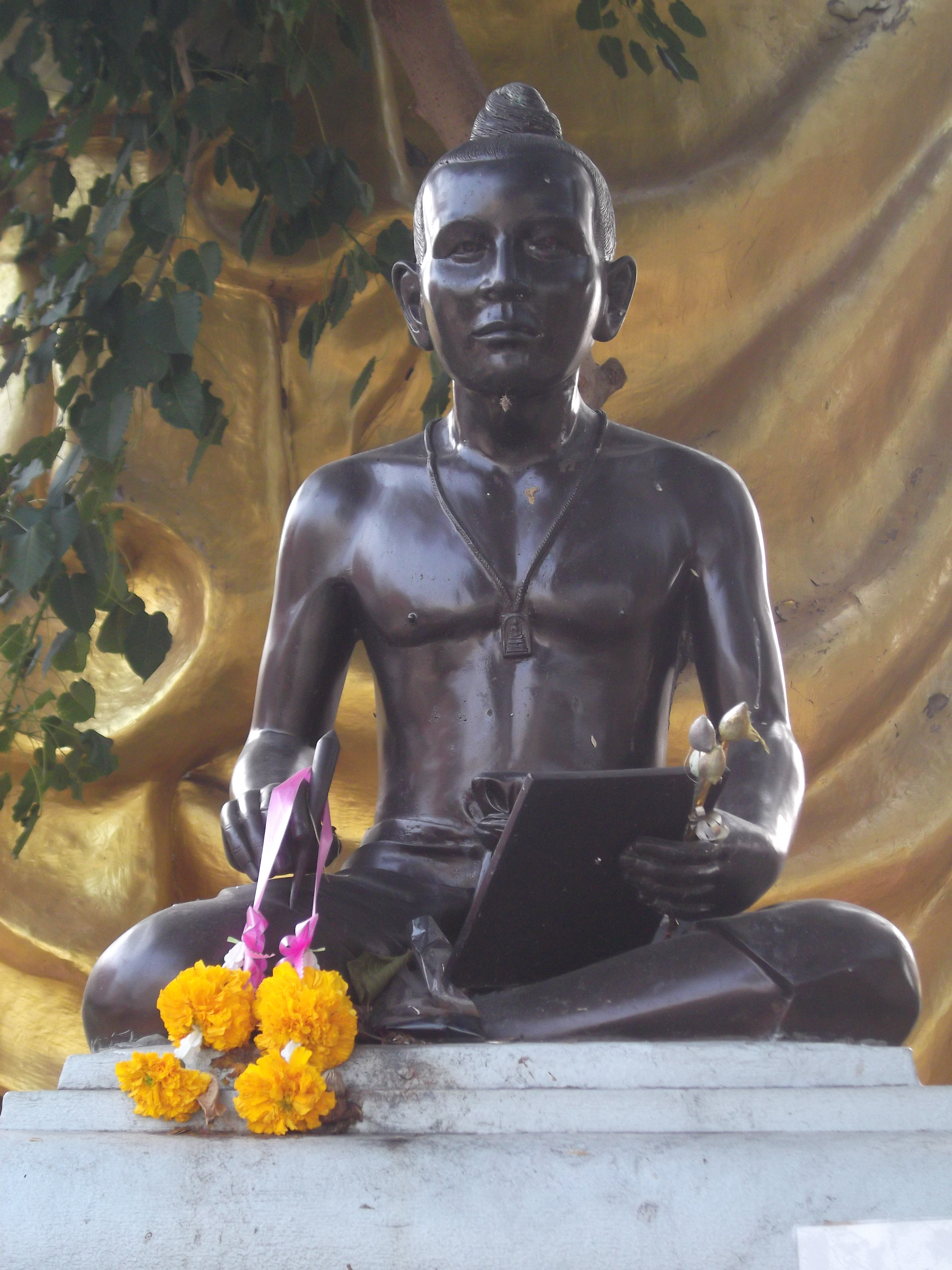
Sunthorn Phu childhood monument

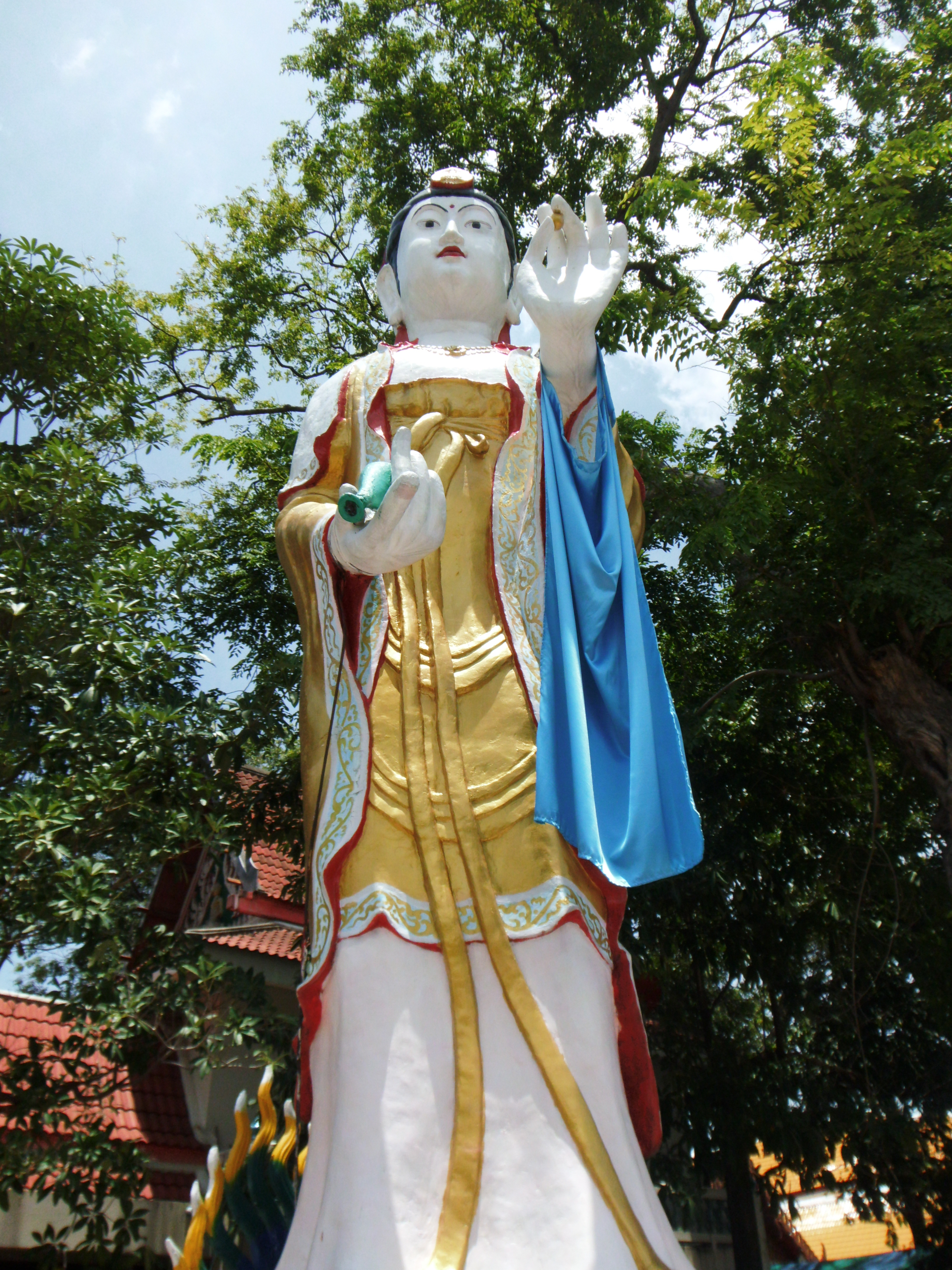
Statue of Chinese goddess Guanyin along Khlong Bangkok Noi

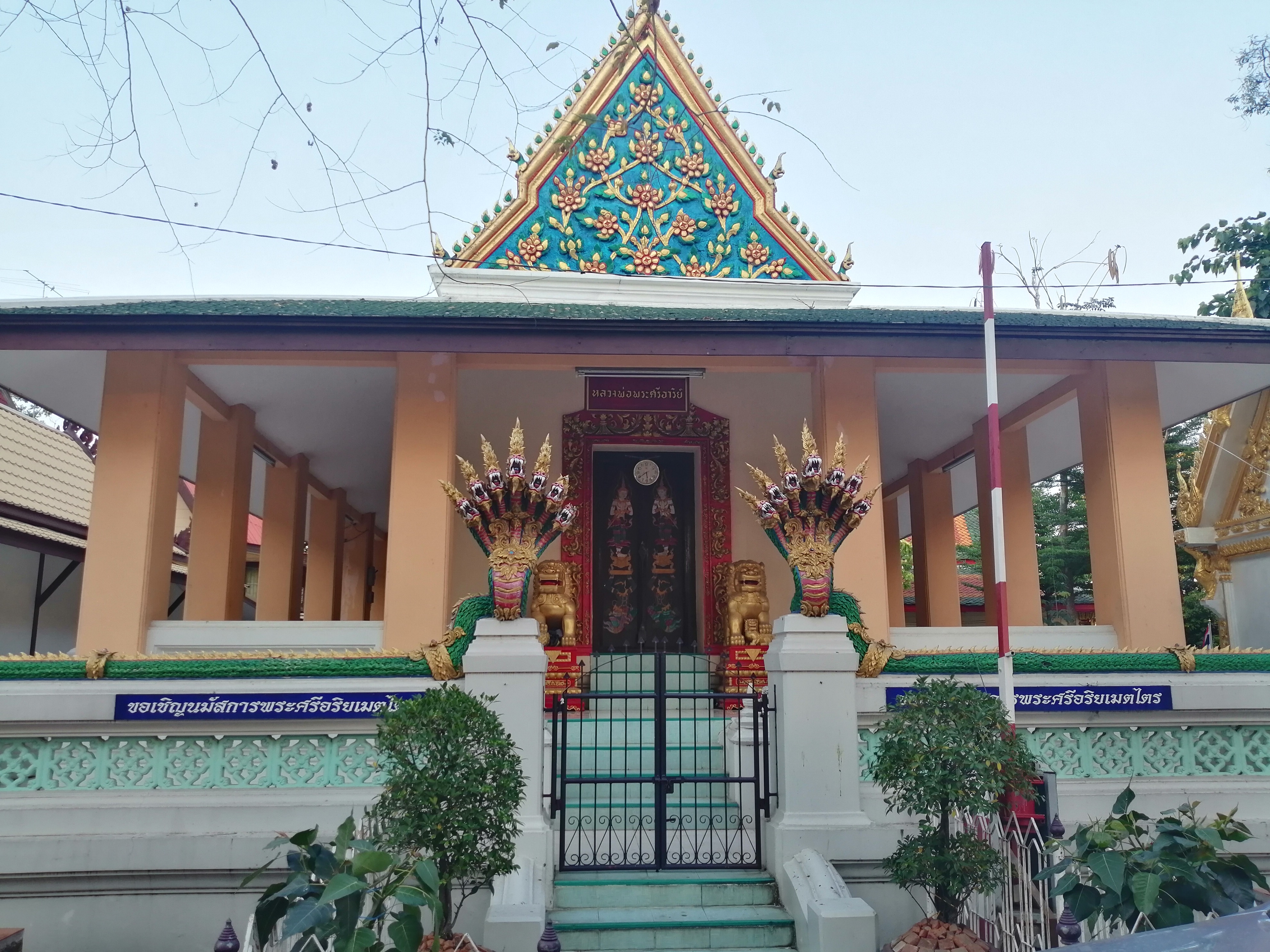
Ho trai (Tipiṭaka library)
