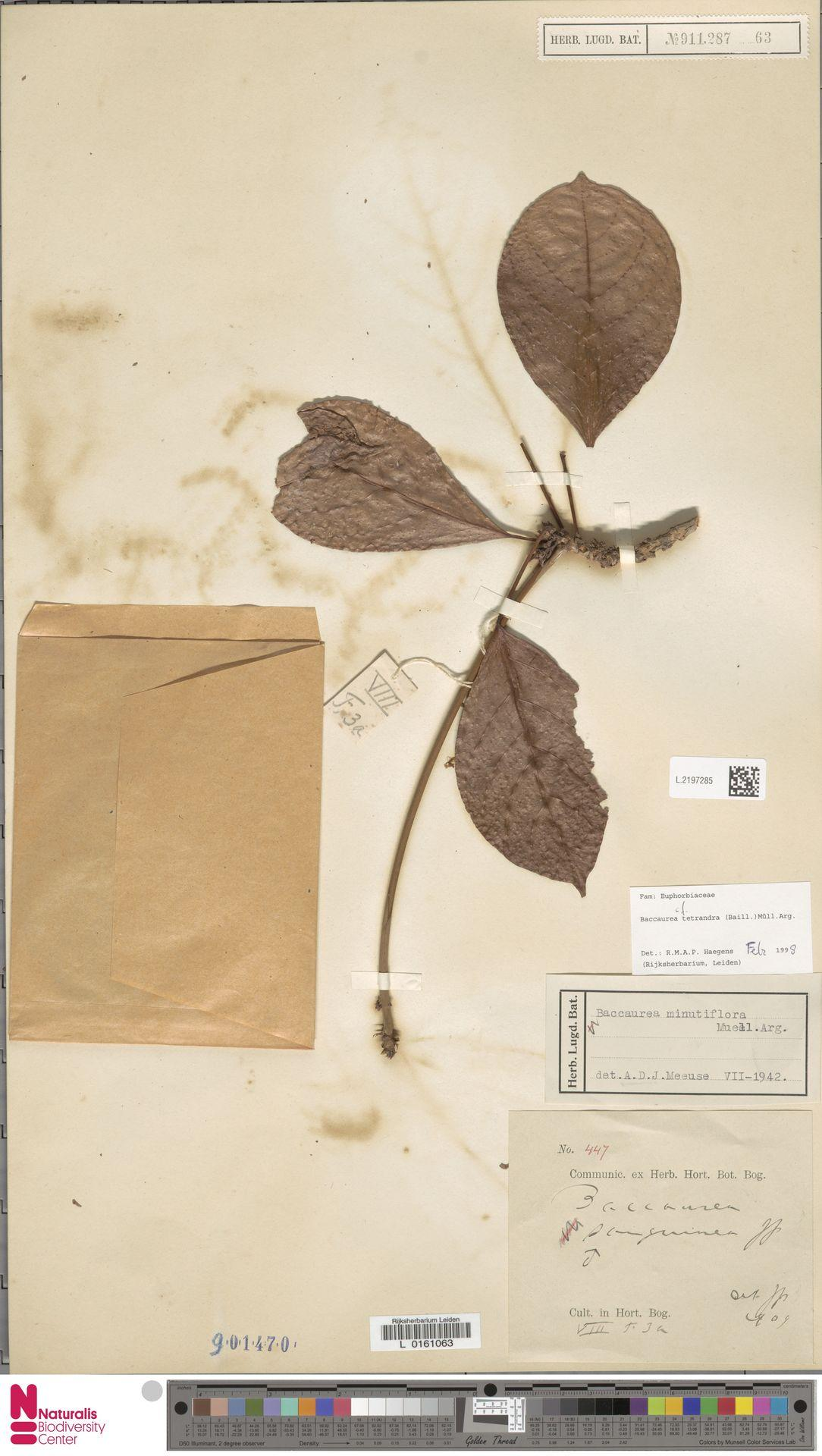
- Herbarium specimen

Scientific classification
- Kingdom: Plantae
- Clade: Tracheophytes
- Clade: Angiosperms
- Clade: Eudicots
- Clade: Rosids
- Order: Malpighiales
- Family: Phyllanthaceae
- Genus: Baccaurea
- Species: B. tetrandra

Binomial name
- Baccaurea tetrandra (Baill.) Müll.Arg.

Synonyms
- Adenocrepis tetrandra Baill.; Baccaurea brevipedicellata Pax & K.Hoffm.; Baccaurea stipulata J.J.Sm.; Baccaurea terminaliifolia Elmer

= Baccaurea tetrandra =

Species of flowering plant

Baccaurea tetrandra, also known as mata kunau in Malay and more locally as kunau-kunau or enkuni, is a species of flowering plant, a tropical forest fruit-tree in the tampoi family, that is native to Southeast Asia.

== Description ==
The species grows as a dioecious tree to 4–20 m in height, with a short, occasionally fluted, 1–1.5 m bole. The smooth, oval leaves are 5–21 cm long by 2–12 cm wide. The inflorescences of white or green to yellow (sometimes red) flowers occur in the leaf axils and along the branches. The fruits are pink to red berries, with the seeds contained in an edible, blue to purple arillode.

== Distribution and habitat ==
The species is found in Borneo, the Philippines, Sulawesi and the Maluku Islands, where it occurs in lowland and hill mixed dipterocarp, swamp and secondary forests, up to an elevation of 1,500 m. It is sometimes cultivated in villages.
