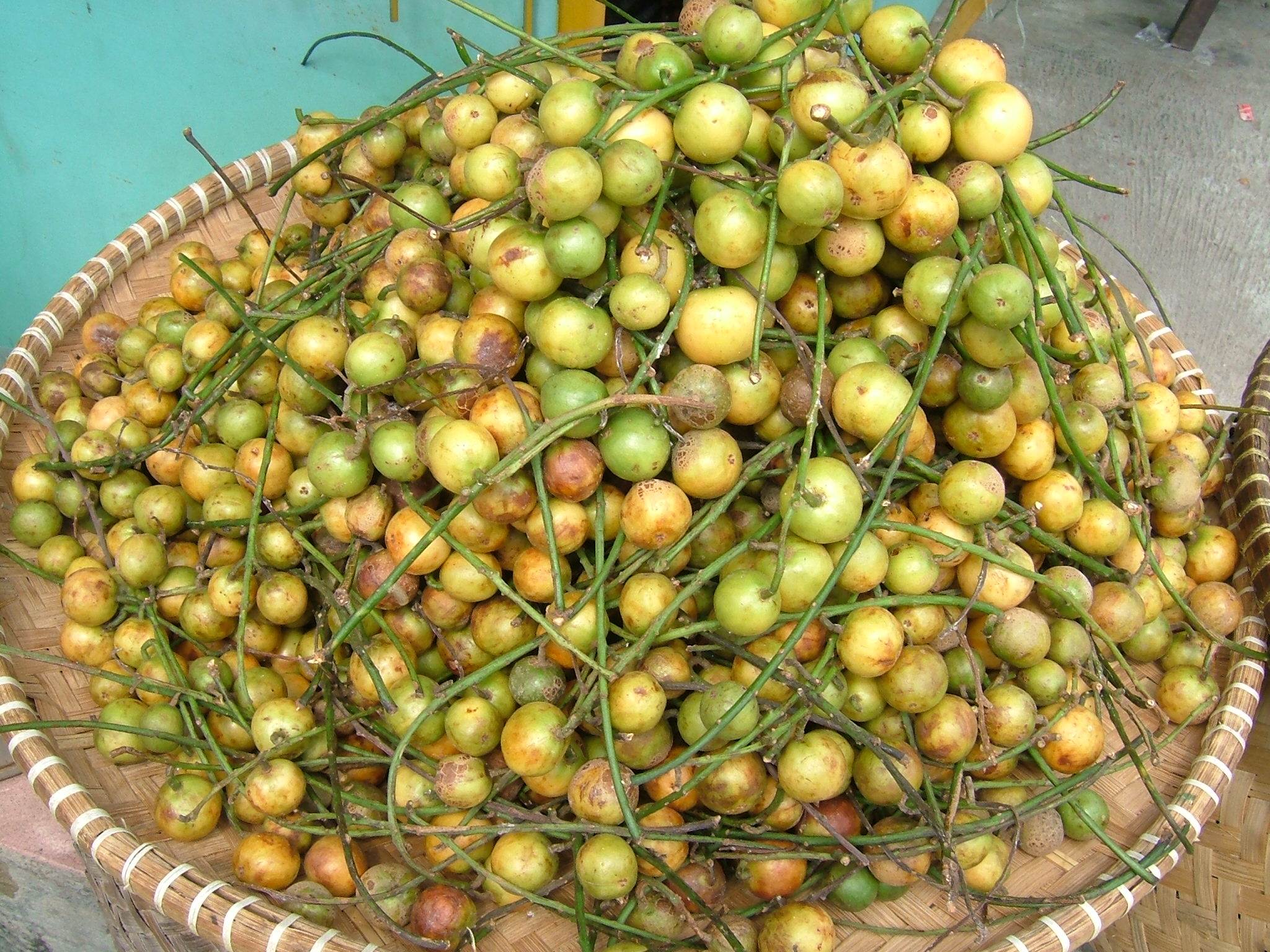

Scientific classification
- Kingdom: Plantae
- Clade: Tracheophytes
- Clade: Angiosperms
- Clade: Eudicots
- Clade: Rosids
- Order: Malpighiales
- Family: Phyllanthaceae
- Genus: Baccaurea
- Species: B. racemosa

Binomial name
- Baccaurea racemosa (Reinw. ex Blume) Müll.Arg., 1866

= Baccaurea racemosa =

Plant species

Baccaurea racemosa (common names: kapundung or menteng) is a species of fruit tree in Southeast Asia. It belongs to the family Phyllanthaceae.

The name of the elite suburb of Menteng in central Jakarta comes from this tree.
