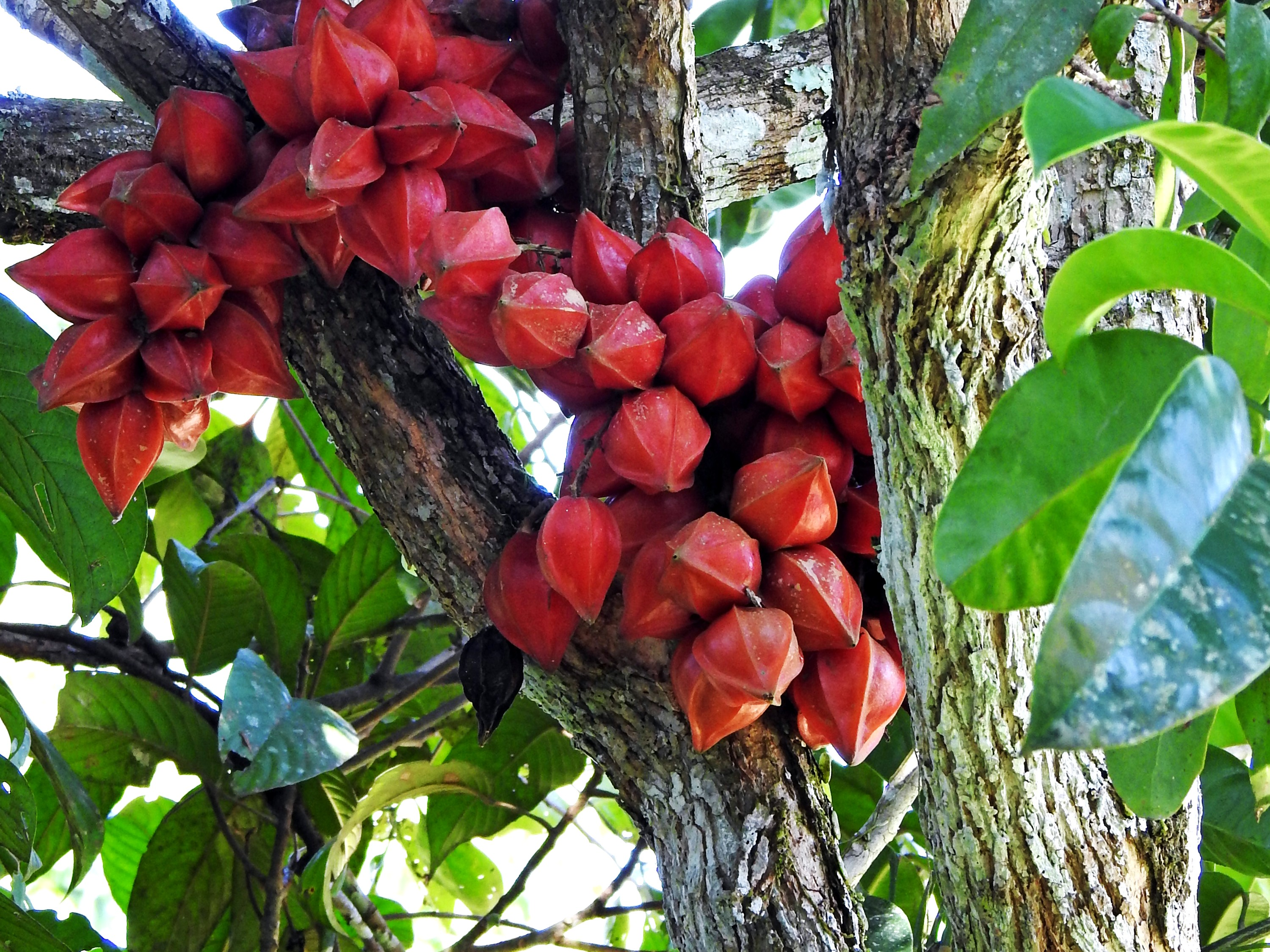
- Fruits

Scientific classification
- Kingdom: Plantae
- Clade: Tracheophytes
- Clade: Angiosperms
- Clade: Eudicots
- Clade: Rosids
- Order: Malpighiales
- Family: Phyllanthaceae
- Genus: Baccaurea
- Species: B. angulata

Binomial name
- Baccaurea angulata Merr.

= Baccaurea angulata =

Species of flowering plant

Baccaurea angulata, also known as belimbing hutan or belimbing darah in Malay and more locally as ucong or embaling, is a species of flowering plant, a fruit tree in the tampoi family, that is native to Southeast Asia, especially Indonesia.

== Description ==
The species grows as a dioecious tree to 6–21 m in height, with a 2–5 m bole. The smooth, oval leaves are 12–30 cm long by 4–14 cm wide. The inflorescences of cream to yellow flowers are clustered along the bole and branches. The fruits are berries and have a pointy pentagon shape to it unlike any other baccaurea fruit, 5–6 cm long by 2.3–2.6 cm in diameter, have a star-shaped cross-section, and are dark purple when immature, ripening bright red, has a hard but easy-to-open shell, with the seeds contained in an edible, white arillode.

== Distribution and habitat ==
The species is endemic to Borneo. It occurs in lowland and hill mixed dipterocarp, riverine and secondary forests, up to an elevation of 800 m.

== Usage ==
The species is often cultivated in villages as well as the fruits being collected from the wild and sold in markets. The epicarp may be made into preserves and the pulp juiced.
