= Khlong Om Non =

Canal in Greater Bangkok, Thailand

Coordinates: 13°50′40.76″N 100°29′50.32″E

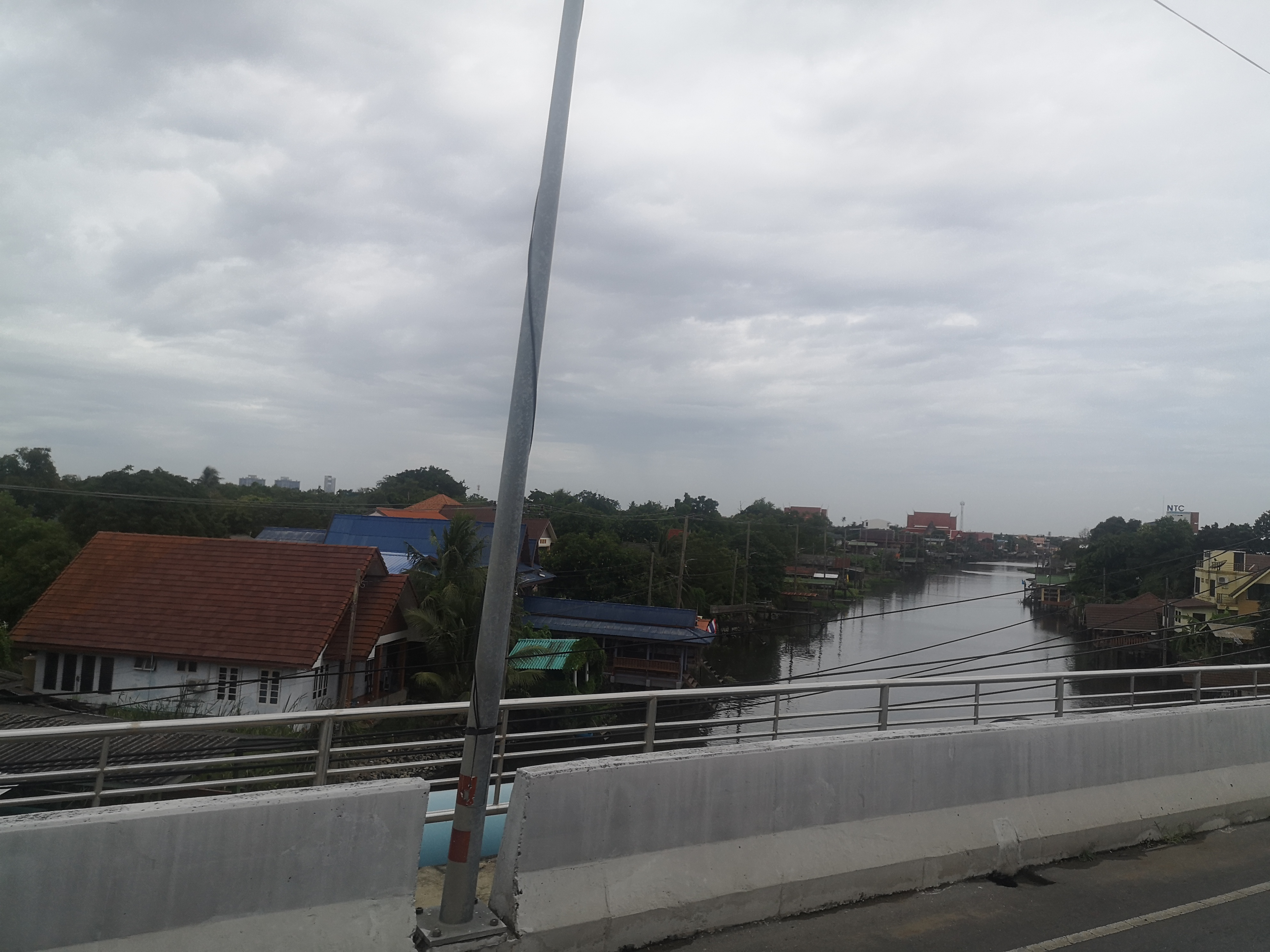
- Khlong Om Non in the area near Bang Rak Noi
- Interactive map of Khlong Om Non

Specifications
- Length: 17.5 km (10.9 miles)

Geography
- Start point: Nonthaburi
- End point: Bang Kruai
- Connects to: Chao Phraya River, Khlong Lat Bang Kruai, Khlong Bangkok Noi

Khlong Om Non (Thai: คลองอ้อมนนท์, pronounced [kʰlɔ̄ːŋ ʔɔ̂ːm nōn]) is a branch of the Chao Phraya River in Nonthaburi Province, part of Greater Bangkok. It is now regarded as a continuation of Khlong Bangkok Noi.

The khlong was originally the river's main watercourse, but became reduced when a bypass canal was dug in accordance with the orders of King Prasat Thong in the middle of the late Ayutthaya period to reduce the distance between Ayutthaya and the sea. Its history is similar to Khlong Bangkok Yai and Khlong Bangkok Noi in Bangkok, in that the shortcut route's completion caused the original course of the Chao Phraya River to be reduced to only a khlong.

Khlong Om Non is currently a waterway that is separated from the Chao Phraya River at Mueang Nonthaburi District, then enters Bang Yai District to the south, then flows into the Chao Phraya River in Bang Kruai District (where it is referred to as Khlong Bang Kruai), with a total length of 17.5 km (10.9 mi).

It is regarded as one of main watercourses of Nonthaburi Province, besides the Chao Phraya River.

Originally, the province was called "Ban Talat Khwan" (บ้านตลาดขวัญ) and was a Bangkok's outpost. Later, in 1549–1550 during the reign of King Maha Chakkraphat, many people from Ayutthaya Kingdom to settle here after the war with Hanthawaddy. The king established two new towns together and renamed them "Nonthaburi" for Ban Talat Khwan and "Sakhon Buri" for Ban Tha Chin (now Samut Sakhon Province).

In 1665–1666 during the reign of King Narai the Great, the king ordered the construction of twin wooden forts on the khlong mouth, names "Pom Thapthim" (ป้อมทับทิม) on the left side and "Pom Kaeo" (ป้อมแก้ว) on the right side, along with moving of the Nonthaburi capital district to the left side of the khlong (west side of Chao Phraya River) and the construction of a city pillar shrine. The capital district and provincial hall were relocated twice in the Rattanakosin period (at present, it is the Old Nonthaburi Provincial Hall next to Nonthaburi Pier).

Its name "Khlong Om Non", means "Nonthaburi roundabout canal", referring to its course. Other names that have been used include Khlong Om (คลองอ้อม), Maenam Om (แม่น้ำอ้อม), and Khlong Maenam Om (คลองแม่น้ำอ้อม).

Currently, Khlong Om Non is another cultural tourism route, as well as other nearby khlongs. The two sides are filled with many tourist attractions such as many ancient temples and antique wooden traditional Thai houses or durian estates with eateries.
