= Baccaurea odoratissima =

Conservation status
- Vulnerable (IUCN 2.3)

Scientific classification
- Kingdom: Plantae
- Clade: Tracheophytes
- Clade: Angiosperms
- Clade: Eudicots
- Clade: Rosids
- Order: Malpighiales
- Family: Phyllanthaceae
- Genus: Baccaurea
- Species: B. odoratissima

Binomial name
- Baccaurea odoratissima Elmer

Synonyms
- Baccaurea membranacea Pax & K.Hoffm. Baccaurea trunciflora Merr.

Species of flowering plant

Baccaurea odoratissima is a species of plant in the family Phyllanthaceae. It is endemic to the Philippines.
