= Baccaurea pubera =

Conservation status
- Least Concern (IUCN 3.1)

Scientific classification
- Kingdom: Plantae
- Clade: Tracheophytes
- Clade: Angiosperms
- Clade: Eudicots
- Clade: Rosids
- Order: Malpighiales
- Family: Phyllanthaceae
- Genus: Baccaurea
- Species: B. pubera

Binomial name
- Baccaurea pubera (Miq.) Müll.Arg.

Synonyms
- Pierardia pubera Miq.; Baccaurea elmeri Merr.; Baccaurea latifolia King ex Hook.f.; Baccaurea puberula Merr.

Species of flowering plant

Baccaurea pubera is a flowering plant in the family Phyllanthaceae. It is native to Southeast Asia.

== Description ==
Baccaurea pubera grows as a tree from 6–25 m (20–80 ft) tall, with a trunk diameter of up to 40 cm (16 in). It occasionally has buttresses, which may extend to 30 cm (12 in). The pear-shaped fruit is locally eaten.

== Taxonomy ==
The species was first described in 1861 as Pierardia pubera by Dutch botanist Friedrich Anton Wilhelm Miquel in Flora van Nederlandsch Indie (Flora of the Netherlands Indies). In 1866, Swiss botanist Johannes Müller Argoviensis transferred the species to the genus Baccaurea.

== Distribution and habitat ==
Baccaurea pubera is native to Borneo (where it occurs widely), Peninsular Malaysia, Sumatra and Sulawesi. Its habitat is in lowland forests to elevations of 300 m (1,000 ft).

== Conservation ==
Baccaurea pubera has been assessed as least concern on the IUCN Red List. It is threatened by deforestation and by conversion of land for plantations and agriculture. In some areas it is also threatened by urban development. However, the species is present in numerous protected areas.
