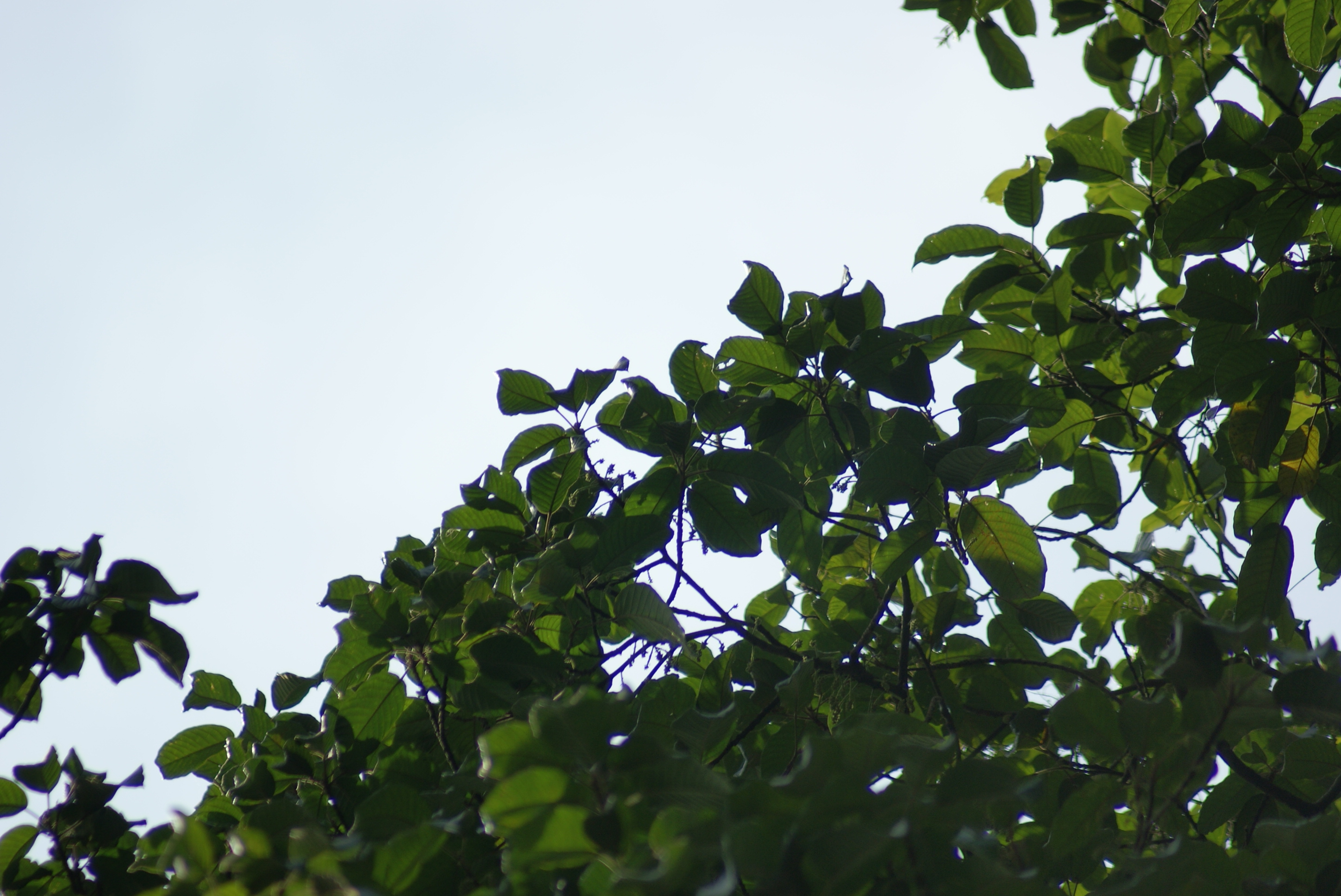

Scientific classification
- Kingdom: Plantae
- Clade: Tracheophytes
- Clade: Angiosperms
- Clade: Eudicots
- Clade: Rosids
- Order: Malpighiales
- Family: Phyllanthaceae
- Genus: Baccaurea
- Species: B. macrocarpa

Binomial name
- Baccaurea macrocarpa Müll.Arg.

Synonyms
- Baccaurea borneensis (Müll.Arg.) Müll.Arg.; Baccaurea griffithii Hook.f.; Mappa borneensis Müll.Arg.; Pierardia macrocarpa Miq.

= Baccaurea macrocarpa =

Species of tree

Baccaurea macrocarpa, also called tampoi, is a small, tropical rainforest substory fruit tree in the family Phyllanthaceae native to Southeast Asia, especially Borneo. It is dioecious, and the female tree bear fruit directly on the trunk and large branches. The fruit is large, orange-skinned, white-fleshed, with a delicious tangy flavour somewhat like mandarin (tangerine). Depending on conditions, the fruit may closely clothe the trunk beautifully, like the fruit of many Ficus species.

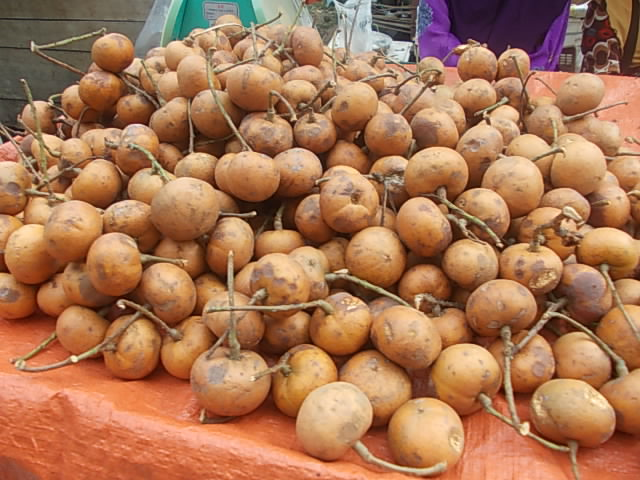
Ripe fruits sold in Malaysia

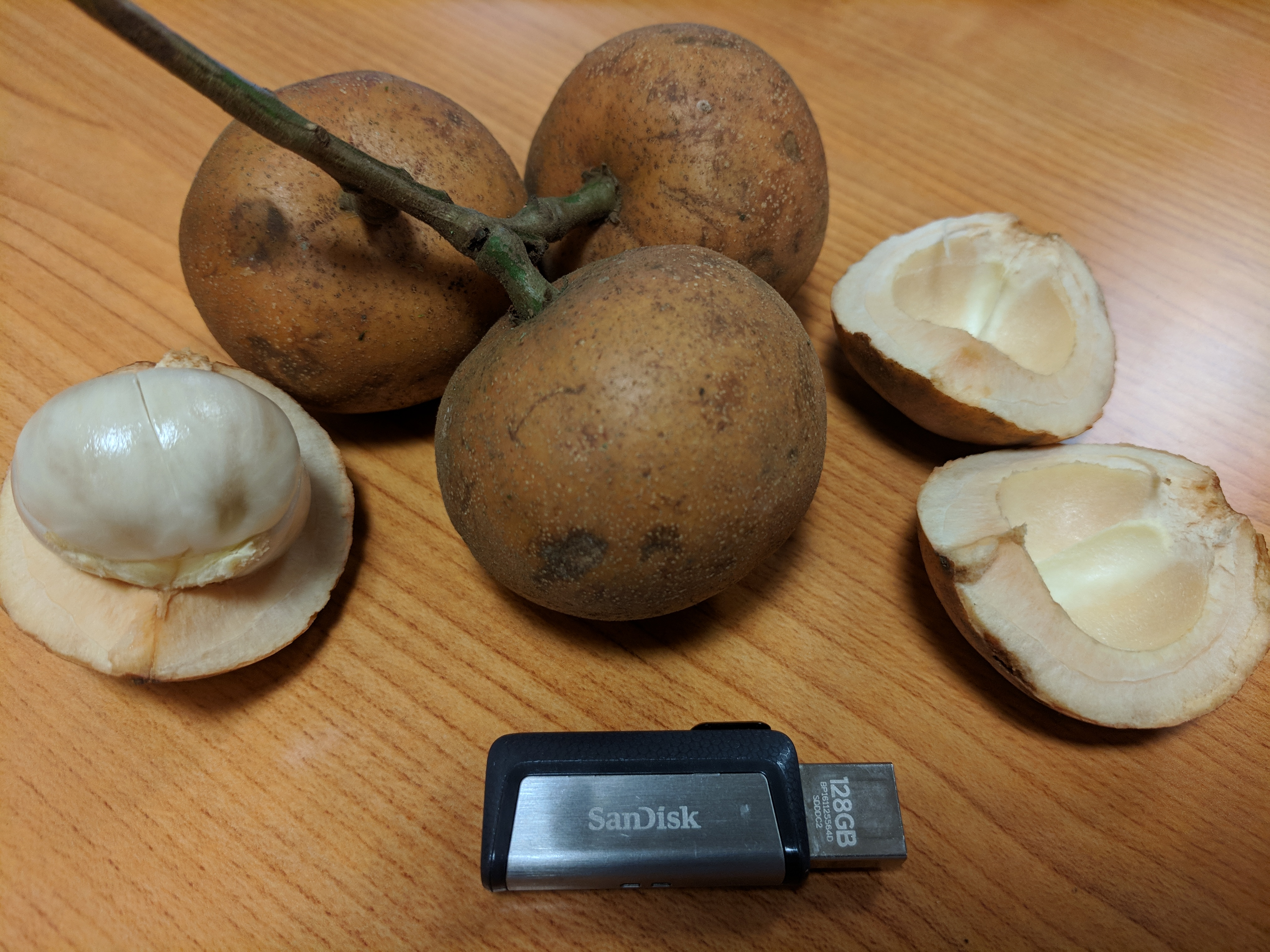
Baccaurea macrocarpa size comparison
