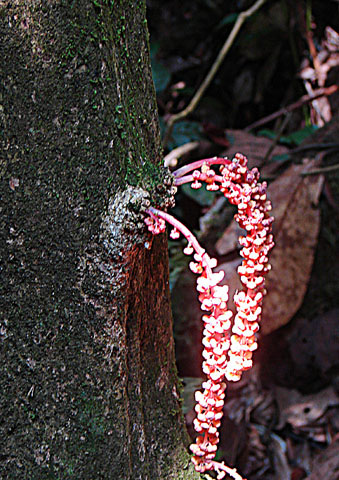

Scientific classification
- Kingdom: Plantae
- Clade: Tracheophytes
- Clade: Angiosperms
- Clade: Eudicots
- Clade: Rosids
- Order: Malpighiales
- Family: Phyllanthaceae
- Genus: Baccaurea
- Species: B. lanceolata

Binomial name
- Baccaurea lanceolata (Miq.) Müll.Arg.

Synonyms
- Adenocrepis lanceolata (Miq.) Müll.Arg.; Baccaurea glabriflora Pax & K.Hoffm.; Baccaurea pyrrhodasya (Miq.) Müll.Arg.; Hedycarpus lanceolatus Miq.; Pierardia pyrrhodasya Miq.

= Baccaurea lanceolata =

Species of flowering plant

Baccaurea lanceolata is a species of plant in the family Phyllanthaceae. It is found in Malaysia, Indonesia and Thailand. It grows in lowland rainforest, at an altitude between sea level and 1,300 metres (4,300 ft).
