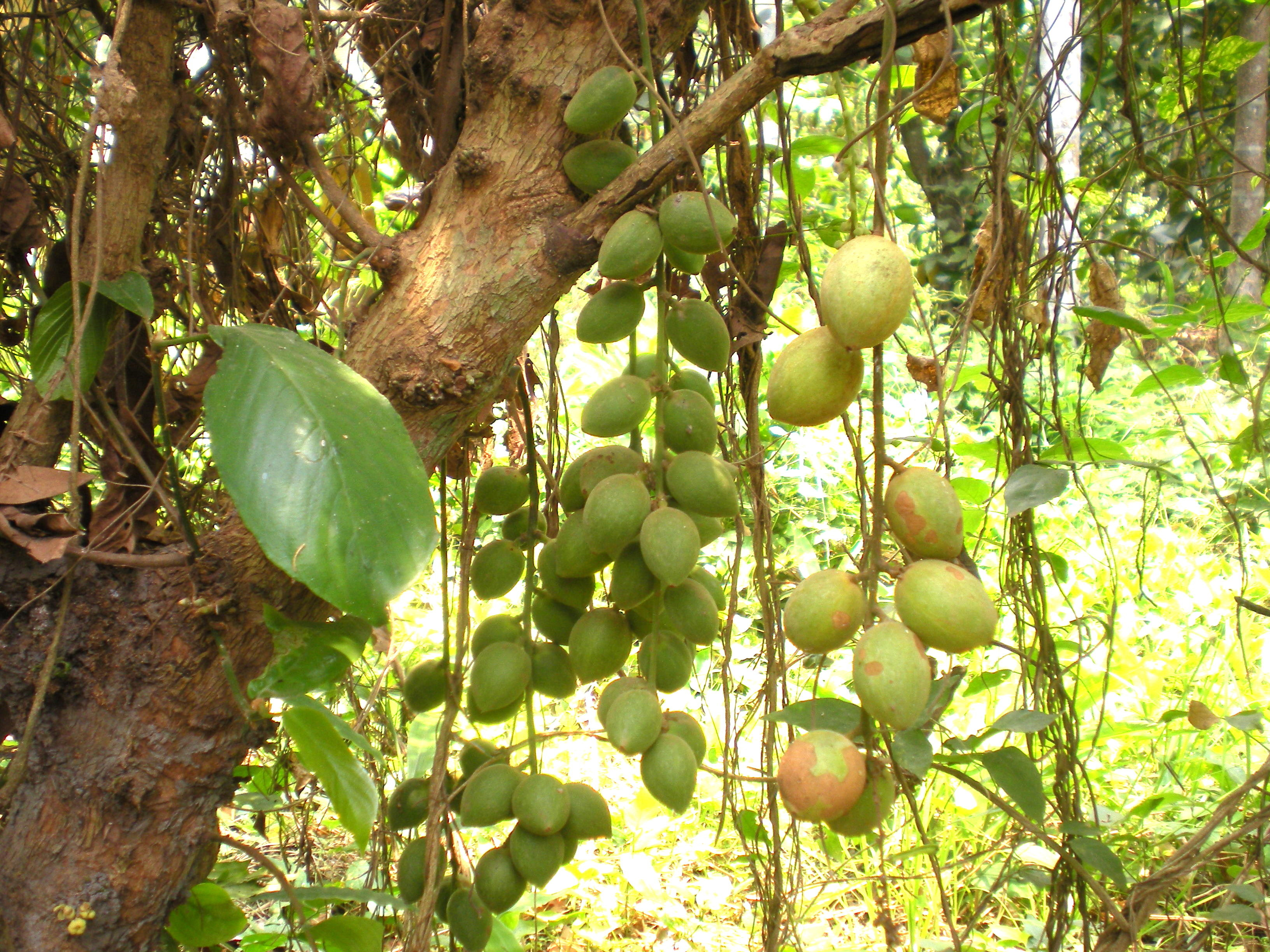
- In Ho Chi Minh City, Vietnam

Conservation status
- Least Concern (IUCN 3.1)

Scientific classification
- Kingdom: Plantae
- Clade: Embryophytes
- Clade: Tracheophytes
- Clade: Angiosperms
- Clade: Eudicots
- Clade: Rosids
- Order: Malpighiales
- Family: Phyllanthaceae
- Genus: Baccaurea
- Species: B. ramiflora

Binomial name
- Baccaurea ramiflora Lour.

Synonyms
- Heterotypic Synonyms: Baccaurea cauliflora Lour.; Baccaurea flaccida Müll.Arg.; Baccaurea oxycarpa Gagnep.; Baccaurea pierardi Wall.; Baccaurea propinqua Müll.Arg.; Baccaurea sapida (Roxb.) Müll.Arg.; Baccaurea wrayi King ex Hook.f.; Gatnaia annamica Gagnep.; Pierardia flaccida Wall.; Pierardia sapida Roxb.

= Baccaurea ramiflora =

Species of flowering plant

Baccaurea ramiflora is a species of flowering plant in the family Phyllanthaceae. This slow-growing evergreen tree is sometimes referred to in English by the common name Burmese grape. It grows up to 25 m (82 ft) in height, with a spreading crown and thin bark.

== Distribution ==
It is native to India (including the Andaman and Nicobar Islands and the Assam region), Nepal, Bangladesh, Cambodia, southern China (including Hainan), Laos, Peninsular Malaysia, Myanmar, Thailand, and Vietnam. It grows in evergreen forests on a wide range of soils.

== Uses ==
The fruit is harvested and used locally, eaten as a fruit, stewed or made into wine; it is also used medicinally to treat skin diseases. The bark, roots and wood are harvested for medicinal uses. The fruit is oval, colored yellowish, pinkish to bright red or purple, 2.5–3.5 cm (0.98–1.38 in) in diameter, glabrous, with 2–4 large purple-red seed, with white aril.

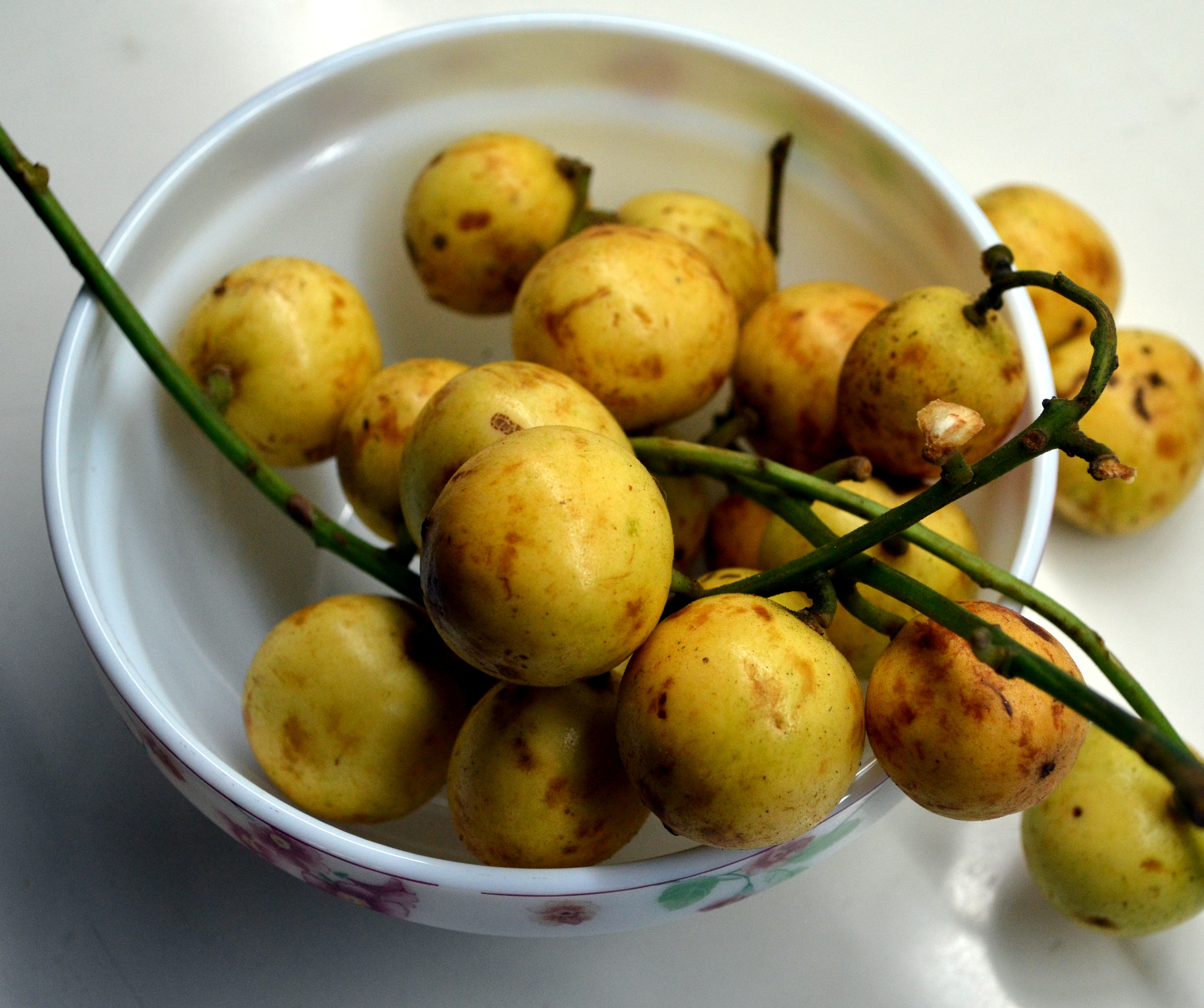
Ripe fruits of Burmese grape

The bark, roots, and wood are dried and ground before boiling in water. Fruits can be kept fresh for 4–5 days, or boiled and mixed with salt after which it keeps well in closed jars. The fruit has marginal importance, used and sold locally.
