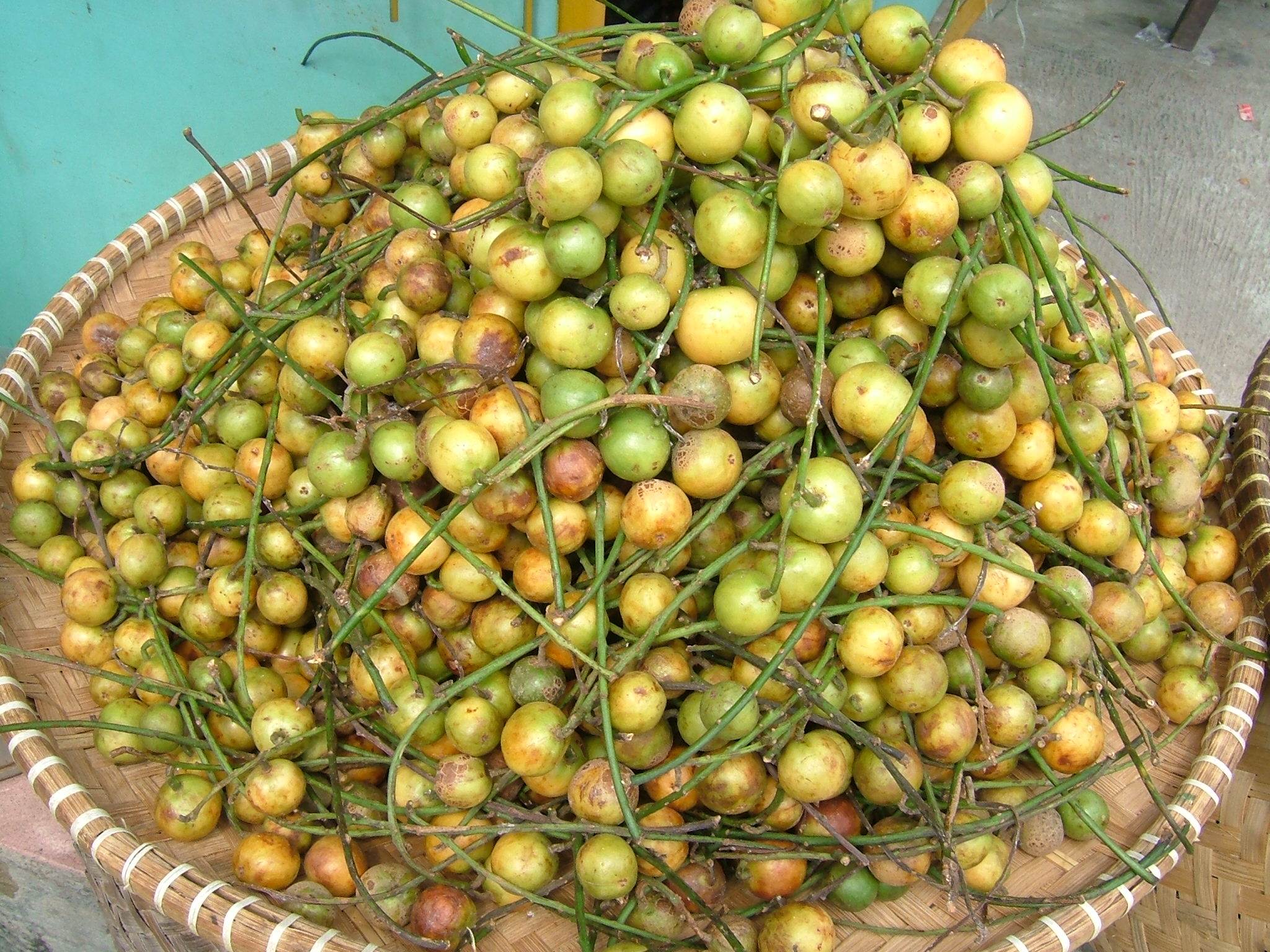
- Fruits of Baccaurea racemosa

Scientific classification
- Kingdom: Plantae
- Clade: Embryophytes
- Clade: Tracheophytes
- Clade: Spermatophytes
- Clade: Angiosperms
- Clade: Eudicots
- Clade: Rosids
- Order: Malpighiales
- Family: Phyllanthaceae
- Subfamily: Antidesmatoideae
- Tribe: Scepeae
- Genus: Baccaurea; Lour. (1790)

Type species
- Baccaurea ramiflora

Species
- See text

Synonyms
- Adenocrepis Blume (1826); Calyptroon Miq. (1861); Coccomelia Reinw. (1825); Everettiodendron Merr. (1909); Gatnaia Gagnep. (1924 publ. 1925); Hedycarpus Jack (1823); Microsepala Miq. (1861); Pierardia Roxb. (1832)

= Baccaurea =

Genus of flowering plants

Baccaurea is a genus of flowering plants belonging to the family Phyllanthaceae. The genus comprises 51 species, distributed from India to Indochina, southern China, Malesia, New Guinea, and the West Pacific. It is dioecious, with male and female flowers on separate plants. Many species produce edible fruits.

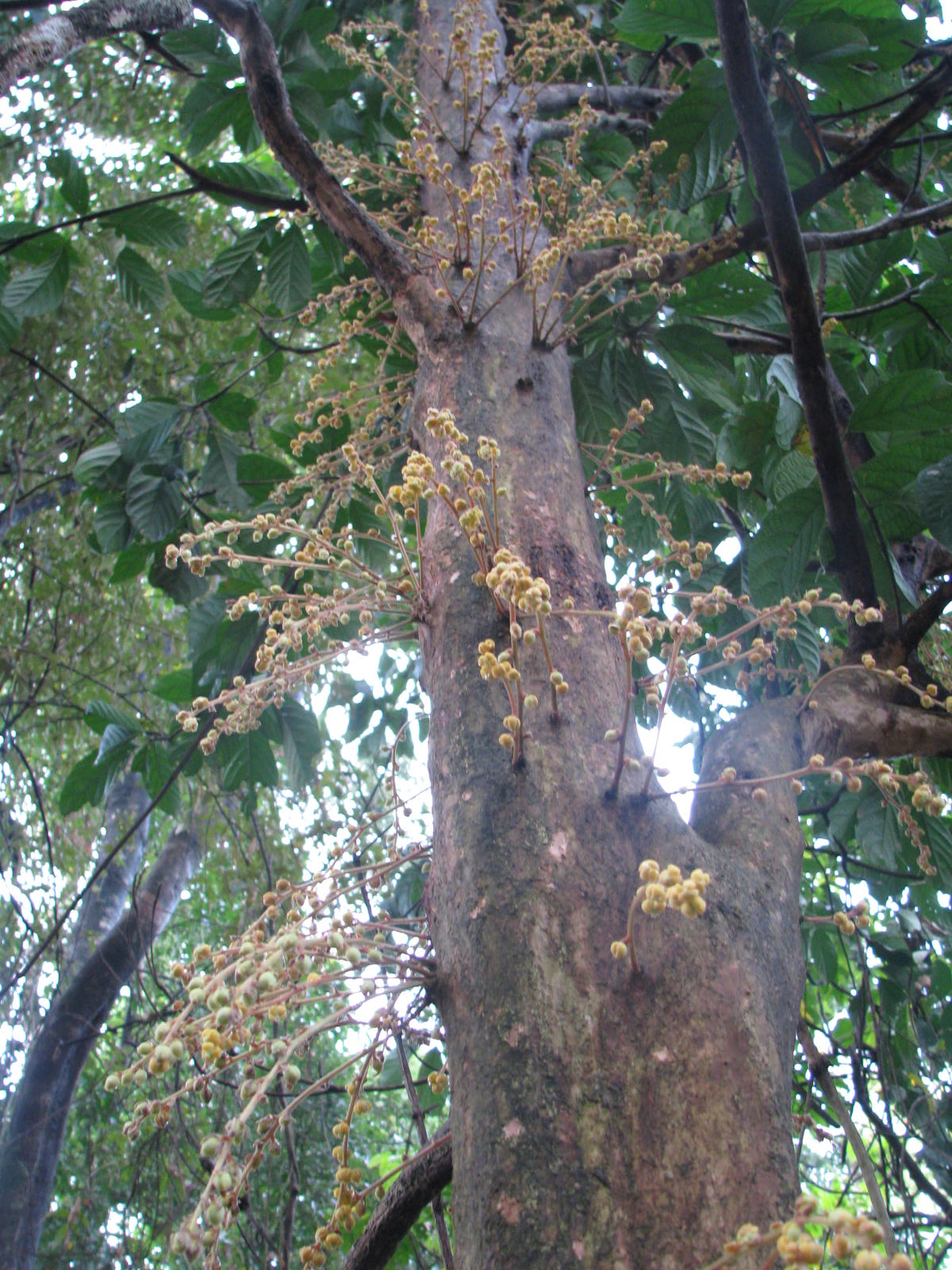
Baccaurea sapida in Pakke Tiger Reserve, India

== Species ==
51 species are accepted.

- Baccaurea airyshawii Chakrab. & M.Gangop.
- Baccaurea angulata Merr.
- Baccaurea annamensis Gagnep.
- Baccaurea bakeri Elmer ex Merr.
- Baccaurea bracteata Müll.Arg.
- Baccaurea brevipes Hook.f.
- Baccaurea carinata Haegens
- Baccaurea celebica Pax & K.Hoffm.
- Baccaurea costulata (Miq.) Müll.Arg.
- Baccaurea courtallensis (Wight) Müll.Arg.
- Baccaurea dasystachya (Miq.) Müll.Arg.
- Baccaurea deflexa Müll.Arg.
- Baccaurea dolichobotrys Merr.
- Baccaurea dulcis (Jack) Müll.Arg.
- Baccaurea edulis Merr.
- Baccaurea henii Thìn
- Baccaurea javanica (Blume) Müll.Arg.
- Baccaurea lanceolata (Miq.) Müll.Arg.
- Baccaurea macrocarpa (Miq.) Müll.Arg.
- Baccaurea macrophylla (Müll.Arg.) Müll.Arg.
- Baccaurea maingayi Hook.f.
- Baccaurea malayana King ex Hook.f.
- Baccaurea microcarpa (Airy Shaw) Haegens
- Baccaurea minor Hook.f.
- Baccaurea mollis Haegens
- Baccaurea motleyana (Müll.Arg.) Müll.Arg.
- Baccaurea multiflora Burck ex J.J.Sm.
- Baccaurea nanihua Merr.
- Baccaurea nesophila Airy Shaw
- Baccaurea odoratissima Elmer
- Baccaurea papuana F.M.Bailey
- Baccaurea parviflora (Müll.Arg.) Müll.Arg.
- Baccaurea philippinensis (Merr.) Merr.
- Baccaurea polyneura Hook.f. (syn. Baccaurea hookeri Gage)
- Baccaurea ptychopyxis Airy Shaw
- Baccaurea pubera (Miq.) Müll.Arg. (syn. Baccaurea latifolia King ex Hook.f.)
- Baccaurea purpurea Haegens
- Baccaurea pyriformis Gage
- Baccaurea racemosa (Reinw.) Müll.Arg.
- Baccaurea ramiflora Lour.
- Baccaurea reniformis Chakrab. & M.Gangop.
- Baccaurea reticulata Hook.f.
- Baccaurea sarawakensis Pax & K.Hoffm.
- Baccaurea seemannii (Müll.Arg.) Müll.Arg.
- Baccaurea simaloerensis Haegens
- Baccaurea sumatrana (Miq.) Müll.Arg.
- Baccaurea sylvestris Lour.
- Baccaurea taitensis Müll.Arg.
- Baccaurea tetrandra (Baill.) Müll.Arg.
- Baccaurea trigonocarpa Merr.
- Baccaurea velutina (Ridl.) Ridl.
