= Wang Lang =

Wang Lang may refer to:

- Wang Lang (Xin dynasty) (died 24), warlord during the Xin-Eastern Han transition
- Wang Lang (Cao Wei) (died 228), minor warlord during the late Han period who became an official of Cao Wei
- Wang Lang Market, in Bangkok Noi, Thailand
- Prannok Pier or Wang Lang Pier, pier on the Chao Phraya River near Wang Lang Market

== See also ==
- Wang Lan (1922–2003), painter and author
