= Fai Chai Junction =

Road intersection in Bangkok, Thailand

Coordinates: 13°47′17.27″N 100°28′10.16″E

Fai Chai
- ไฟฉาย
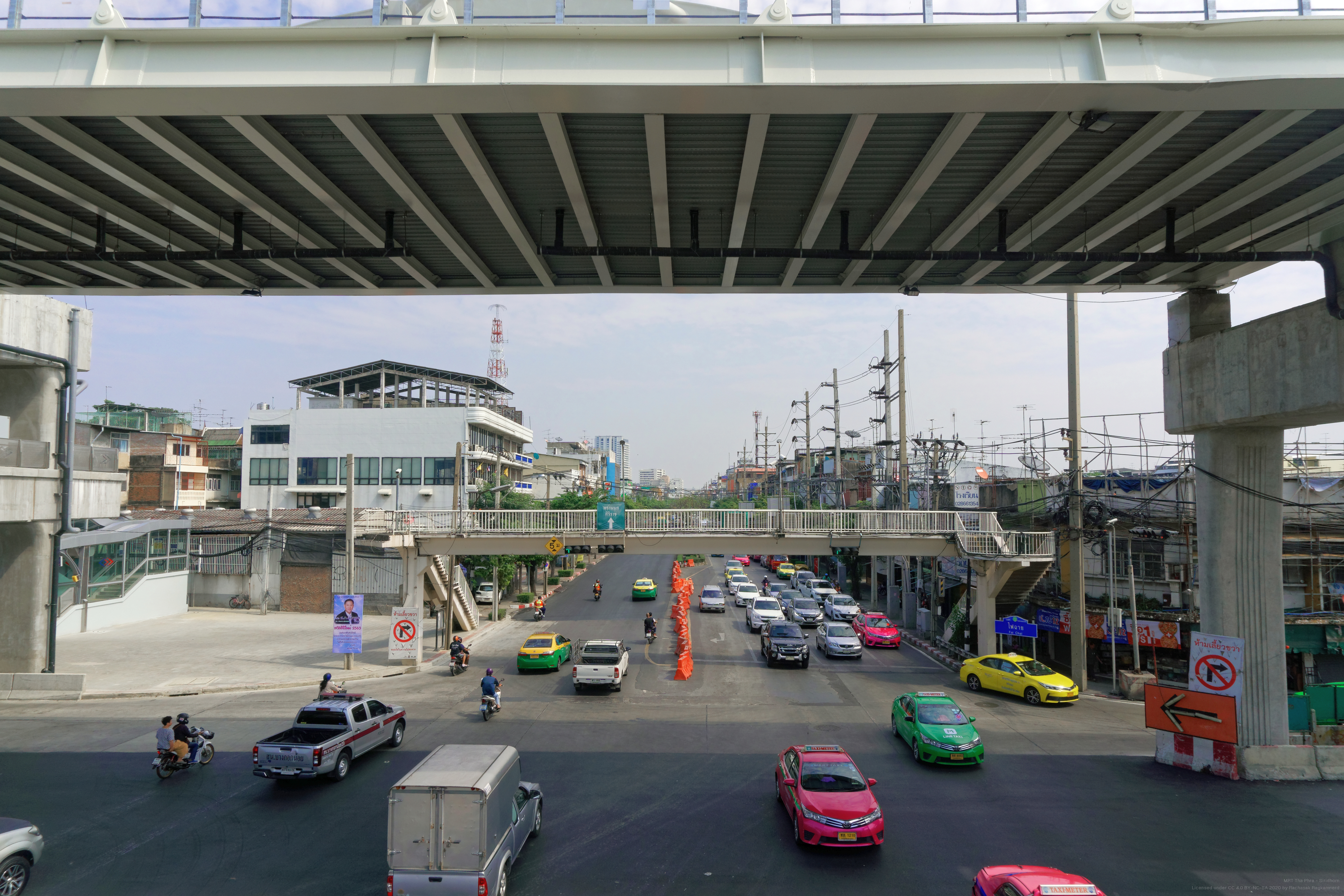
- Fai Chai Junction in late 2019 (seen from Phran Nok–Phutthamonthon Sai 4 Road to Phran Nok Road)
- Interactive map of Fai Chai

Location
- Ban Chang Lo and Bang Khun Si, Bangkok Noi, Bangkok, Thailand
- Roads at junction: Charan Sanit Wong (north–south); Phran Nok (east); Phran Nok–Phutthamonthon Sai 4 (west)

Construction
- Type: Four-way at-grade intersection, multi-way footbridge, tunnel and MRT tracks with its station

Fai Chai, also written as Faichai (Thai: ไฟฉาย, RTGS: Faichai, pronounced [fāj.t͡ɕʰǎːj]), is a four-way intersection in Bangkok located in Ban Chang Lo and Bang Khun Si Subdistricts, Bangkok Noi District, Thonburi side. It is the junction of Charan Sanit Wong, Phran Nok and Phran Nok–Phutthamonthon Sai 4 Roads, can be considered as another main intersection of Thonburi side, besides Tha Phra and Borommaratchachonnani. The boundaries of the junction are considered to be where Phran Nok–Phutthamonthon Sai 4 Road ends, and where Phran Nok Road originate. It is also a location of Fai Chai MRT station.

The name is derived from the Asia-Pacific War (part of World War II) from 1941 to 1945 when Bangkok was attacked by the Allied bombers at night, especially Bangkok Noi, because it was the location of the Imperial Japanese Army base and close to many important places, such as Bangkok Noi railway station, Siriraj Hospital, Naval Dockyard Department and Royal Grand Palace in Phra Nakhon side, etc.

The Thai military units tried to establish defense measures the best way possible by installing searchlights in different places. These searchlights had to co-ordinate in looking for the aircraft of the Allied. When the targets were spotted, they would be gunned down by the anti-aircraft artillery. The artillery of such power must have a caliber of seventy-five millimeters in diameter. Hence, the area where once the searchlights were installed has been known as "Fai Chai" (literally means searchlight) since then.

It founded in 1941 from the expansion of Pran Nok Road, during that time, it was only a T junction. Later in 2015, there was an extension of Phran Nok–Phutthamonthon 4 Road from Taling Chan District to alleviate traffic problems, thus making it into a four-way intersection in the present.

From the early 1960s to the late 1980s, the Fai Chai area was home to the Southern Bus Terminal (later relocated to Taling Chan), a market, the Nakornloung Shopping Center, and the namesake movie theater. Nearby, Soi Charan Sanit Wong 27, also known as Soi Buppha Sawan, was a hub for many popular luk thung (Thai country music) talent agencies. Today, none of these remain.

Fai Chai tunnel, which is an underpass along Charan Sanit Wong Road direction, took 13 years to complete the construction. The Bt788-million project, which is being carried out by Kamphaeng Phet Wiwat Construction, began in October 2009 during the tenure of Bangkok governor MR Sukhumbhand Paribatra. However, construction progress has been delayed by disputes over its size, design and overlap with the MRT Blue Line's Bang Sue–Tha Phra portion. The disputes prompted several revisions of the contract. The tunnel was opened for the first day on August 1, 2022 along with an overpass across Na Ranong intersection in Khlong Toei District, where Ratchadaphisek crosses Rama III, Sunthonkosa and Na Ranong Roads. The first phase of activation will only be open from 5am to 10pm as some of the decorations have not been completed.

== See also ==
- Thailand in World War II
- Bombing of Bangkok in World War II
