= Wat Amarinthraram =

Buddhist temple in Thailand

Coordinates: 13°45′36″N 100°29′01″E

Wat Amarinthraram Worawihan
- วัดอมรินทราราม
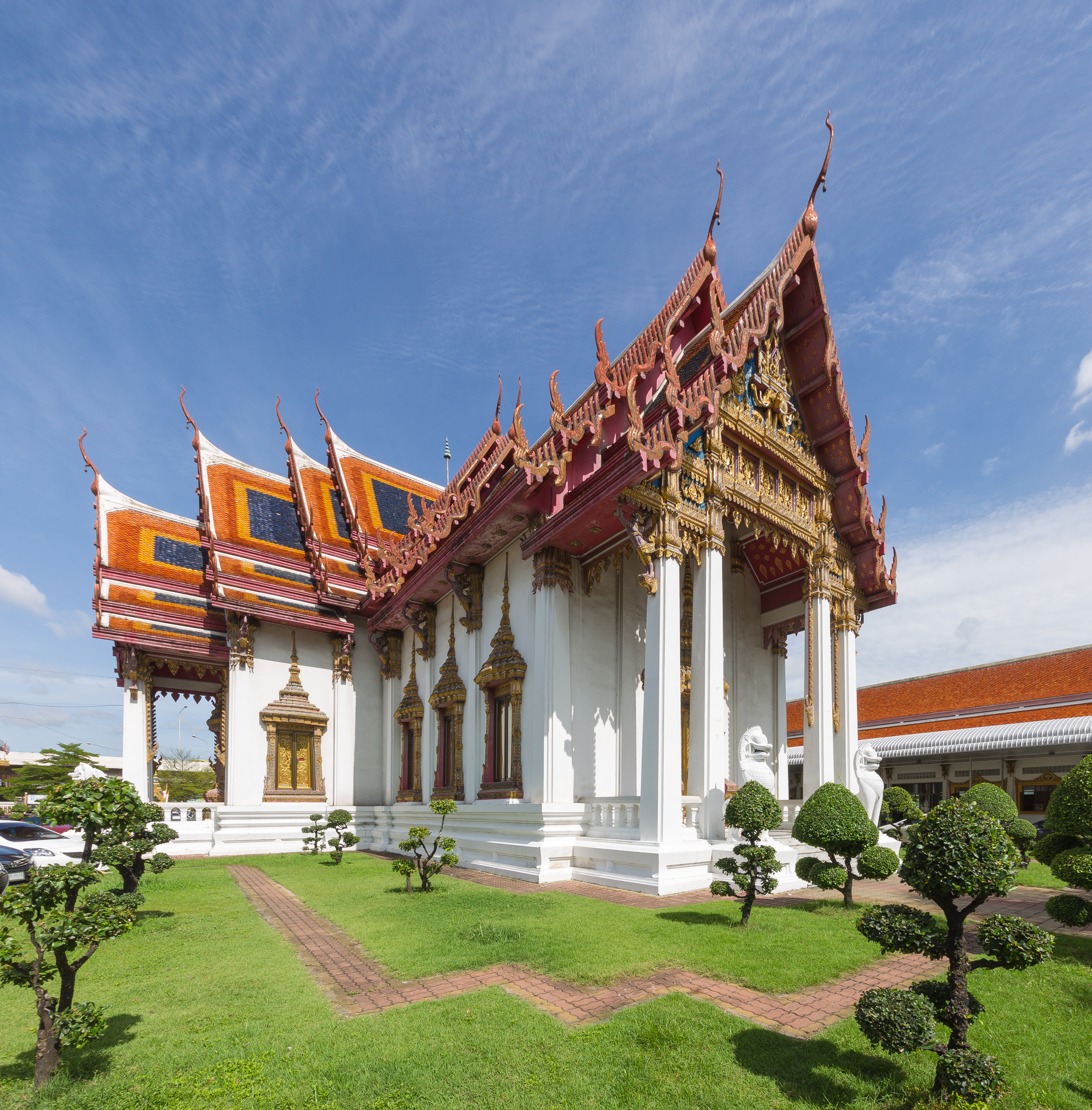
- Main hall

- Location within Thailand

Religion
- Affiliation: Buddhism
- Sect: Theravāda, Mahā Nikāya
- Region: central Thailand

Location
- Location: 566 Arun Ammarin Rd, Siriraj, Bangkok Noi, Bangkok
- Country: Thailand
- Interactive map of Wat Amarinthraram Worawihan

Architecture
- Founder: Unknown

Wat Amarinthraram (Thai: วัดอมรินทรารามวรวิหาร), or known in short as Wat Amarinthraram or just Wat Amarin is a Thai Buddhist temple in Thailand. It is located on the southward of canal Khlong Bangkok Noi, next to the Siriraj Piyamaharajkarun Hospital and Bangkok Noi railway station near the foot of Arun Ammarin bridge, considered as the temple that is nearest to Siriraj Hospital.

It is an ancient temple dating back to the Ayutthaya period (around 1657–58), although it is not known who built it. Previously, it was called "Wat Bang Wa Noi" (วัดบางหว้าน้อย) in pair with Wat Bangwa Yai (วัดบางหว้าใหญ่) nearby, or Wat Rakhangkhositaram in present day.

In the King Taksin's reign during Thonburi period, the temple has been promoted to be a royal monastery.

In the early Rattanakosin period, the King Phutthayotfa Chulalok (Rama I) gave the name to the Wat Amarinthraram (Śakra temple) which remains today.

Since then, it has undergone renovations and had various additions to the permanent structures during each reign.

Presently, the temple is classified as the third rank of royal monastery.

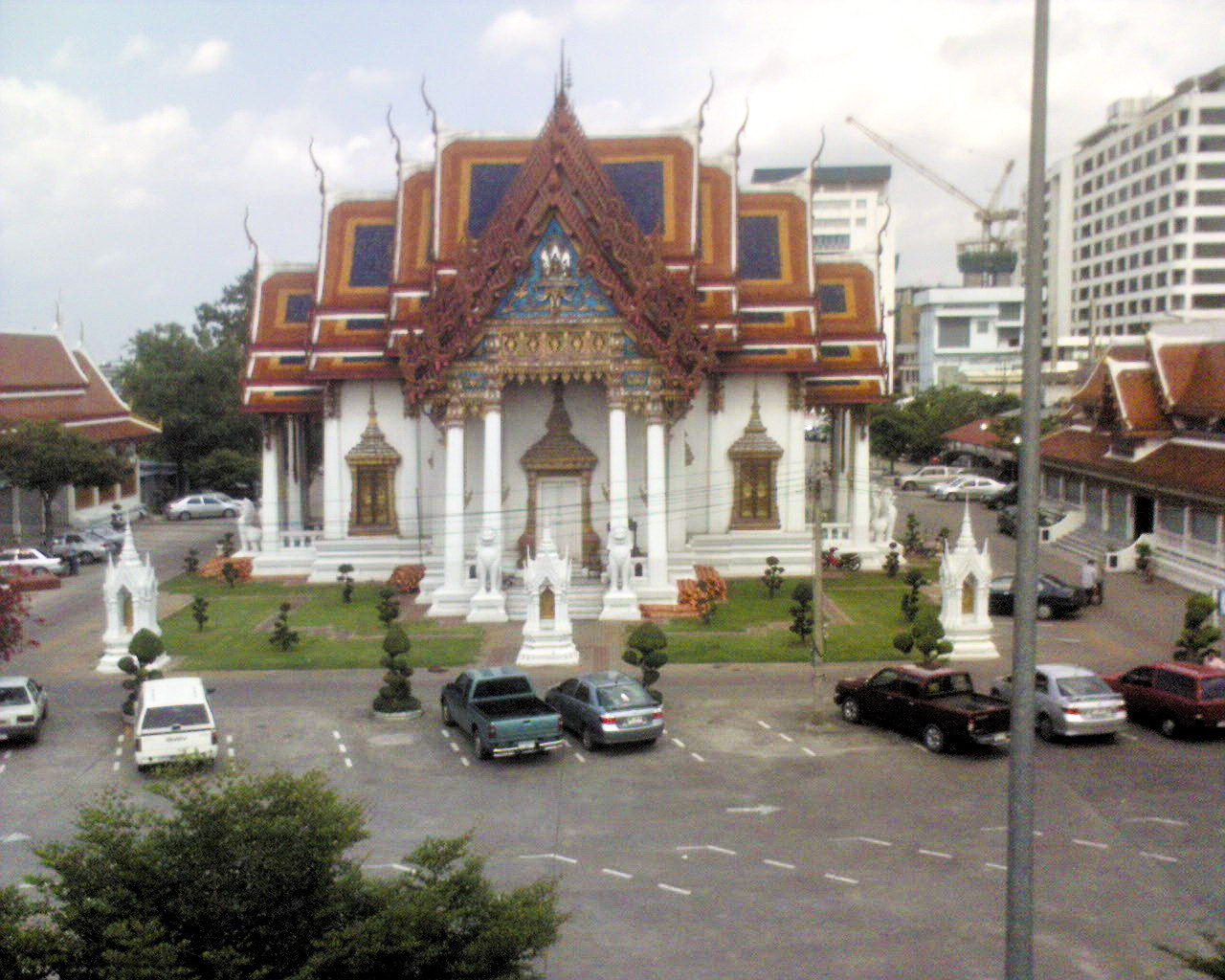
Wat Amarinthraram seen from Arun Ammarin bridge

The attraction of the temple is the principal Buddha statue of Luang Pho Bot Noi (หลวงพ่อโบสถ์น้อย), which is as the name says, located in the chapel behind the main hall. It is a Sukhothai-style statue in Māravijaya attitude. Hence the name "Luang Pho Bot Noi" (chapel venerable father), and this name also became the unofficial name of the temple, Wat Luang Pho Bot Noi. The temple was heavily damaged by Allied bombings during World War II and the only building which was still standing was the chapel.

Another interesting thing of this temple is the replica of Buddha's footprint that is inside the pavilion. In the year 2010, the Buddha's footprint pavilion is preserved by the Fine Arts Department and Crown Property Bureau.

Wat Amarinthraram used to be the residence of Chuan Leekpai, two times prime minister of Thailand. When he was a Thammasat University student in the early 1960s.
