= Wat Nai Rong =

Buddhist temple in Bangkok, Thailand

- Wat Nok; Wat Pak Khlong
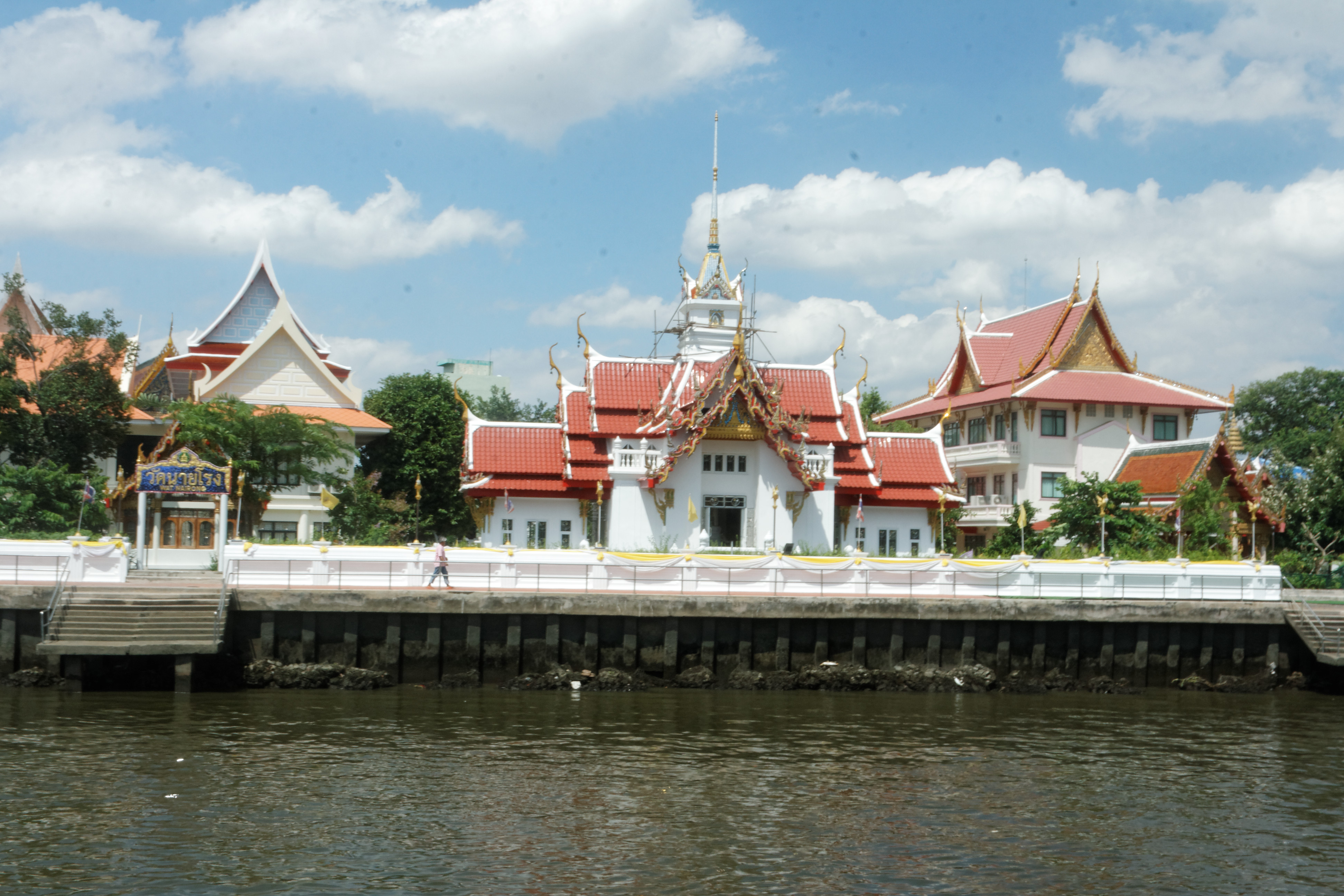
- The temple as seen from Khlong Bangkok Noi

- Location within Bangkok

Religion
- Affiliation: Buddhism
- Sect: Theravāda Mahā Nikāya
- Status: Civil temple

Location
- Location: 692 Soi Borommaratchachonnani 15, Borommaratchachonnani Rd, Arun Amarin, Bangkok Noi, Bangkok 10700
- Country: Thailand
- Interactive map of Wat Nai Rong
- Coordinates: 13.774593°N 100.471483°E

Architecture
- Founder: Krab
- Completed: 1860

Website
- https://watnairong.com/

Wat Nai Rong (Thai: วัดนายโรง) is a small Buddhist temple in Bangkok, built in the Rattanakosin period around 1860.
