= Arun Amarin subdistrict =

Khwaeng in Bangkok

Arun Amarin แขวงอรุณอมรินทร์
- Khwaeng
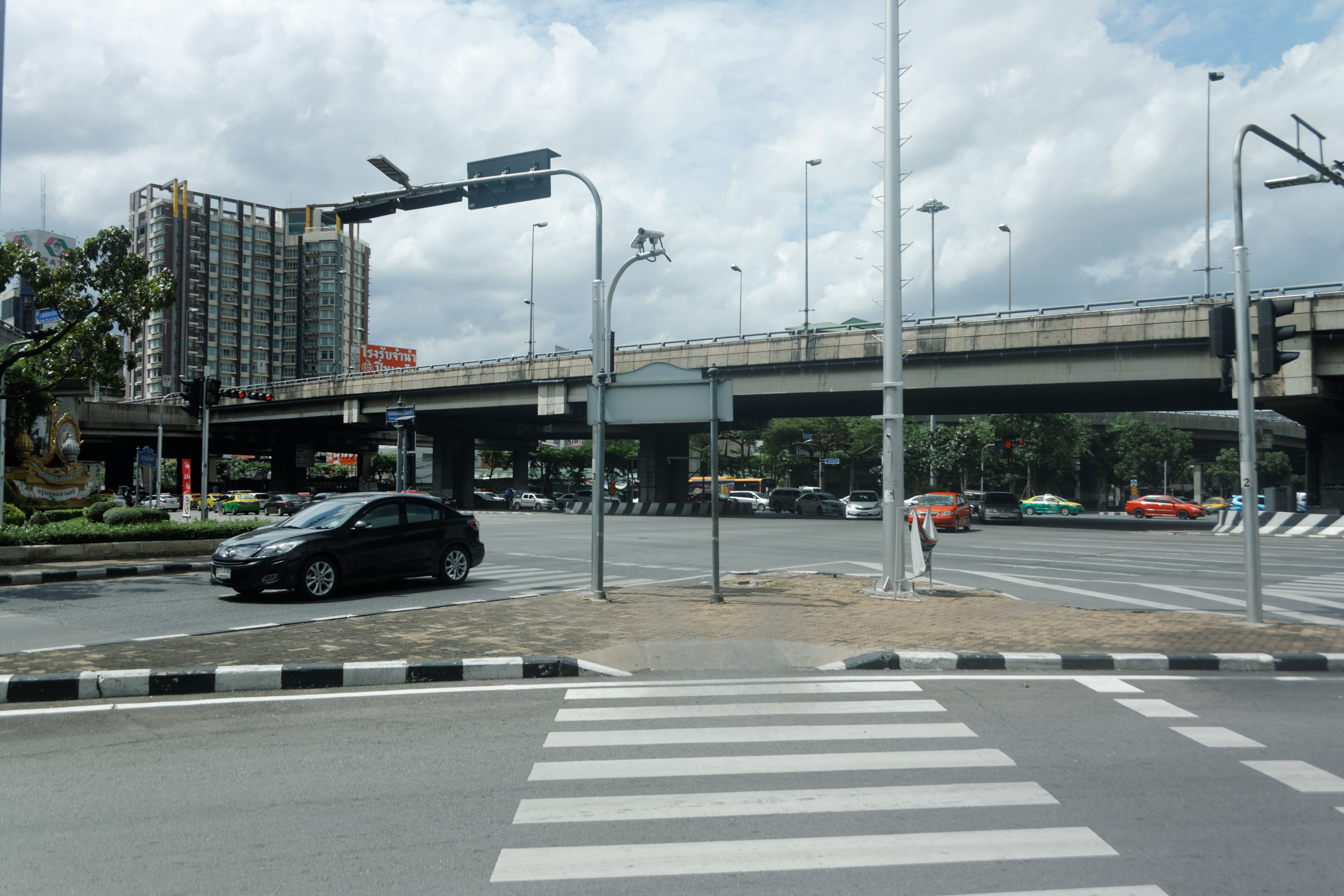
- Arun Amarin Intersection, where Arun Amarin meets Somdet Phra Pinklao Roads on the border with Bang Yi Khan of Bang Phlat District (taken from Arun Amarin side)

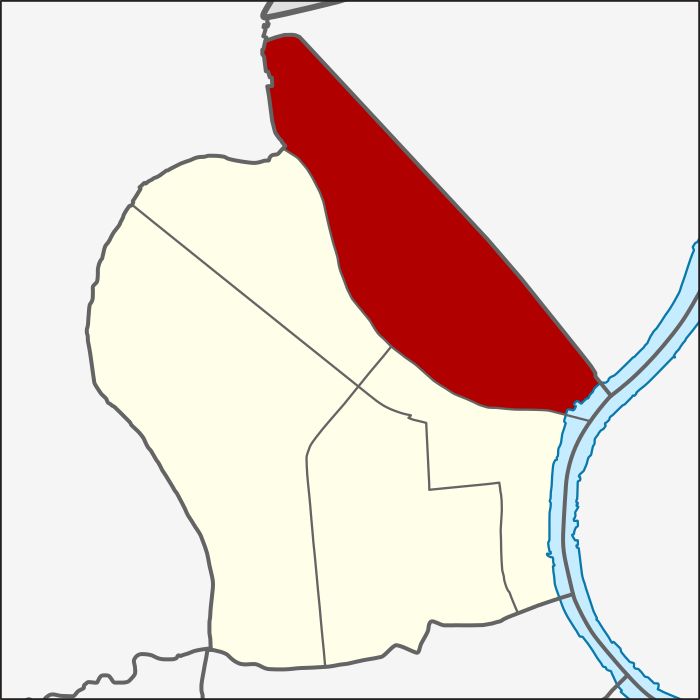
- Location in Bangkok Noi District
- Country: Thailand
- Province: Bangkok
- Khet: Bangkok Noi

Area
  - Total: 2.758 km^{2} (1.065 sq mi)

Population (2019)
  - Total: 19,882
- Time zone: UTC+7 (ICT)
- Postal code: 10700
- TIS 1099: 102009

Arun Amarin (Thai: อรุณอมรินทร์, pronounced [ʔā.rūn ʔā(m).mā.rīn]) is a khwaeng (subdistrict) of Bangkok Noi District, in Bangkok, Thailand. In 2019, it had a total population of 19,882 people.

== Naming ==
It is named after Arun Amarin Road, which runs through the area. This road begins at Wat Kanlaya in Thon Buri District, next to Suksanari School, and passes Ban Khamin, Siriraj Hospital, Wat Amarinthraram, and the National Museum of Royal Barges in Bangkok Noi District along Khlong Bangkok Noi. It ends at the Chao Phraya River in Bang Yi Khan, Bang Phlat District, beneath Rama VIII Bridge.

== Geography ==
Arun Amarin is considered a northernmost and second biggest part of the district (after Bang Khun Si).

It is bordered by neighbouring subdistricts (from the north clockwise): Bang Phlat and Bang Bamru of Bang Phlat District (Borommaratchachonnani Road is a borderline), Bang Yi Khan of Bang Phlat District (Somdet Phra Pinklao Road is a borderline), Phra Borom Maha Ratchawang of Phra Nakhon District and Siri Rat in its district (Chao Phraya River and Khlong Bangkok Noi are the borderlines), Bang Khun Non in its district and Khlong Chak Phra with Taling Chan of Taling Chan District (Khlong Bangkok Noi is a borderline), respectively.
