= Ratchawong Pier =

Pier in Bangkok, Thailand

Coordinates: 13°44′19.18″N 100°30′16.37″E

Ratchawong Pier ท่าเรือราชวงศ์
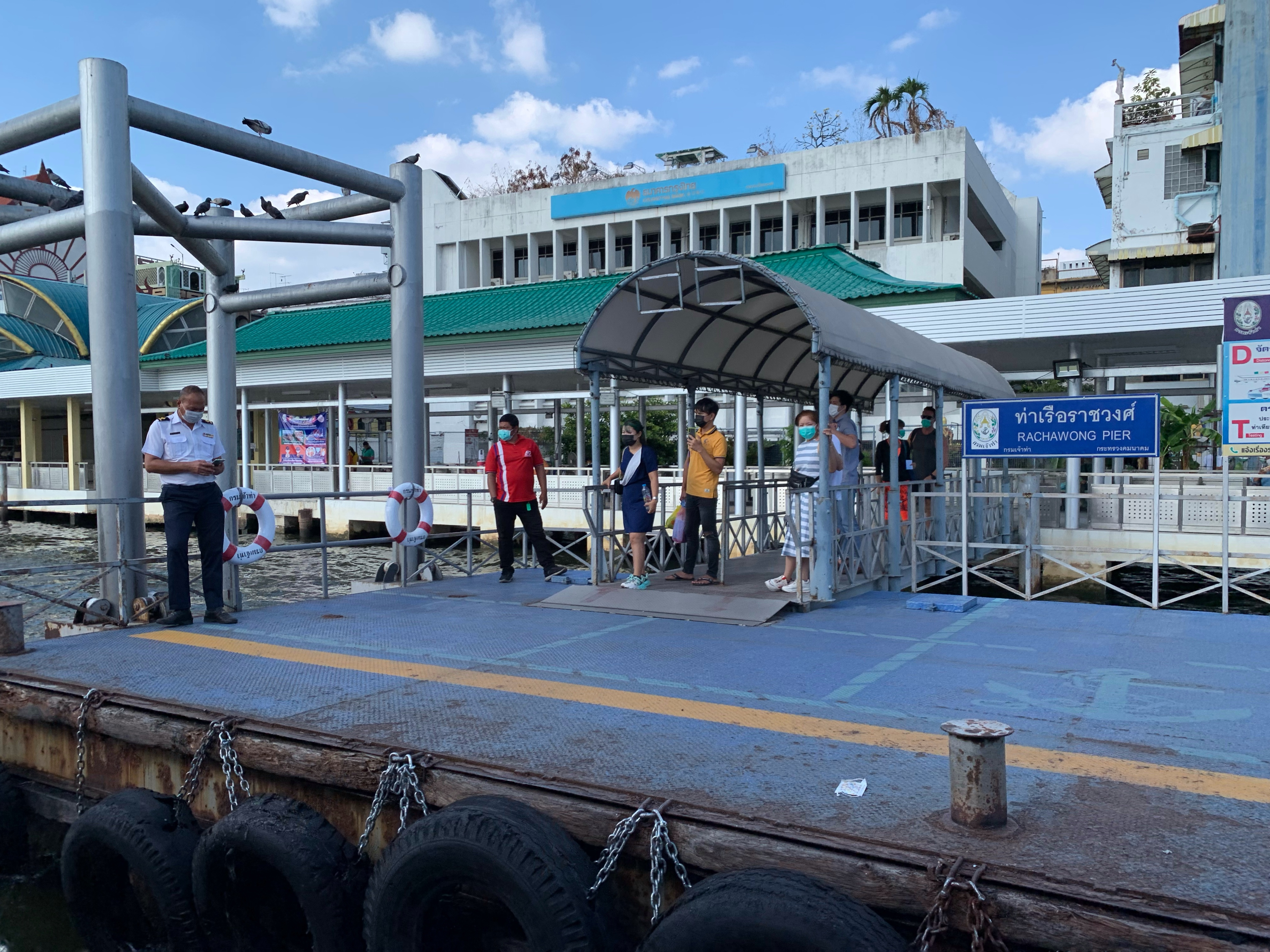
- Ratchawong Pier (N5) from the Chao Phraya in 2022

General information
- Other names: Rachawongse
- Location: Ratchawong Road, Chinatown; Bangkok; Thailand
- Operator: Chao Phraya Express Boat Co, Ltd
- Line: Chao Phraya River
- Platforms: 1
- Connections: Bus: 2-52 (204)

Construction
- Structure type: Pier

Other information
- Station code: N5

Passengers
- 2002: 25,000

Services
Preceding station	Chao Phraya Express Boat	Following station
Memorial Bridge towards Nonthaburi	Orange Line	Marine Dept towards Wat Rajsingkorn
Prannok towards Nonthaburi	Yellow Line	Marine Dept towards Sathorn
Tha Chang towards Pakkret	Green Line	Marine Dept towards Sathorn
Location

Ratchawong Pier (Thai: ท่าราชวงศ์, ท่าน้ำราชวงศ์, ท่าเรือราชวงศ์; designated pier code N5) is a pier on the Chao Phraya River in Bangkok.

== History ==
Ratchawong Pier located at the end of Ratchawong Road in the area of Chinatown close to historic and shopping districts, Sampheng and Song Wat Road. The pier was the port where goods were embarking to the cargo ships anchored middle the Chao Phraya River. These ships were the main means of transport, both passengers and cargoes, links Bangkok to Chonburi, Chanthaburi, Prachuap Khiri Khan, Chumphon, and Ban Don (Surat Thani).

At its heyday, there was a direct tram route to the pier. Around 11:00 p.m. or midnight during Chinese New Year, the pier also supported large crowds of passengers taking ferries to pay homage to Sampokong, the large Buddha statue at Wat Kanlayanamit on the Thonburi side.

Presently, the pier is one of the main ports for passenger ferries crossing Chao Phraya River to Tha Din Daeng, another Bangkok's Chinatown. The private company owns the ferry or passenger ship business. Based on 2002 data, about 25,000 people use this pier per day.

In addition, in the post-World War II (1950s), the area around pier was considered a venue for young people similar to Siam Square at present. It was a centre of many famous and tasty restaurants.

== Transportation ==
- Chao Phraya Express Boat: all boat routes
- BMTA bus: route 2-52 (204) (terminal)
- ICONSIAM: free shuttle boat
