= Phran Nok Road =

Street in Bangkok Noi District, Thailand

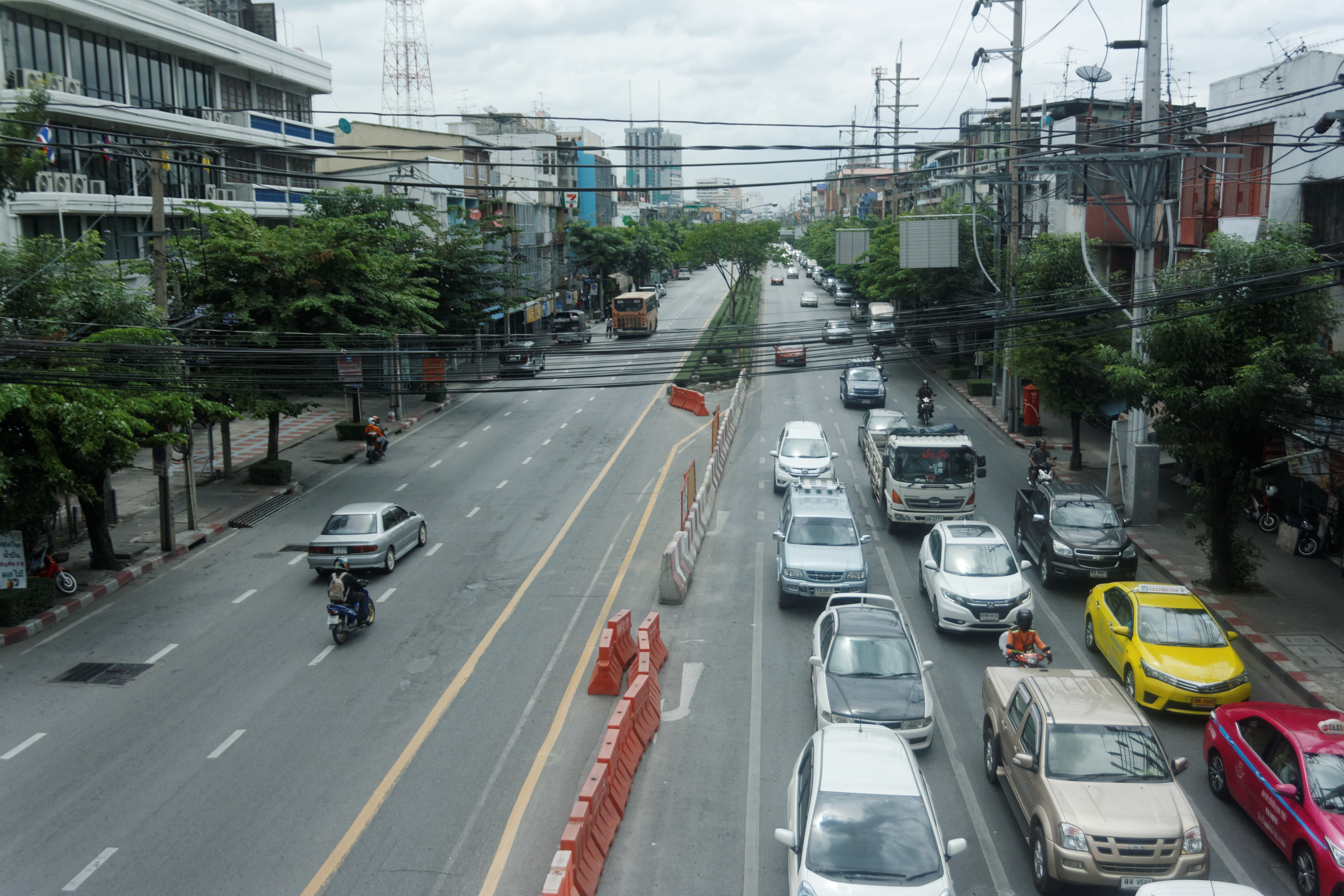
- Aerial view of Pran Nok Road in 2018 (as seen from Fai Chai Intersection towards Siriraj Hospital).
- Interactive map of Phran Nok Road
- Native name: ถนนพรานนก
- Namesake: Ban Phran Nok, Phra Nakhon Si Ayutthaya Province
- Length: 950 and 900 m (3,120 and 2,950 ft)
- Location: Bangkok Noi, Bangkok, Thailand
- Coordinates: 13°45′19″N 100°28′29″E
- East end: Prannok Pier, Chao Phraya River
- West end: Fai Chai Intersection, Charan Sanitwong Road

Phran Nok, also spelled Pran Nok or Prannok (Thai: พรานนก, pronounced [pʰrāːn nók]) is a name of the street in Ban Chang Lo and Siri Rat Subdistricts, Bangkok Noi District, Bangkok's Thonburi side. The name is also the surrounding area.

== History and route ==
Phran Nok Road is about two km (about one mi) long. It begins in front of the Prannok Pier on the bank of Chao Phraya River, runs a short distance passing Siriraj Hospital. This part was officially renamed Wang Lang Road (ถนนวังหลัง, [tʰā.nǒn wāŋ lǔaŋ]) in 2012 following a cabinet resolution to reflect its history, where the road passed was once a rear palace (Wang Lang) in the early Rattanakosin period. Then it continues running to meet Charan Sanitwong Road at Fai Chai Intersection. According to the policy of Field Marshal Plaek Phibunsongkhram, the late Prime Minister who wanted to name the roads in Thonburi Province following the name of the importance battling places where King Taksin the Great fought for Siam independent in order to commemorate and honour the King. Thereby, this road is named Phran Nok to follow the name of the first battlefield, Ban Phran Nok (currently in Uthai District, Phra Nakhon Si Ayutthaya Province), where Phraya Vajiraprakarn (his highest title before becoming the King) defeated the Burmese army on January 4, 1767 before the second fall of Ayutthaya in the same year.

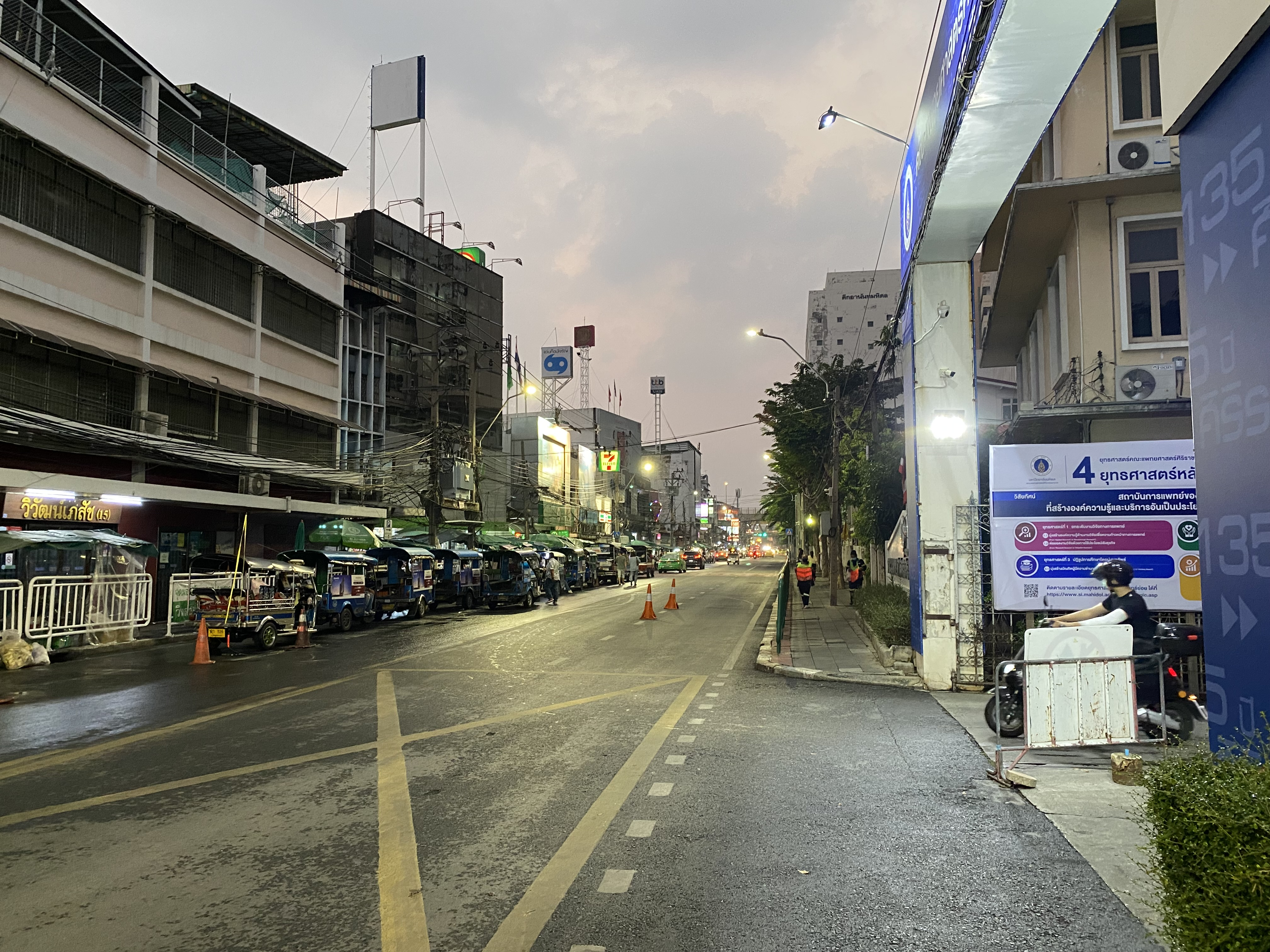
The beginning section known as Wang Lang Road (lit. 'rear palace road') in 2024 during the evening is flanked by Siriraj Hospital on the right and Wang Lang Market on the left.

Phran Nok Intersection, where Itsaraphap Road crosses and Wang Lang Road terminates, is well known as a hub of southern Thai restaurants, famous for their spicy dishes. Many of these well-established eateries line both sides of the road leading toward Wang Lang Market. This culinary presence reflects the area's history: the nearby Thonburi railway station was once the terminus of the Southern Line, and Fai Chai Intersection also hosted the former Southern Bus Terminal. As a result, the Phran Nok–Wang Lang neighbourhood has long been home to a significant southern Thai community.

Bangkok Noi is also the birthplace of Sunthorn Phu, the celebrated poet of the early Rattanakosin period. Reflecting this heritage, two sois (alleys) along Phran Nok Road are named after characters from his masterpiece Phra Aphai Mani: Soi Phran Nok 7 (Soi Sudsakorn) and Soi Phran Nok 9 (Soi Sin Samudra). At the intersection stands a statue of Sudsakorn riding Maninmangkorn, a mythical hybrid creature resembling a horse–dragon, similar in concept to the Chinese qilin.

== See more ==
- Wang Lang Market
- List of neighbourhoods in Bangkok
