= Tha Chang, Bangkok =

Pier on Chao Phraya River

Tha Chang ท่าช้าง
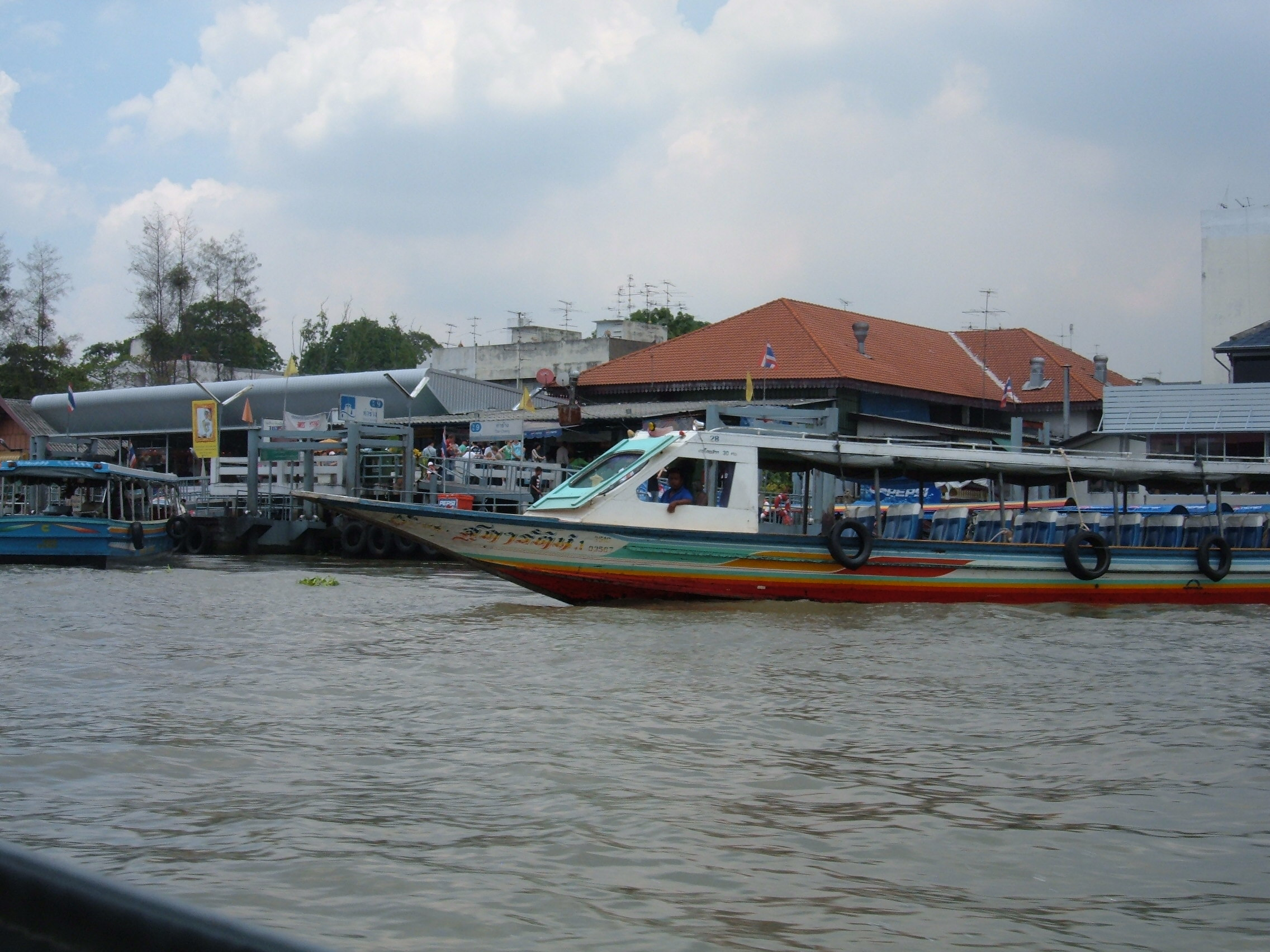
- Tha Chang in 2007

General information
- Other names: Tha Chang Wang Luang
- Location: Phra Borom Maha Ratchawang subdistrict, Phra Nakhon district Bangkok; Thailand
- Owner: Marine Department
- Operator: Chao Phraya Express Boat Co, Ltd
- Line: Chao Phraya River
- Platforms: 1

Construction
- Structure type: Pier

Other information
- Station code: N9

Services
Preceding station	Chao Phraya Express Boat	Following station
Prannok towards Nonthaburi	Orange Line	Tha Tien towards Wat Rajsingkorn
Prannok towards Pakkret	Green Line	Ratchawong towards Sathorn
Location

Tha Chang (Thai: ท่าช้าง, pronounced [tʰâː t͡ɕʰáːŋ]), or Tha Chang Wang Luang (ท่าช้างวังหลวง, [tʰâː t͡ɕʰáːŋ wāŋ lǔaŋ]), with designated pier code N9, is a pier on the Chao Phraya River at the end of Na Phra Lan Road in the area behind the Grand Palace next to Nagaraphirom Park and Ratchaworadit Pier.

== Description ==
Its name meaning Elephant Pier (Tha is jetty, pier and Chang is elephant), it was built in the reign of King Phutthayotfa Chulalok (Rama I), who was the first monarch of the Chakri Dynasty and the founder of the Rattanakosin Kingdom. At that time, elephants from the Grand Palace were brought to this area to take a bath, so it was called Tha Chang in Thai.

It was also known as Tha Phra (Thai: ท่าพระ, pronounced [tʰâː pʰráʔ], "Pier for Buddha") in those days because it was the point where a large Buddha image named Phra Sri Sakyamuni was brought from a raft to be enshrined in the inner city (now called Rattanakosin Island). Phra Sri Sakyamuni is now the principal Buddha image of Wat Suthat.

At present, Tha Chang is a pier that hosts the Chao Phraya Express Boat that runs between Bangkok and the north ends in Nonthaburi Province, including a ferry pier that crosses to Thonburi side at the Wat Rakhang in Bangkok Noi District and Tha Wang Lang in the area of Siriraj Hospital as well. In addition, it also has a number of retail shops and eateries. At the corner of the Tha Chang area, there are old shophouses built during King Chulalongkorn's (Rama V) reign with a beautiful plaster pediment, pilasters, and stucco. The buildings have all been registered as archaeological sites by the Fine Arts Department since 2001 and have been renovated and maintained at present.

== Another Tha Chang ==
There is another Tha Chang, Tha Chang Wang Na (Thai: ท่าช้างวังหน้า, [tʰâː t͡ɕʰáːŋ wāŋ nā]). It was formerly a royal pier and then a ferry port, taking passengers to Bangkok Noi railway station and other places along the canal Khlong Bangkok Noi. The area was once located back gate of the Wang Na (Front Palace). There was a royal elephant kraal nearby. The pier where royal elephants were brought for bathing known as Tha Chang Wang Na (The Front Palace's Elephant Pier). In King Rama IV's reign, Prince Pinklao (second king resided at front palace) preferred his courtiers to park their barges at the pier near his residence. He ordered the demolition of part of the city wall and its replacement by a gate for the royal elephant passing by. The pier has been called Tha Chang since then. The former elephant pier was later renamed as Tha Khun Nang Wang Na (ท่าขุนนางวังหน้า, "The Front Palace's Courtier Pier"). 13°45′39.5″N 100°29′29.2″E

For the present, Tha Chang Wang Na has long lost its status as a pier. It is located under the Phra Pin Klao Bridge on the beginning of Phra Athit Road next to Bangkok Tourism Division. Moreover, its vicinity is the location of Phra Arthit Mansion, unofficially known as Tham Niab Tha Chang (ทำเนียบท่าช้าง, "Tha Chang House"), it was the residence of senior statesman Pridi Banomyong during his regent tenure in the World War II period.
