= Siri Rat subdistrict =

Coordinates: 13°45′29.3″N 100°29′00.9″E

Siri Rat ศิริราช
- Khwaeng
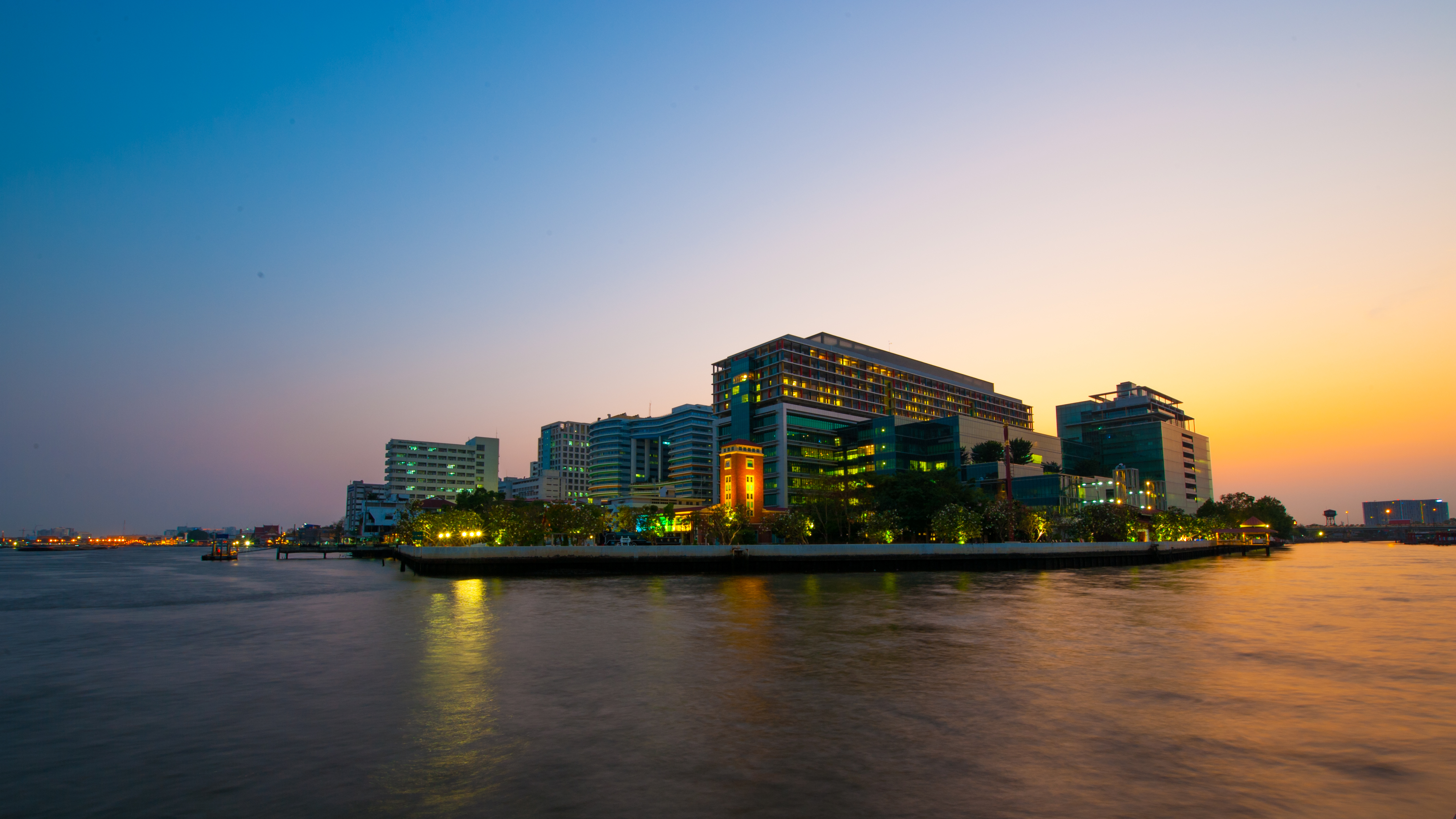
- Siriraj hospital

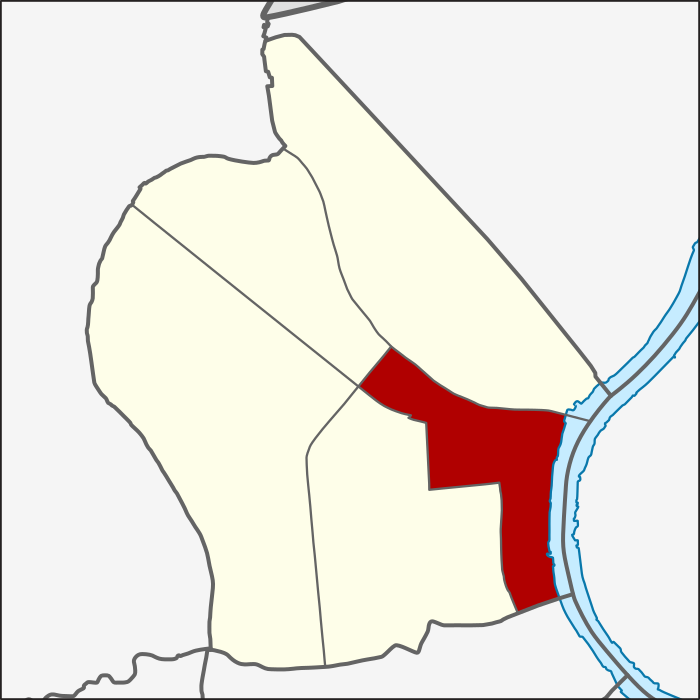
- Location in Bangkok Noi District
- Country: Thailand
- Province: Bangkok
- Khet: Bangkok Noi

Area
  - Total: 1.258 km^{2} (0.486 sq mi)

Population (2020)
  - Total: 13,458
- Time zone: UTC+7 (ICT)
- Postal code: 10700
- TIS 1099: 102004

Siri Rat (also spelled Siriraj, Thai: ศิริราช) is one of the 180 sub-districts (khwaeng) of Bangkok, Thailand, covering the area around Siriraj Hospital, located on the southern rim of Khlong (canal) Bangkok Noi mouth to the western bank of the Chao Phraya River in Bangkok Noi District. It is also named for the road intersection of Thanon (Road) Arun Ammarin and Thanon Wang Lang at the front of the hospital.

== Attractions ==
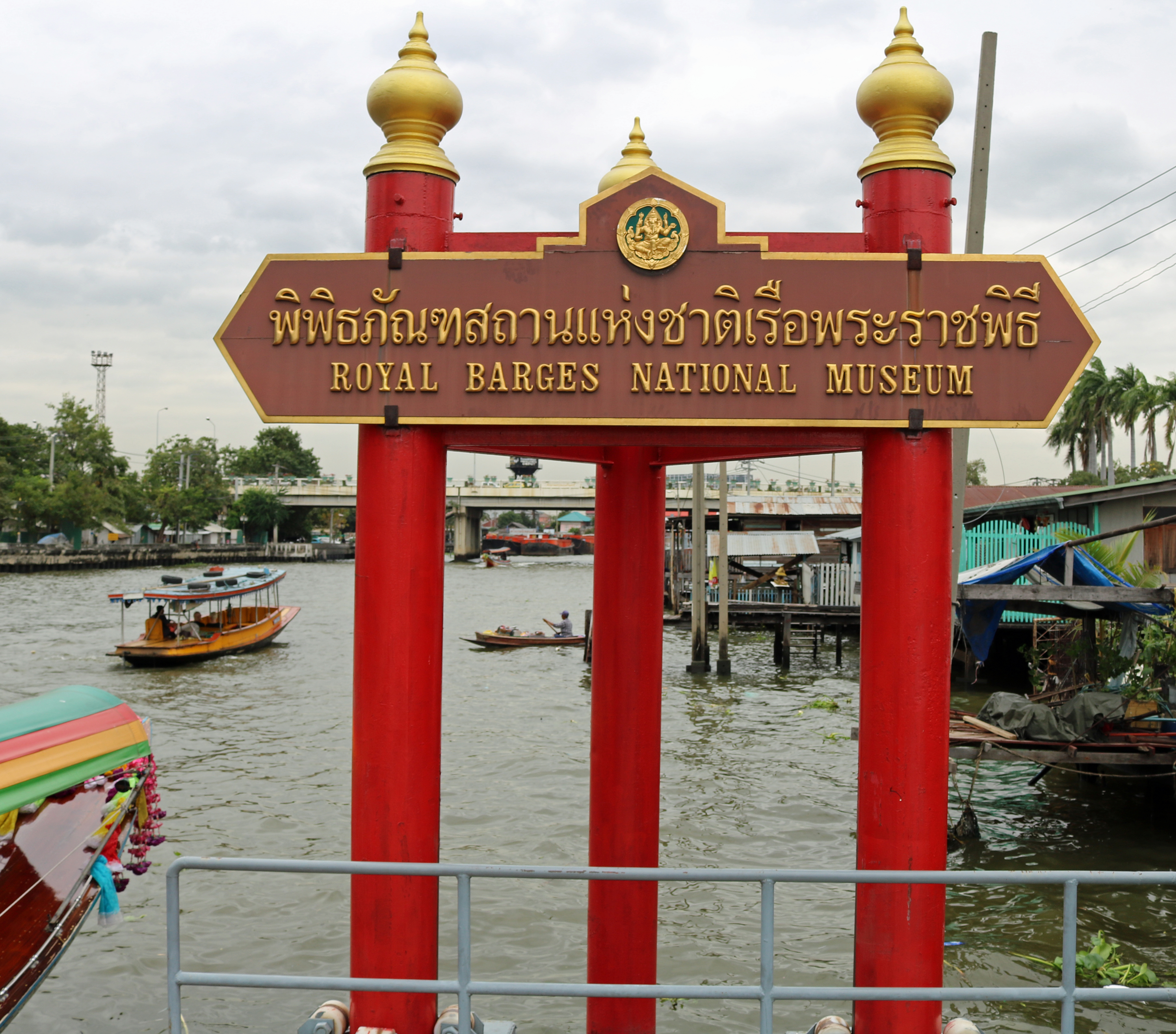
Sigh of National Museum of Royal Barges by the Khlong Bangkok Noi

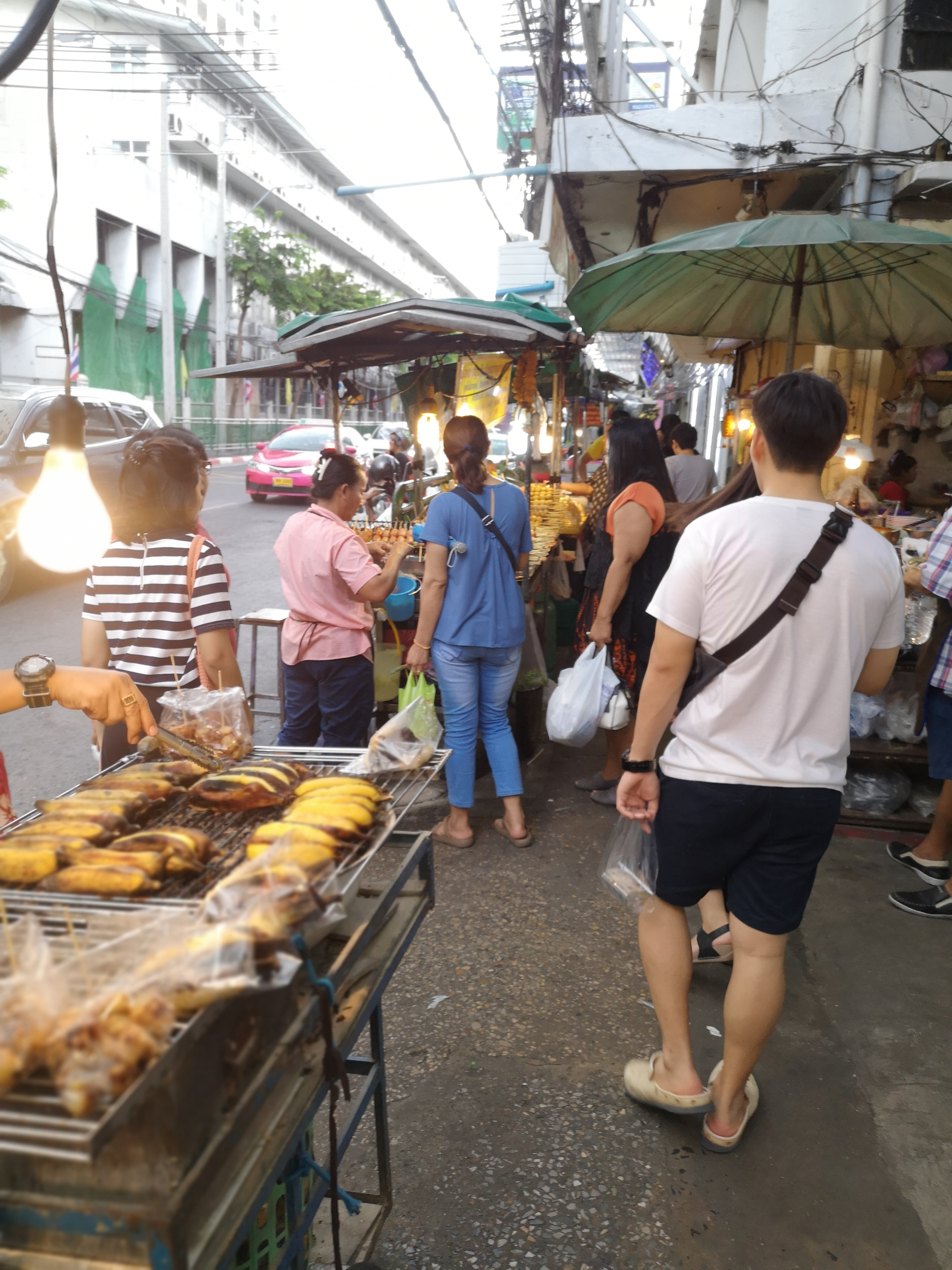
The atmosphere of street food stalls along Wang Lang Road, part of Wang Lang Market near Siriraj Hospital and Wang Lang Pier

The area is also included into Rattanakosin Island historical area as it used to be Thon Buri downtown (formerly capital of Thailand around 1768-1782). The major features in Siri Rat are the Faculty of Medicine Siriraj Hospital, Mahidol University, the oldest government hospital and the largest medical institution of Thailand, Wang Lang ladies market and Wat Rakhang, Temple of the Bell, the major temple with many exquisite fine arts. Outside the area just the northern rim of Khlong Bangkok Noi, there is also the National Museum of Royal Barge, where 8 important barges are preserved and displayed.

== Transportation ==
=== Boat ===
Wang Lang or Siri Rat Pier is the main pier for the area, consists of the ferry crossing-river boat service to Tha Chang and Tha Phra Chan piers to the Grand Palace, Wat Phra Kaew and Sanam Luang; and the Chao Phraya Express Boat Service to northern suburb at Nonthaburi or Bangkok downtown at Si Lom and Sathon. Nearby there is also another Rotfai (Railway) Pier at the former Thon Buri Railway Station for the Chao Phraya Express Boat.

=== Bus ===
There are several bus, public tuk-tuk or songthaew (public passenger pick-up vehicles) services to Taling Chan, Bangkok Yai, Charan Sanit Wong Road and Pinklao neighbourhood, and also the river-crossing bus lines through Phra Pinklao Bridge to Sanam Luang and Ratchadamnoen Road at another river side.

=== Railway ===
There is also Bangkok Noi Railway Station (or the former Thon Buri railway station), which used to be the southern railway terminal, and became the terminal station of the Death Railway to Kanchanaburi built by Japan during World War II.

=== Main roads ===
- Wang Lang Road
- Arun Ammarin Road
- Rotfai Road

== Electoral Constituency Delimitation ==
Unlike other areas of Bangkok Noi, in the general elections of 2023 and 2026, Siri Rat was included in constituency 32 (while the other sub-districts of Bangkok Noi were in constituency 33) out of the 33 constituencies of Bangkok. Constituency 32 comprised Siri Rat; Bangkok Yai; Hiran Ruchi, Bang Yi Ruea, and Wat Kanlaya sub-districts of Thon Buri; Pak Khlong Phasi Charoen, Bang Waek, Bang Chak, and Khuha Sawan sub-districts of Phasi Charoen; and Bang Chueak Nang sub-district of Taling Chan.

The winning parties were the Move Forward Party and the People's Party, respectively.

== See also ==
- Bangkok Noi District
- Siriraj Hospital
