= Bangkok Noi district =

Bangkok Noi บางกอกน้อย
- Khet
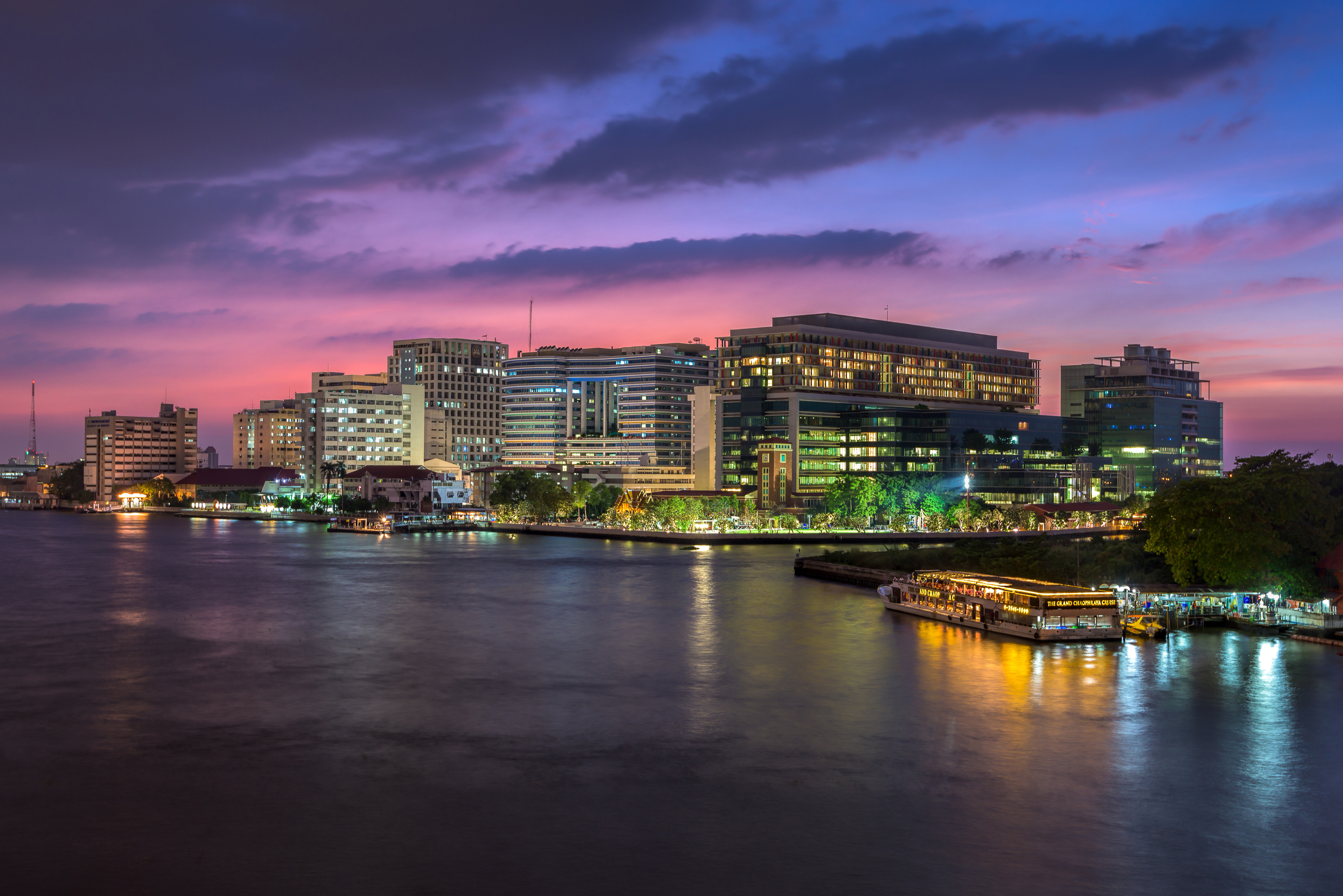
- Siriraj Hospital as seen from Phra Pin-klao Bridge

- Khet location in Bangkok
- Coordinates: 13°46′15.12″N 100°28′04.56″E
- Country: Thailand
- Province: Bangkok
- Seat: Bang Khun Non
- Khwaeng: 5

Area
  - Total: 11.944 km^{2} (4.612 sq mi)

Population (2017)
  - Total: 112,046
  - Density: 9,380.94/km^{2} (24,296.5/sq mi)
- Time zone: UTC+7 (THA)
- Postal code: 10700
- Geocode: 1020

Bangkok Noi (Thai: บางกอกน้อย, pronounced [bāːŋ.kɔ̀ːk nɔ́ːj]) is one of the 50 districts (khet) of Bangkok, Thailand. Neighboring districts are (from north clockwise) Bang Phlat, Phra Nakhon (across Chao Phraya River), Bangkok Yai, Phasi Charoen, and Taling Chan.

== History ==
Bangkok Noi was established as an amphoe on 15 October 1915. Originally named Amphoe Ammarin, it was renamed on 11 July 1916 to Amphoe Bangkok Noi to match with the historical name of the area. It became a khet in 1972 when Thon Buri and Bangkok were merged. Later on 9 November 1989 the Bang Phlat district was created from four of Bangkok Noi's sub-districts, leaving Bangkok Noi with four remaining sub-districts: Siri Rat, Ban Chang Lo, Bang Khun Non, and Bang Khun Si. On 12 December 1991 a small part of Bang Phlat district was moved back to Bangkok Noi, creating the new Arun Ammarin sub-district.

== Symbols ==
The district seals shows the head of the royal barge Sri Suphunahongsa. The slogan of the district is Resonant Wat Rakang, historical Wang Lang, Royal barges and railway are renowned.

== Administration ==
District map

The district is sub-divided into 5 sub-districts (khwaeng).

No.	Name	Thai	Area (km^{2})	Map
4.	Siri Rat	ศิริราช	1.258	Map
5.	Ban Chang Lo	บ้านช่างหล่อ	2.076	Map
6.	Bang Khun Non	บางขุนนนท์	1.492	Map
7.	Bang Khun Si	บางขุนศรี	4.360	Map
9.	Arun Amarin	อรุณอมรินทร์	2.758	Map
Total			11.944	Map

The missing number 1, 2, 3 and 8 belong to the sub-districts which were split off to form Bang Phlat district.

== Places ==
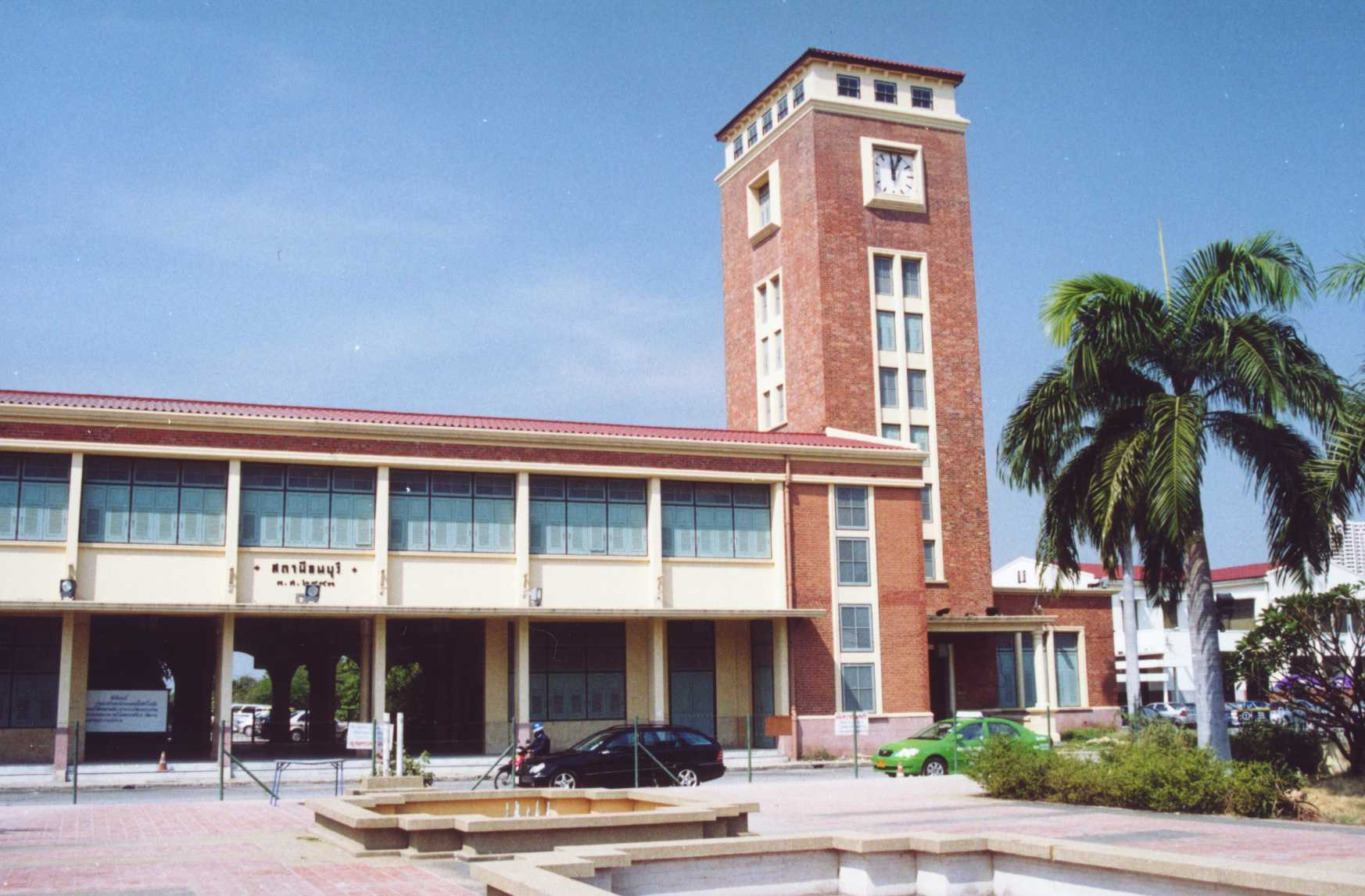
Thon Buri Railway Station

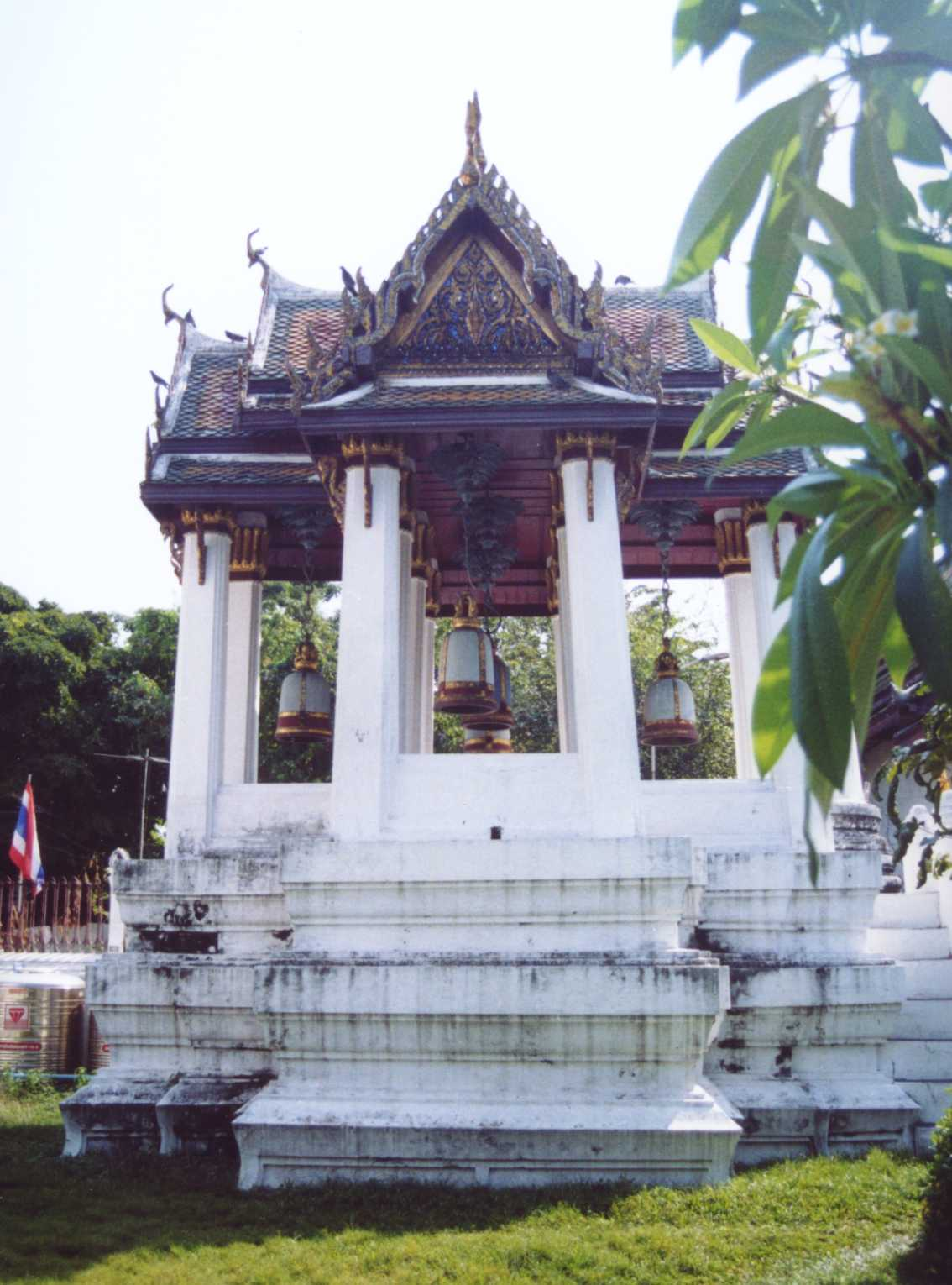
Bells of Wat Rakhang

The National Museum of Royal Barges on the northern rim of Khlong Bangkok Noi near its mouth to the Chao Phraya River houses the royal barges, used for Thailand's Royal Barge Processions on very special events, like 200th anniversary of Bangkok or the 60th anniversary of the accession of King Bhumibol Adulyadej.

On the other side of the khlong is the Siriraj Hospital, which was the first western hospital in Thailand. It was originally named Wang Lang hospital, as it was built on the site of a palace (Thai: Wang), it was later renamed after Prince Siriraj Kakuta Bhandu, the beloved son of King Rama V, who died of dysentery only 18 months old. The hospital also houses several exhibitions, like the forensic museum in the Siriraj Medical Museum.

Directly next to the hospital is the Bangkok Noi Railway Station (or the former Thon Buri Railway Station), which serves the trains to the west, especially to Kanchanaburi. It was built in 1900 in European style. During World War II the Japanese used it as their logistics base and thus the station was destroyed. It was rebuilt in same style after the war. In 2003 the railway station was moved one kilometer westwards and the old building is now unused. The cleared space is allocated for expansion of the Siriraj hospital, however currently only used as a parking lot.

Wat Suwannaram Ratchaworawihan, also located at the southern rim of the Khlong, was originally called Wat Thong and dates back to Ayutthaya times. King Rama I had the temple restored and renamed it to its present name. It was a royal cremation site in the early Bangkok period, however the cremation site was demolished and used to be the location of the Bangkok Noi district office. The temple is most famous due to the murals, which are considered the most artistic of that time. In the Suwannaram Witthayakhom School next to the temple is also the district museum.

Wat Rakhang Khositaram Woramaha Wihan is a major temple by the Chao Phraya river. It dates back to Ayutthaya times, when it was named Bangwayai. During the renovations done by King Rama I a huge bell was found and moved to Wat Phra Kaew, five smaller bells were installed in the temple as replacement. The bell also gave the temple its name, as Rakang is the Thai word for bell. In addition, in the same soi (alley) as Wat Rakhang, there used to be a place of Pataravadi Theatre, a theatre and school for performing arts and music both in Thai and Western styles. It was planted and run by actress and national artists Patravadi Mejudhon. It was also annexed with Patravadi Gallery, which was an open-aired gallery for exhibitions of visual arts. Artists can have their work displayed free of changed in the way they wish. The theatre was in operation from 1992 to 2014.

In the Soi Charan Sanit Wong 34 (Charan Sanit Wong 34 Alley) in the area of Arun Amarin, it is the location of Petchyindee Academy the famous and popular fitness club and Muay Thai institute.

== Economy ==
=== Traditional businesses ===
Bangkok Noi is known for several traditional goods and handicrafts, though most have disappeared.

- In Trok Matum opposite the Navy Dockyard bael fruits are boiled in syrup to make a special snack. The small side road (Trok) is named after the fruit, which is Matoom (มะตูม) in Thai. Today, it is officially known as Soi Arun Amarin 23.
- Nearby Trok Khao Mao (lit. lane of shredded rice) is famous for producing shredded rice. The paddy gets immersed until it is soft, then roasted in a pan. It then get crushed in a mortar and mixed with rain tree leaves to give it green color. Finally it is winnow to separate out the chaffs. Due to the labor-intensive procedure there are only few producers left today.
- Ban Chang Lo is a community renowned for its casting of Buddha images. Originally the bodies of the images were made from plaster and covered with black lacquer, until finally gold leaves are put on it. Nowadays the plaster has been replaced with rubber mold, and the lacquer with car paint, but the craftmanship of the community is still unchanged.
- Within the Ban Bu community were the only remaining producers of stone-polished bowls, an old technique dating back to Ayutthaya times. Such bowls ceased to be in daily use since the 1950s, thus the technique nearly disappeared. The bowls are now only collector's items or bought as souvenirs.
- A business inherited from the Muslim community of Ayutthaya are mattresses. However, as cotton-stuffed are no longer popular, such only few producers remain.

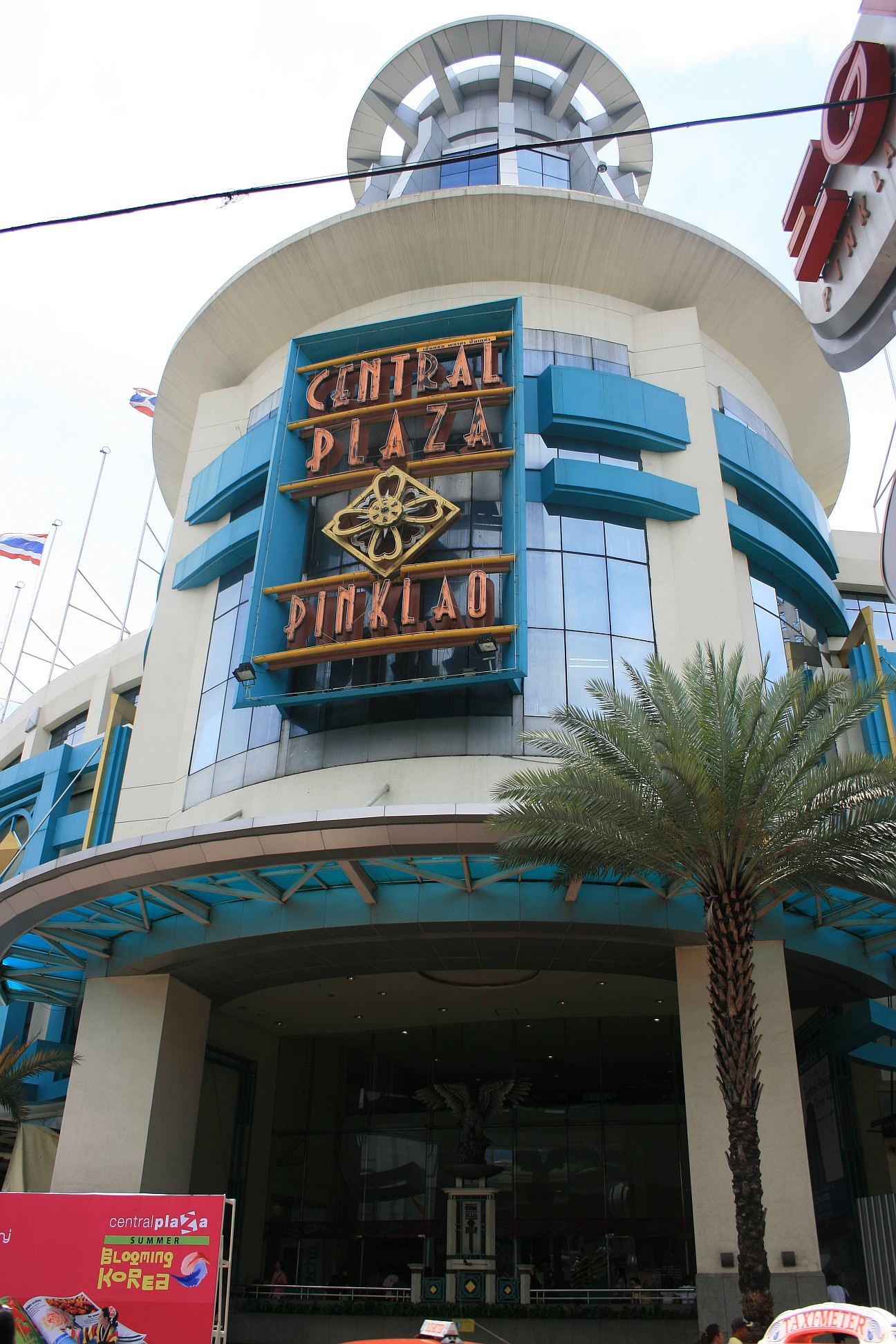
Central Pinklao shopping mall

=== Commerce ===
The only major shopping center is Central Plaza Pinklao with a Central Department Store on Borommaratchachonnani Road. Across the street from Central Pinklao is Major Cineplex. The multiplex cinema, which is actually in Bang Phlat District, is surrounded by many small shops selling low-cost clothes and other fashion items.

The striking markets of the district are Pran Nok Market, Bang Khun Si Market and Wang Lang Market, especially Wang Lang Market, a daily bustling market by Chao Phraya River flanked by Siriraj Hospital and Prannok Pier. The name means 'rear palace market' because of its close proximity to the Rear Palace, a palace belonging to the nephew of King Rama I which is no longer standing. Adjacent Wang Lang Pier is both pier to the Chao Phraya Express Boat and the ferry pier to Tha Phra Chan and Tha Chang in the Phra Nakhon side which is full of people and foreign tourists throughout the day.

Chaitit Market is the newest big indoor market located on Liap Thang Rotfai Taling Chan Road. The road parallel to the Southern Railway between the Charansanitwong railway and Bang Ramat railway halts.

== Transportation ==
Charan Sanit Wong Road is the main route of the area, it ran through the entire district from the south (Bangkok Yai) to the northern area (Bang Phlat). Borommaratchachonnani Road is another main road in the district, the road is also a route to neighboring districts, Taling Chan and Bang Phlat. While Arun Amarin and Itsaraphap with Phran Nok Roads considered as the minor road.

Since 2015, the expansion of Phran Nok–Phutthamonthon Sai 4 Road from Taling Chan to Fai Chai Intersection in Bangkok Noi making it easier to travel by road to this district.

The district is served by the Fai Chai and Bang Khun Non Stations of the MRT Metro, whose Blue Line runs above Charan Sanit Wong Road.

The piers of the Chao Phraya Express Boat consist of Prannok (N10) and Thonburi Railway Piers (N11) both are in the area of Siriraj Hospital.

== Popular culture ==
Moreover Bangkok Noi is also referred to in the masterpiece tragedy novel Thommayanti's Khu Kam (คู่กรรม) as the backdrop of the whole story, because it is the location of the Imperial Japanese Army base during World War II period. This novel has been adapted into TV drama, stage plays and movie many times, such as Sunset at Chaophraya in 1996 lead role by superstar Thongchai "Bird" McIntyre etc.

Khlong Bangkok Noi is the setting of a Thai country song, (luk thung), titled Bangkok Noi). It has been sung since 1960 by Chaichana Boonnachote.

== Politics ==
Bangkok Noi is regarded as one of the Democrat Party's strongest support bases on the Thonburi side of Bangkok. This has largely been attributed to the long-standing local influence of former Member of Parliament (MP) Ong-art Klampaiboon, who has represented the area since the 1990s. In the 2005 general election, while the Thai Rak Thai Party won the majority of constituencies across Bangkok, Bangkok Noi was one of only four constituencies in the capital won by the Democrat Party. In the 2011 general election, all 10 constituencies on the Thonburi side of Bangkok were won by Democrat Party candidates. Ong-art remains one of the party's leading figures in Bangkok.

In the 2026 Bangkok Metropolitan Council election, which was held concurrently with the Bangkok gubernatorial election, the seat was won by Napapon Chirakul of the Democrat Party. He has represented Bangkok Noi in the Bangkok Metropolitan Council (MC) since 1996, including this election, has been elected for a total of five terms, all under the Democrat Party banner.
