= Prannok Pier =

Pier number N10, is a pier on the Chao Phraya River

Coordinates: 13°45′21.7″N 100°29′13.3″E

Prannok Pier ท่าพรานนก
- Prannok Pier in late 2021

General information
- Other names: Siriraj Pier; Wang Lang Pier
- Location: Siri Rat subdistrict, Bangkok Noi district Bangkok; Thailand
- Line: Chao Phraya River
- Platforms: 1

Construction
- Structure type: Pier

Other information
- Station code: N10

Services
Preceding station	Chao Phraya Express Boat	Following station
Railway Station towards Nonthaburi	Orange Line	Tha Chang towards Wat Rajsingkorn
Railway Station towards Nonthaburi	Yellow Line	Ratchawong towards Sathorn
Railway Station towards Pakkret	Green Line	Tha Chang towards Sathorn
Location

Prannok Pier, also known as the Siriraj Pier or Wang Lang Pier (Thai: ท่าพรานนก, ท่าศิริราช, ท่าวังหลัง) with designated pier number N10, is a pier on the Chao Phraya River located at the Siriraj Subdistrict, Bangkok Noi district in the area adjacent Siriraj Hospital and Wang Lang Market.

== Description ==
Prannok Pier is a pier located at the far end of Wang Lang Road, stretching past Siriraj Hospital and Wang Lang Market. It lies roughly in the middle between Tha Chang Pier (N9) and Railway Station Pier (N11). The pier area is divided into two sections: Prannok, which serves the Chao Phraya Express Boat running between Bangkok and northern Nonthaburi Province, and Tha Wang Lang or Wang Lang Pier, a ferry pier providing access to important locations on the Phra Nakhon side, such as Tha Prachan, Thammasat University (TU), Sanam Luang, the Grand Palace, Wat Phra Kaew, and Wat Pho.

In the morning rush hour of June 14, 1995, a tragic accident occurred at the pier when the pontoon collapsed under the weight of passengers, resulting in 29 deaths, many of whom were young students.

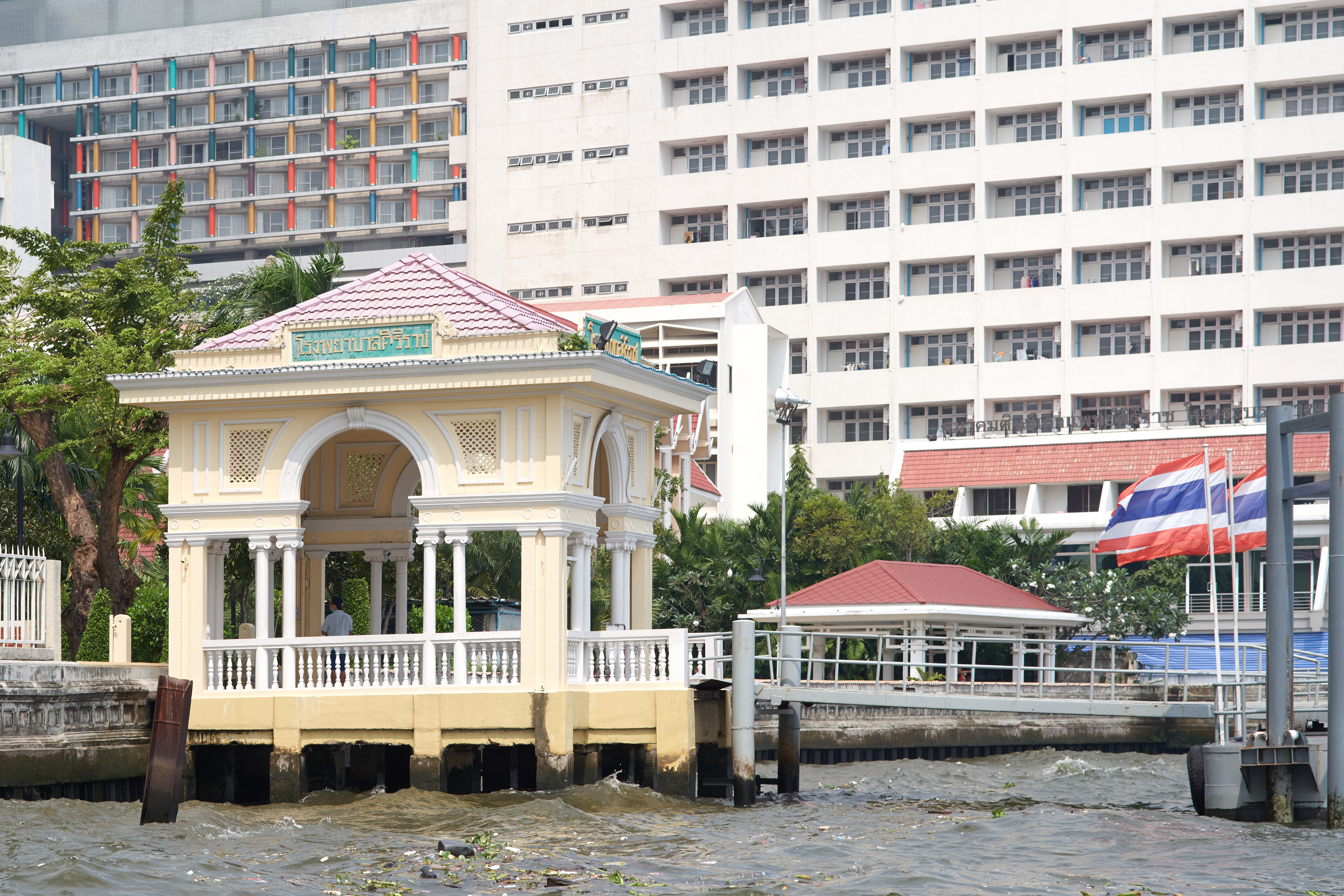
Siriraj Hospital Pier, located nearby, features beautiful architecture but is usually not open for boats to dock
