= Nagaraphirom Park =

Park in Thailand

Coordinates: 13°44′49″N 100°29′25″E

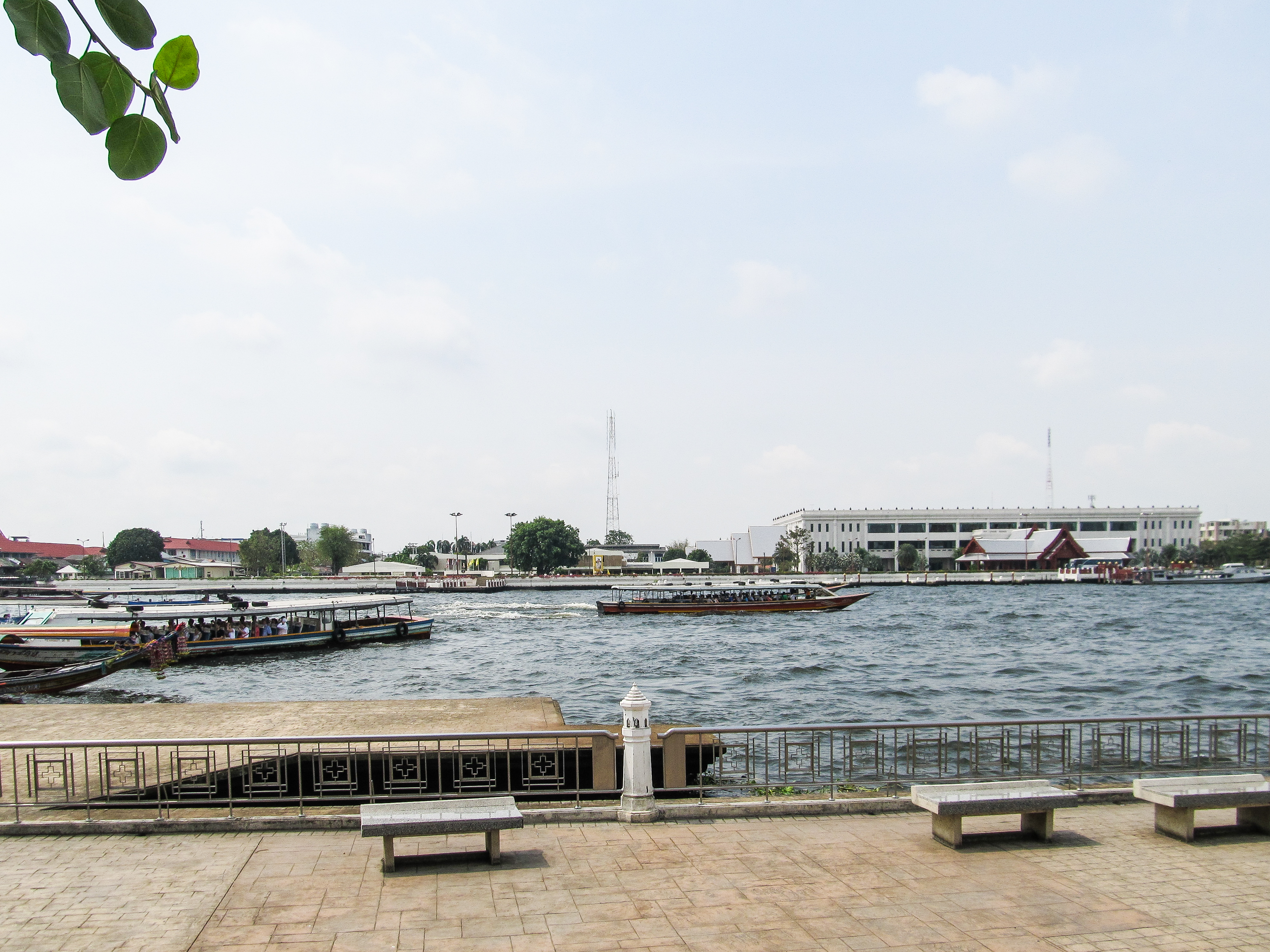
Nagaraphirom Park

Nagaraphirom Park (Thai: สวนนาคราภิรมย์) was a small public park of about 3 rai (0.48 ha; 1.2 acres) on the Chao Phraya River in Bangkok. Located on Maharat Road, Phra Borom Maha Ratchawang Subdistrict, Phra Nakhon District behind the Grand Palace between Tha Tian (N8) and Tha Chang Wang Luang Pier (N9).

On June 26, 2009 King Bhumibol Adulyadej (Rama IX) named the park "Nagaraphirom", meaning "delightful park for the townspeople".

Nagaraphirom Park officially opened in December 2010. The park was open daily from 05:00 a.m. to 09:00 p.m.

In 2016 the park was razed to build an underground parking garage. It was announced that construction would take two years, but the garage was never built. The park's former location is now a parking lot.
