= Railway Station Pier =

Pier code N11 is a pier for Chao Phraya Express Boat

Coordinates: 13°45′33.66″N 100°29′14.86″E

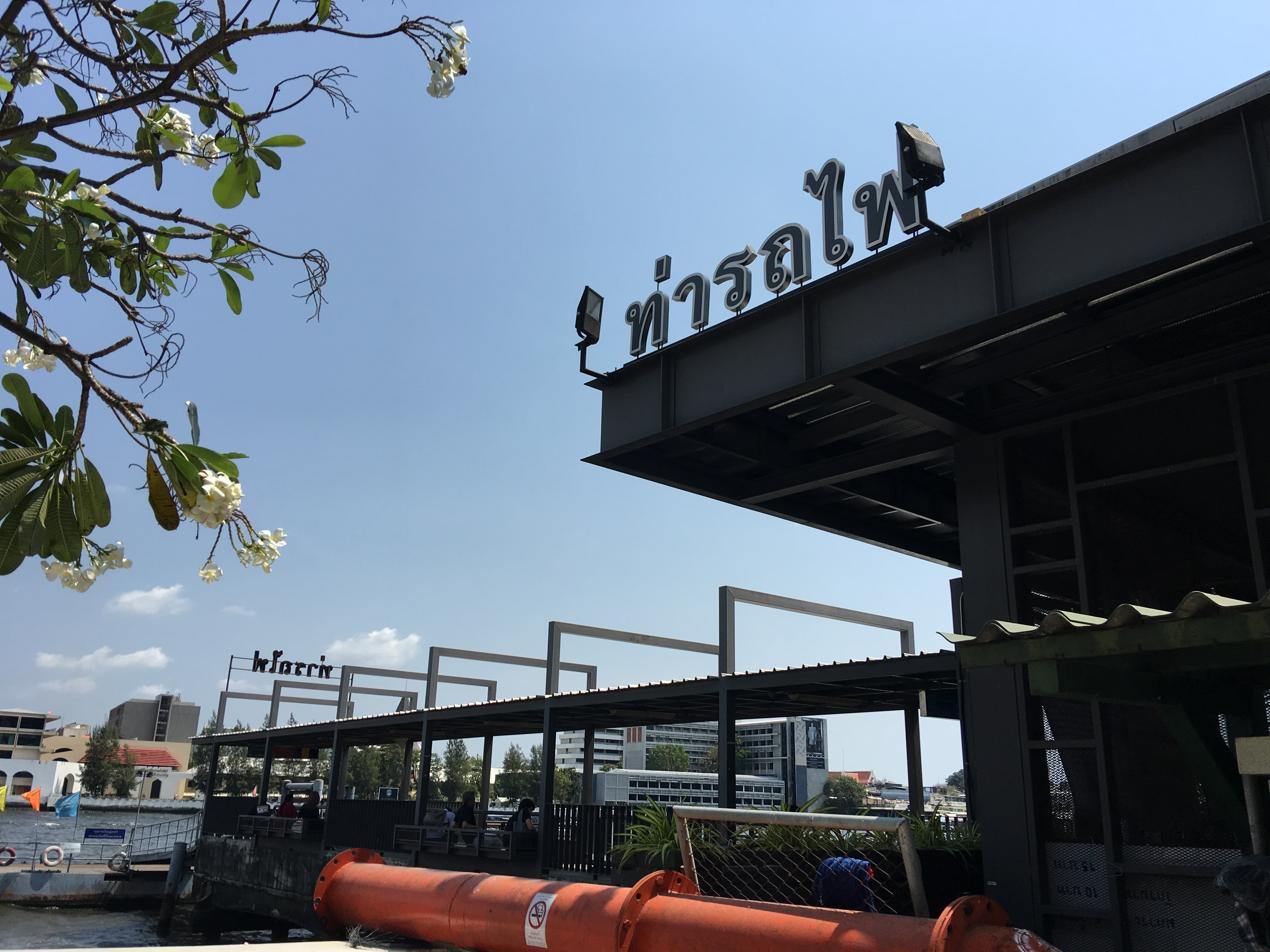
Railway Station Pier in 2017

Railway Station Pier or Thonburi Railway Station Pier (Thai: ท่ารถไฟ, pronounced [tʰâː rót.fāj]), with designated pier code N11 is a pier for Chao Phraya Express Boat, that runs between Bangkok (Wat Rajsingkorn next to Asiatique; S3) and the north ends in Nonthaburi Province (Pakkret; N33).

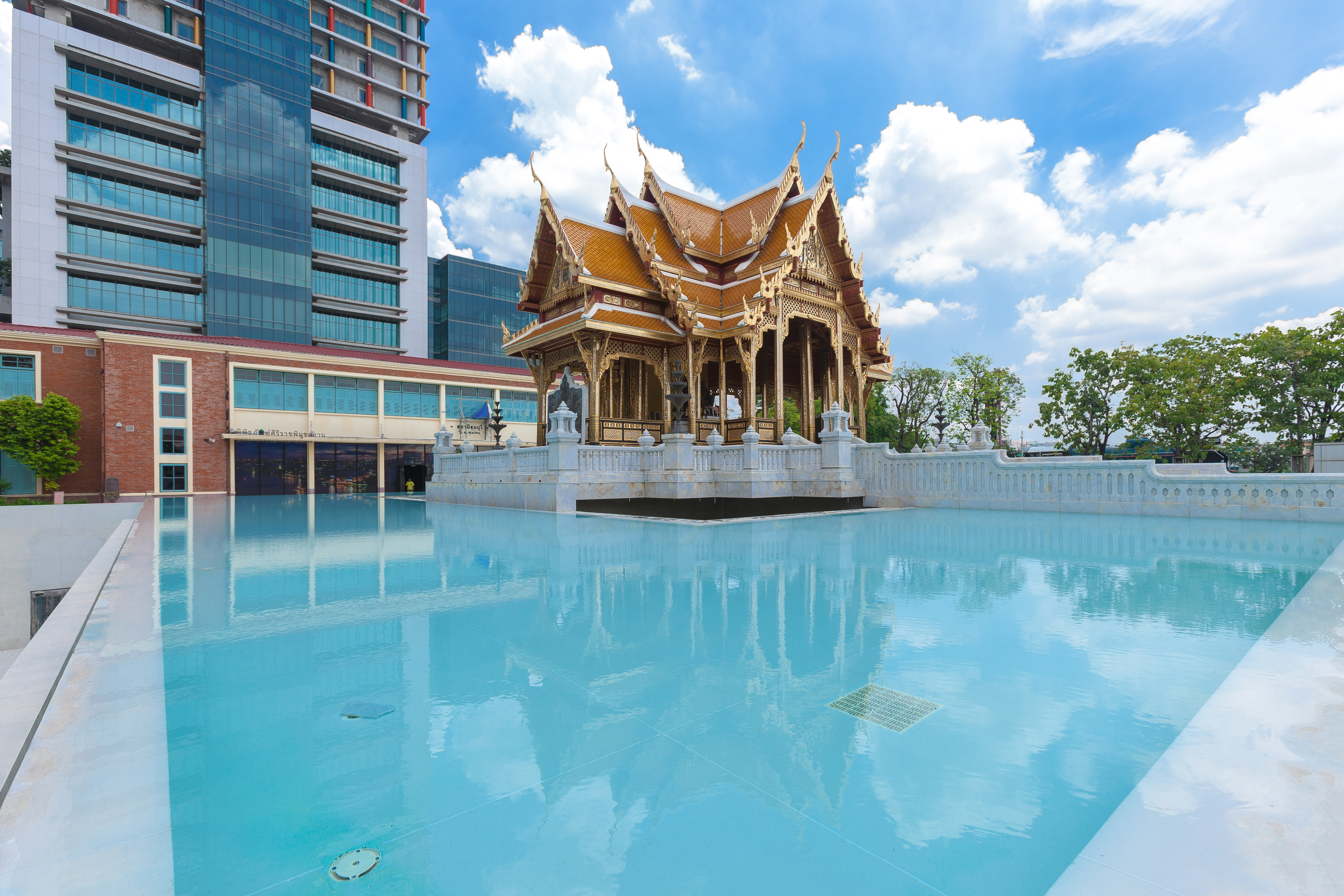
Chaloem Phrakiat 72nd Year Park next to Siriraj Museum, also known as Siriraj Bimuksthan Museum

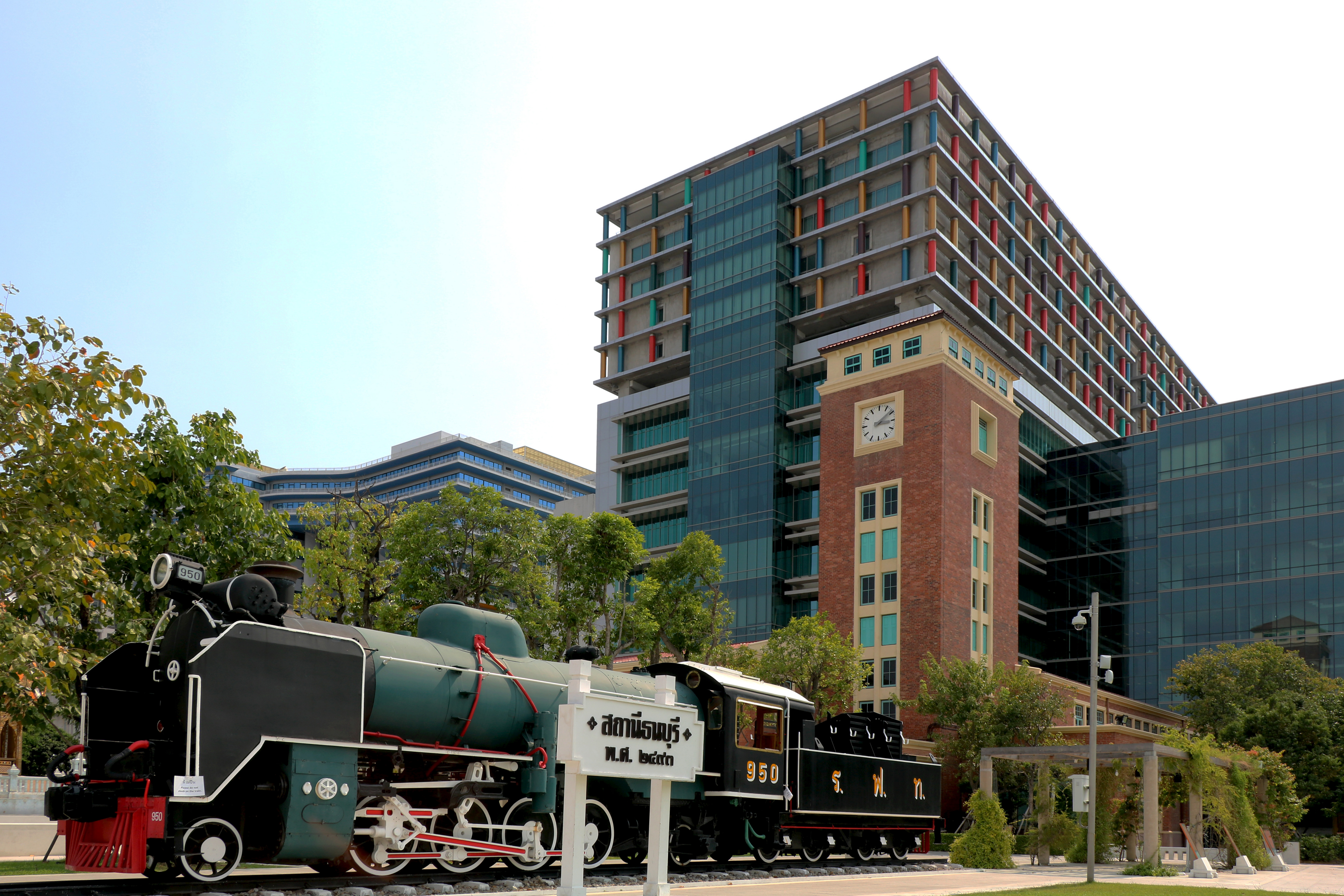
Old steam locomotive and buildings of Siriraj Museum and Siriraj Piyamaharajkarun Hospital

== Location ==
Railway Station Pier is located between Prannok Pier (N10) and Phra Pin Klao Bridge Pier (N12), in front of Siriraj Piyamaharajkarun Hospital (SiPH) along the Chao Phraya River near the mouth of Bangkok Noi Canal. It occupies the former site of Bangkok Noi railway station, hence its name "Railway Station Pier" or "Tha Rot Fai" in Thai.

From the pier, visitors can clearly see across the river the Dome Building, the Faculty of Political Science, and the Faculty of Economics of Thammasat University (TU). In the 1960s and 1970s, the pier also served as a ferry crossing for students traveling to the university.

Railway Station Pier is considered a pleasant riverside spot, suitable for tourists and leisurely walks. Nearby, within the Siriraj Piyamaharajkarun Hospital area, lies Chaloem Phrakiat 72nd Year Park with a beautiful Thai-style pavilion, along with old steam locomotive number 950 and the Siriraj Bimuksthan Museum.

In addition to water transport, the pier's entrance functions as a terminal for many songthaew (Thai-style minibuses) routes, connecting to locations in Taling Chan District such as Wat Champa Community and the Taling Chan and Khlong Lat Mayom Floating Markets.

In August 2018, the Marine Department temporarily suspended services at Railway Station Pier due to damage to one of the pontoon supports, requiring repairs before services could resume.

== See more ==
- Siriraj Piyamaharajkarun Hospital
- Bangkok Noi railway station
