= Vodhyakara Varavarn =

Mom Chao Vodhyakara Varavarn (Note: Mom Chao is a Thai princely title, styled in English as His Serene Highness.) (Thai: หม่อมเจ้าโวฒยากร วรวรรณ, RTGS: Wothayakon Worawan; 1900–1981) was a Thai prince and architect. He was among the first Thai architects to be educated in Europe, graduating from the University of Cambridge, and was an influential figure in the formation of the modern fields of architecture and architecture education in Thailand. He produced works both for the government and privately during the pre- and post-World War II periods, and served as Dean of the Faculty of Architecture at Chulalongkorn University from 1954 to 1964.
