= Bang Khun Si subdistrict =

Bang Khun Si แขวงบางขุนศรี
- Khwaeng
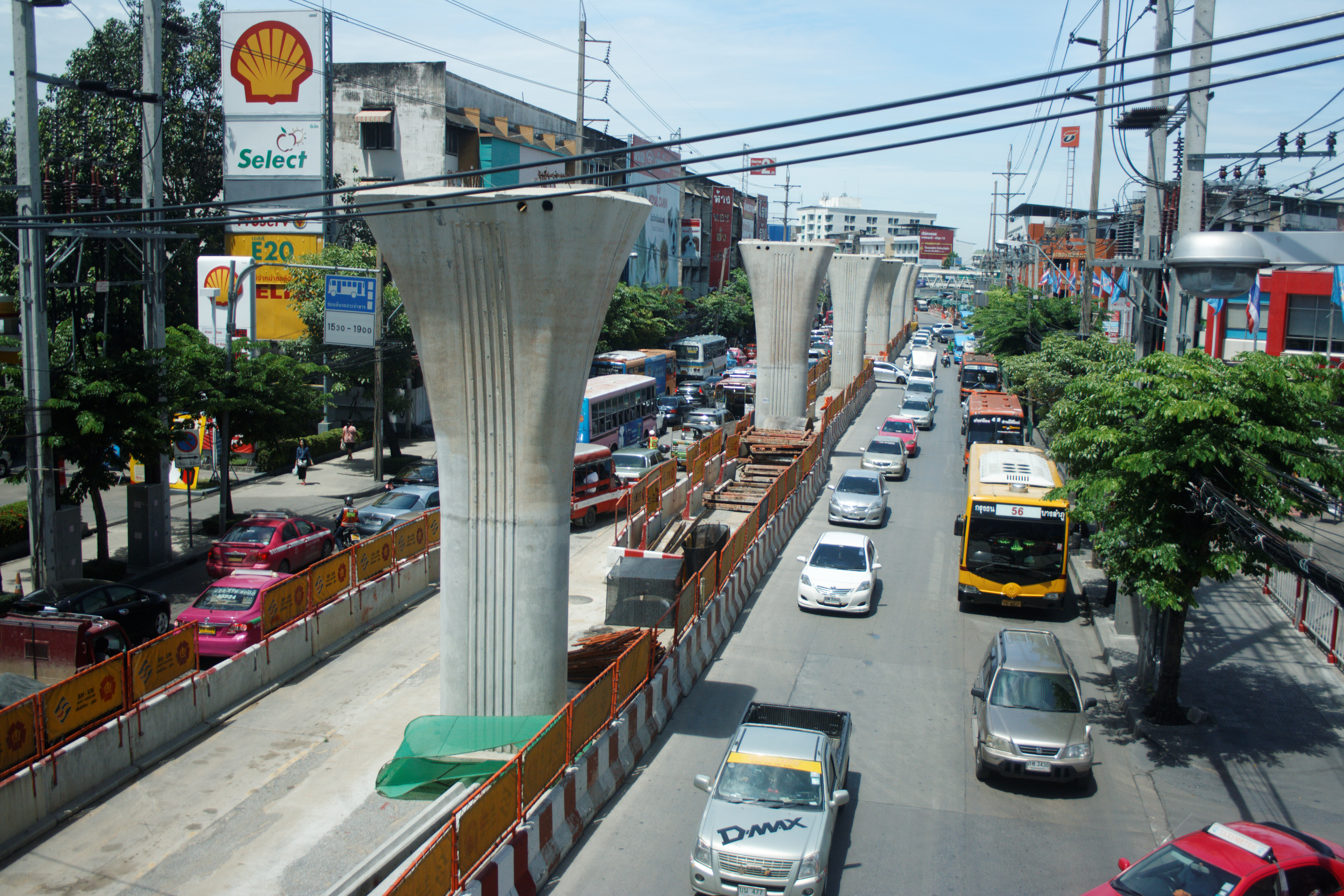
- Bang Khun Si during construction of MRT Blue Line elevated subway front of Makro Charan Sanit Wong on Charan Sanit Wong Road (opposite side is Ban Chang Lo)

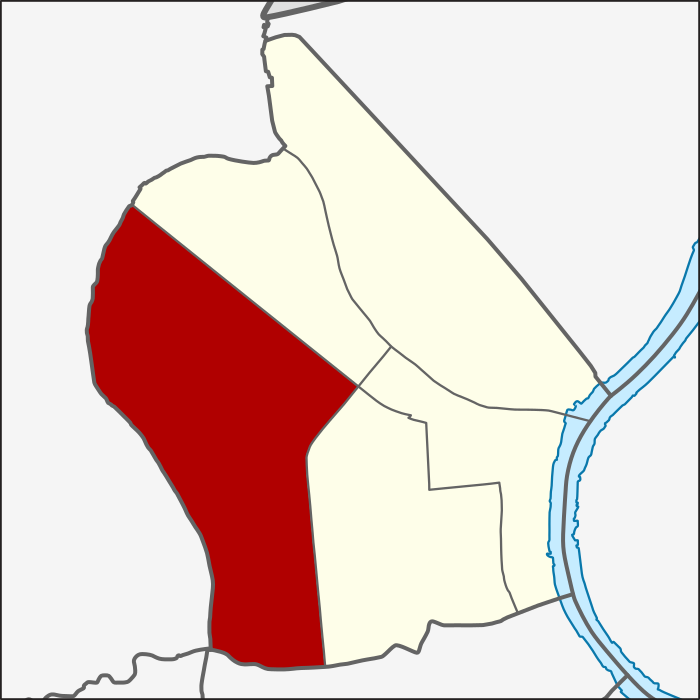
- Location in Bangkok Noi District
- Country: Thailand
- Province: Bangkok
- Khet: Bangkok Noi

Area
  - Total: 4.360 km^{2} (1.683 sq mi)

Population (2019)
  - Total: 31,689
- Time zone: UTC+7 (ICT)
- Postal code: 10700
- TIS 1099: 102007

Bang Khun Si (Thai: บางขุนศรี, pronounced [bāːŋ kʰǔn sǐː]) is a khwaeng (subdistrict) of Bangkok Noi District, in Bangkok, Thailand. In 2019, it had a total population of 31,689 people.

== Naming ==
The name is derived from a canal that runs through the west area, Khlong Bang Khun Si, also known as Khlong Chak Phra.

== Geography ==
Bang Khun Si covers the central-southwest area of Bangkok Noi, with a total area of 4.360 km^{2} (1.683 mi^{2}), regarded as the largest subdistrict of Bangkok Noi.

The area is bordered by neighbouring subdistricts (from north clockwise): Bang Khun Non in its district (Southern Railway Line is borderline), Siri Rat and Ban Chang Lo in its district (Charan Sanit Wong Road is a borderline), Wat Tha Phra in Bangkok Yai District (Khlong Mon is a borderline), Khuha Sawan in Phasi Charoen District (Khlong Bang Chueak Nang is a borderline), Khlong Chak Phra in Taling Chan District (Khlong Chak Phra is a borderline), respectively.
