= Wang Lang Market =

Market in Bangkok, Thailand

Coordinates: 13°45′19.79″N 100°29′6.27″E

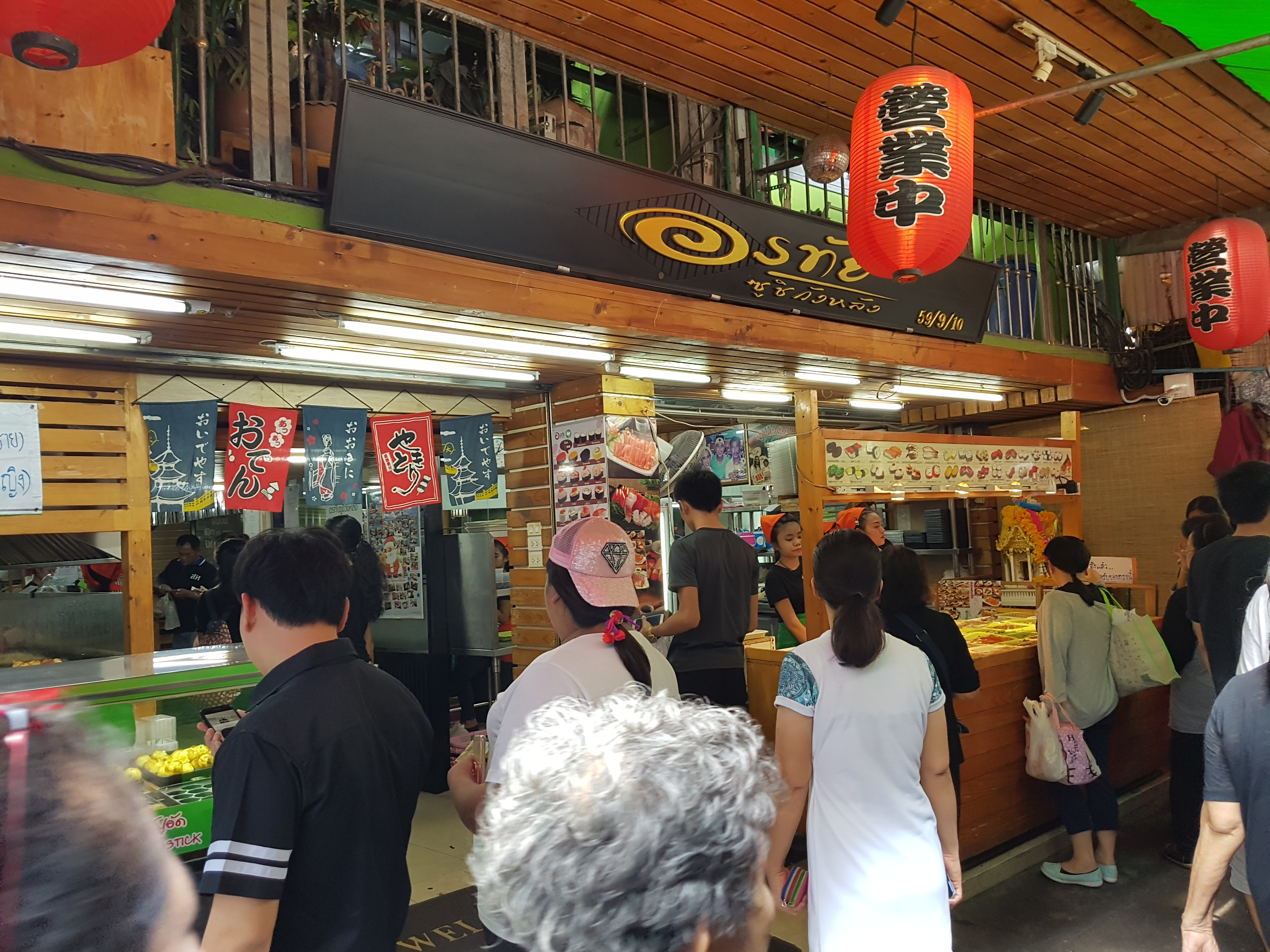
Sushi shop within the market

Wang Lang Market (Thai: ตลาดวังหลัง, RTGS: Talat Wang Lang, pronounced [tā.làːt wāŋ lǎŋ]) is a daily market in Bangkok Noi district next to the Chao Phraya river.

The name "Wang Lang" means rear palace. In the early Rattanakosin period in the reign of King Rama I, it was the site of the palace of Prince Anurak Devesh (พระราชวังบวรสถานพิมุข หรือ วังหลัง; Rajawang Boworn Sathan Phimuk. It was familiarly known as Wang Lang ("Rear Palace"), as commoners often used the palace name to refer to its owner, who was the nephew of the king. At present, palace wall remnants survive in the area near the market.

The market extends for 300 m (984.3 ft) in a narrow lane that connects between Siriraj pier (or Wang Lang pier) and Arun Amarin road. Opposite to Tha Pra Chan pier in Tha Phra Chan neighbourhood, beside Thammasat University in Phra Nakhon district. Products include fashion clothing, salons, bakeries, sushi shops, restaurants, including a cafés. It is best known for its southern food restaurants, known for their spicy flavor. The nearby Phran Nok intersection has many more southern food restaurants.
