= Tha Phra Chan =

Pier on the Chao Phraya river, Bangkok, Thailand

Coordinates: 13°45′23″N 100°29′19″E

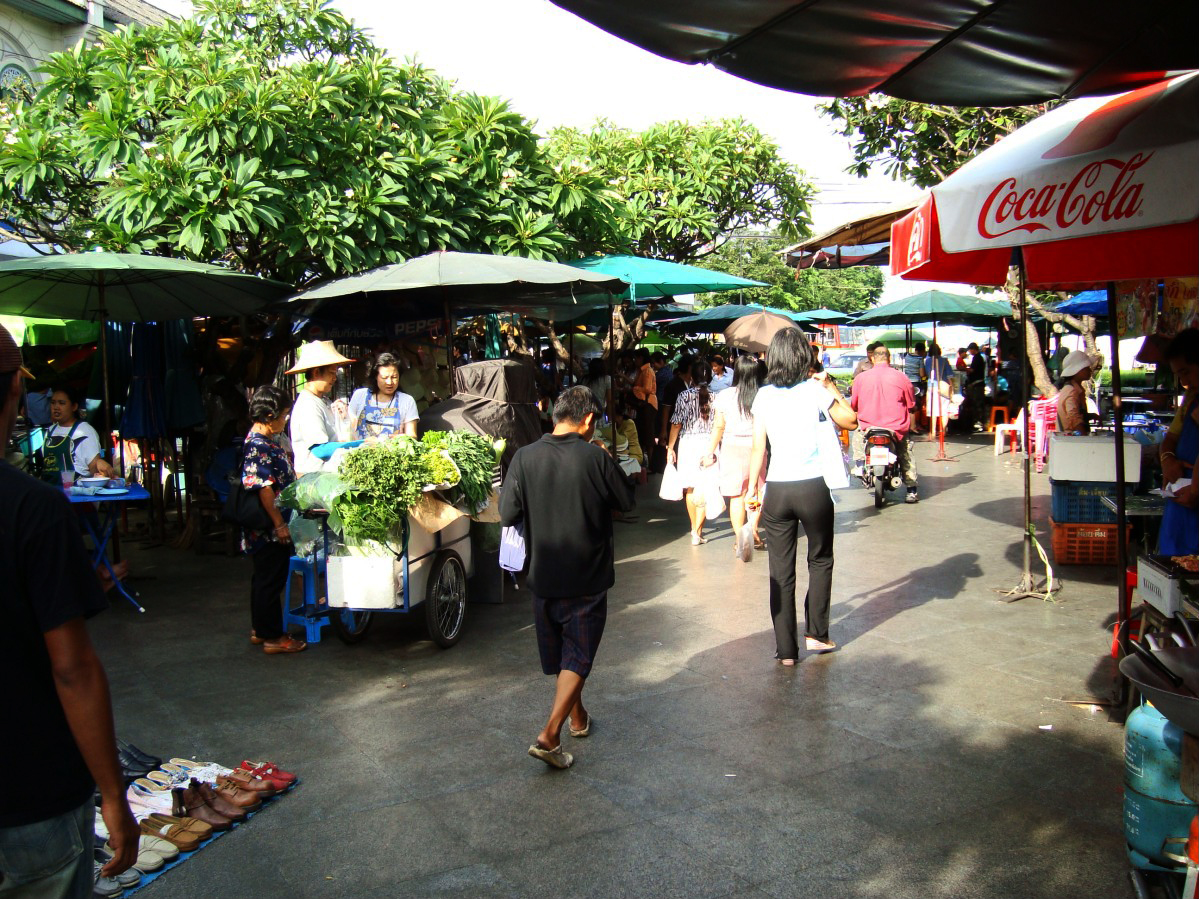
Market, Tha Phra Chan

Tha Phra Chan (Thai: ท่าพระจันทร์, pronounced [tʰâː pʰráʔ t͡ɕān]) is a pier on Rattanakosin Island, Bangkok, on the east bank of the Chao Phraya River, in Phra Nakhon District. The pier is beside Thammasat University's campus of the same name. Tha Phra Chan literally means 'moon pier' (tha, 'pier' or 'jetty', phra chan, 'moon'). More broadly, the name also refers to the area around the pier and the university. The area is also known as a marketplace for Thai amulets and astrologers. It is also full of shops, book stores, restaurants, and food stalls.

Tha Phra Chan today used to be the palace of Prince Prachaksinlapakhom (founder of Udon Thani Province) who dedicated the land to the privy purse. Later the area was rented by a ferry company. Its name is derived from Fort Phra Chan (ป้อมพระจันทร์), one of 14 fortifications around the Grand Palace dating to the early Rattanakosin period. These forts and moats were built to protect Bangkok (or Rattanakosin in those days), given their proximity to the Grand Palace and the Chao Phraya River. As time went on, the forts were demolished, but with their names still used for the streets and places around Rattanakosin Island. For Fort Phra Chan, in addition to being the name of the quarter, there is small road in form of soi Phra Chan Road (ถนนพระจันทร์). This road is one of the oldest in Bangkok. On the north side of the road is the wall of the Front Palace, now a wall of Thammasat University, and on the other side is Wat Mahathat Yuwaratrangsarit. The road is sheltered by big Burma padauk trees.

Phra Chan Road used to be longer. Currently, the missing section is the walkway in the middle of Sanam Luang.

Tha Phra Chan is busy during the day, as its Wang Lang Pier ferries commuters between the Phra Nakhon side (Bangkok) to the Thonburi side (Chao Phraya River west bank). On the opposite side of Tha Phra Chan are found Siriraj Hospital, Wat Rakhang, and the Thon Buri railway station, colloquially known as Bangkok Noi railway station, which is the origin of the Southern Line, including the Kanchanaburi Line, the Death Railway.
