= Bangkok Noi railway station =

Former railway station in Bangkok, Thailand

Siriraj Bimuksthan Museum พิพิธภัณฑ์ศิริราชพิมุขสถาน
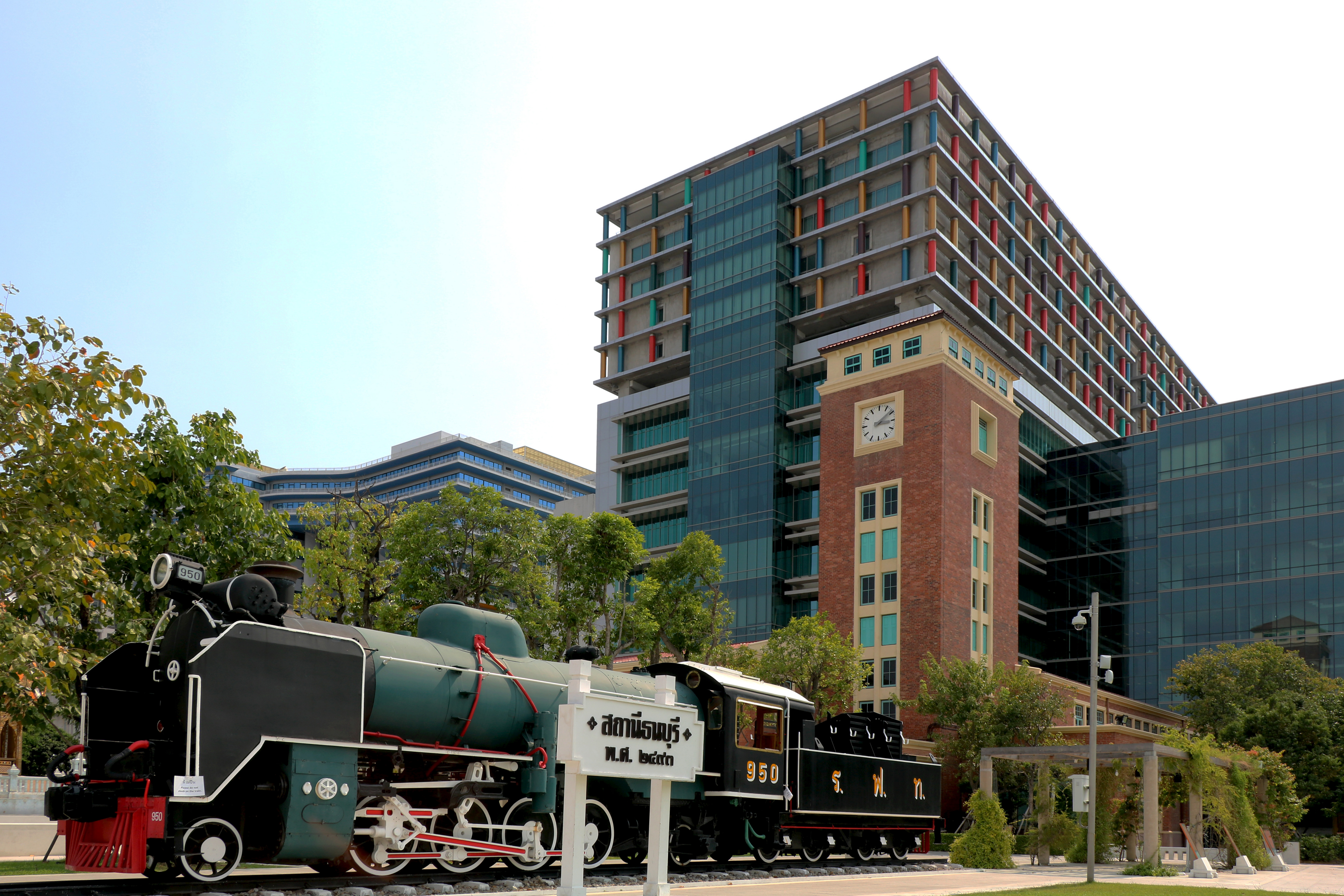
- Japanese steam locomotive Mikado No. 950 preserved at the buildings of Siriraj Museum and Siriraj Hospital

General information
- Other names: old Thonburi
- Location: Siri Rat subdistrict, Bangkok Noi district Bangkok; Thailand
- Coordinates: 13°45′35″N 100°29′13″E
- Owner: Faculty of Medicine Siriraj Hospital
- Line: Formerly part of Southern Line

Construction
- Structure type: Concrete building
- Architect: Vodhyakara Varavarn
- Architectural style: Brick Expressionism

Other information
- Status: Site exhibition

History
- Opened: 19 June 1903
- Closed: 4 October 2003
- Rebuilt: 1950
- Former names: Bangkok Noi
- Original company: State Railway of Thailand
Location

The Siriraj Bimuksthan Museum, originally known as the old Thonburi station (Thai: สถานีธนบุรีเดิม, RTGS: Sathani Thonburi Doem), built as Bangkok Noi station (Thai: สถานีบางกอกน้อย), is a Brick Expressionism style building in Siri Rat subdistrict, Bangkok Noi district, Bangkok. It was built as a railway station and terminus of the Southern Line of Thailand's national rail network from 1903 to 1999; closed in 2003; and renovated and reopened as a museum in 2013.

== History ==
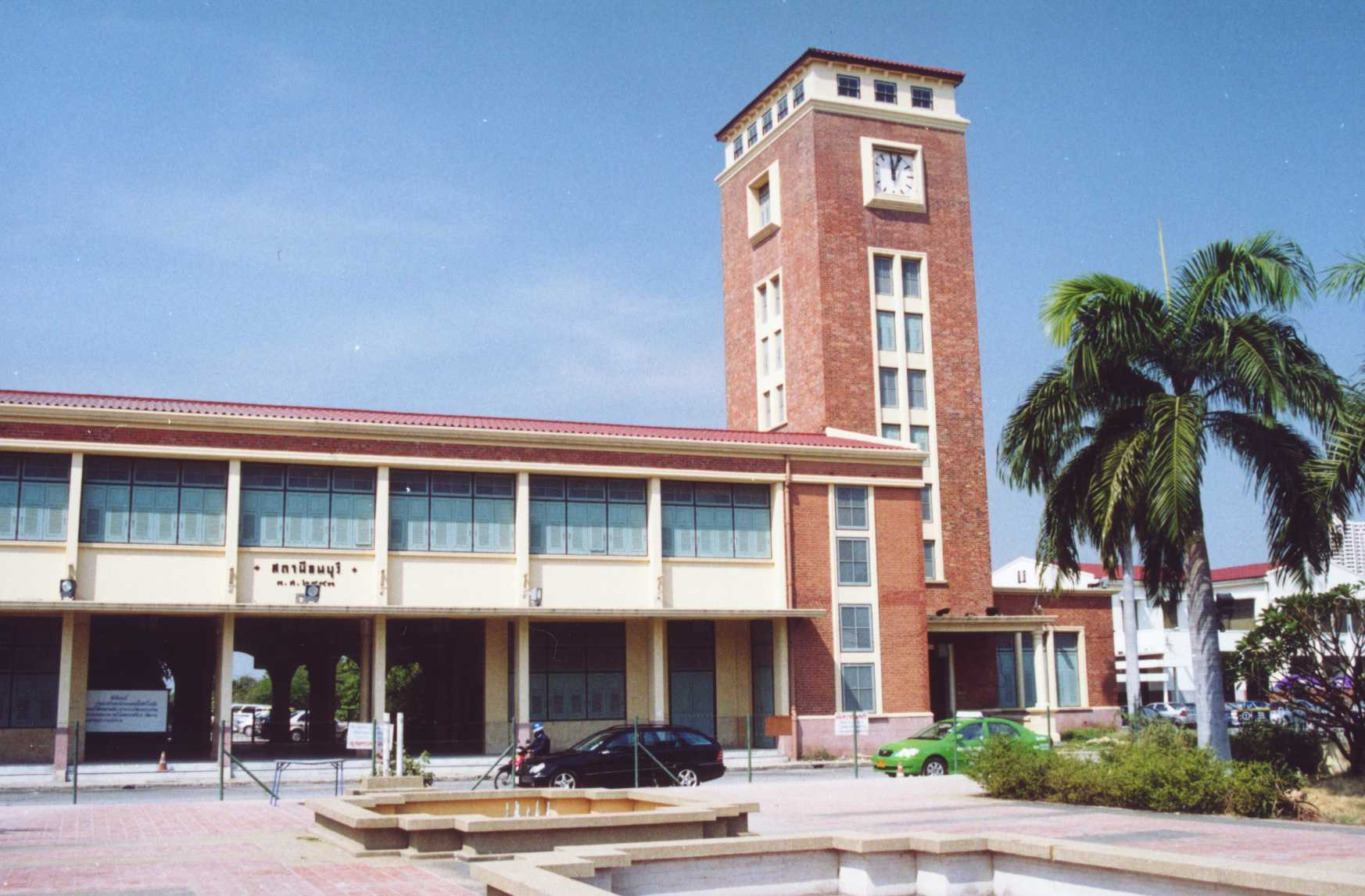
The station building in 2006

The Bangkok Noi Railway Station was opened on 19 June 1903, and served as the terminus of the Southern Line of the State Railway of Thailand's national rail network. The original building was designed by German architect Karl Döhring in the style of European brick expressionism. In 1942, the station was renamed Thonburi Station. During World War II, the station became strategically important as the Japanese base of operations for supplying the construction of the Burma Railway. It was severely damaged by repeated Allied bombing in December 1944 and March 1945. The station was rebuilt in 1950 to designs by Mom Chao Vodhyakara Varavarn, though its importance decreased toward the end of the twentieth century as more Southern Line trains were rerouted to terminate at Hua Lamphong Station. (The Southern Line had been connected to the Northern, Northeastern and Eastern Lines with the construction of Rama VI Bridge in 1927.) In 1999, to celebrate King Bhumibol Adulyadej's seventy-second birthday, the station and its surrounding areas were redeveloped into a park and parking and service areas for Siriraj Hospital. A new station (known as Bangkok Noi Station until 2003, now known as Thon Buri Station) was built about 900 metres from the original station to replace it as the southern terminus. Trains to the old station continued until 3 October 2003.

The ownership of the station and its grounds was subsequently transferred to the Siriraj Hospital Faculty of Medicine to serve as the site of the Sayamindradhiraj Medical Institute. In 2013, the station building was renovated to serve as the site of Siriraj Bimuksthan Museum. The museum's exhibits include those regarding the area's origins as the palace of Prince Anurak Devesh, who served as Rear Palace during the reign of King Phuttha Yotfa Chulalok, the building's former role as railway station, as well as the foundation of Siriraj Hospital and its medical school. The museum received the ASA Architectural Conservation Award for the 2020–2021 year in the award of merit for architecture and community heritage conservation category.

== Sources ==
- Zoom (20 March 2011). "จากสถานีบางกอกน้อย สู่...โรงพยาบาลศิริราช" [From Bangkok Noi Station to Siriraj Hospital]. Thai Rath (in Thai).
- "Siriraj Museum" (pamphlet). Siriraj Hospital.
