= Pak Kret Pier =

Coordinates: 13°54′53.78″N 100°29′40.92″E

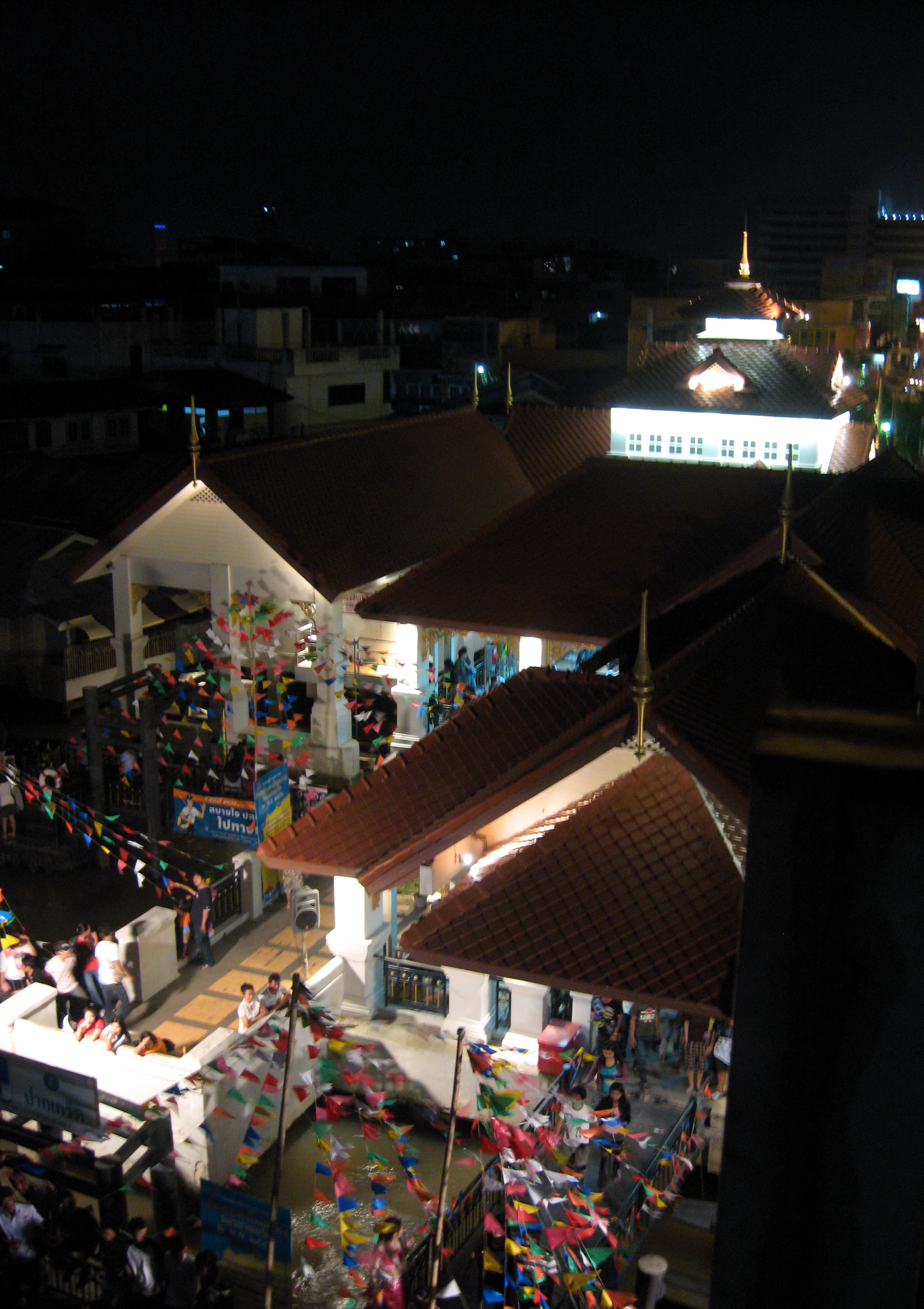
Pak Kret Pier on November 3, 2009 (Loi Krathong Night)

Pak Kret Pier (sometimes spelled Pakkret; Thai: ท่าน้ำปากเกร็ด, pronounced [tʰâː náːm pàːk krèt], ท่าเรือปากเกร็ด, pronounced [tʰâː rɯ̄a̯ pàːk krèt]), with designated pier number N33.

== Description ==
Pak Kret Pier is a pier on the Chao Phraya River in Tambon Pak Kret, Amphoe Pak Kret, Nonthaburi Province. It serves as the final stop of the Chao Phraya Express Boat route from Asiatique: The Riverfront in Bangkok and is maintained by the City of Pak Kret.

The pier is located beneath Rama IV Bridge and next to Wat Bo temple. Nearby, there is another pier providing ferry services to Ko Kret, a Mon settlement and a notable cultural attraction in Nonthaburi, as well as to Wat Toei in Tambon Bang Tanai.

The area around Pak Kret Pier is bustling with shops, restaurants, and a bus stop, making it a terminal for many bus routes. It is also famous for at least two eateries, including a wooden Thai restaurant on the Chao Phraya River.

== Transportation ==
- Chao Phraya Express Boat: Only the green-yellow flag boat serves this pier. There are six trips in the morning from 6:00 am to 7:50 am from Pak Kret to Sathorn in Bangkok. The return trips from Bangkok start at 3:45 pm, with the last trip at 5:45 pm. There is no service on holidays.
- BMTA bus: routes 2-36, 32 (2-5), 52 (1-6), 104, 150 (1-15), 166 (2-21E), 210 (2-27), 356 (commuter bus), 505, 506, 751
