= Chaloem Phan 53 Bridge =

Chaloem Phan 53 Bridge สะพานเฉลิมพันธุ์ ๕๓
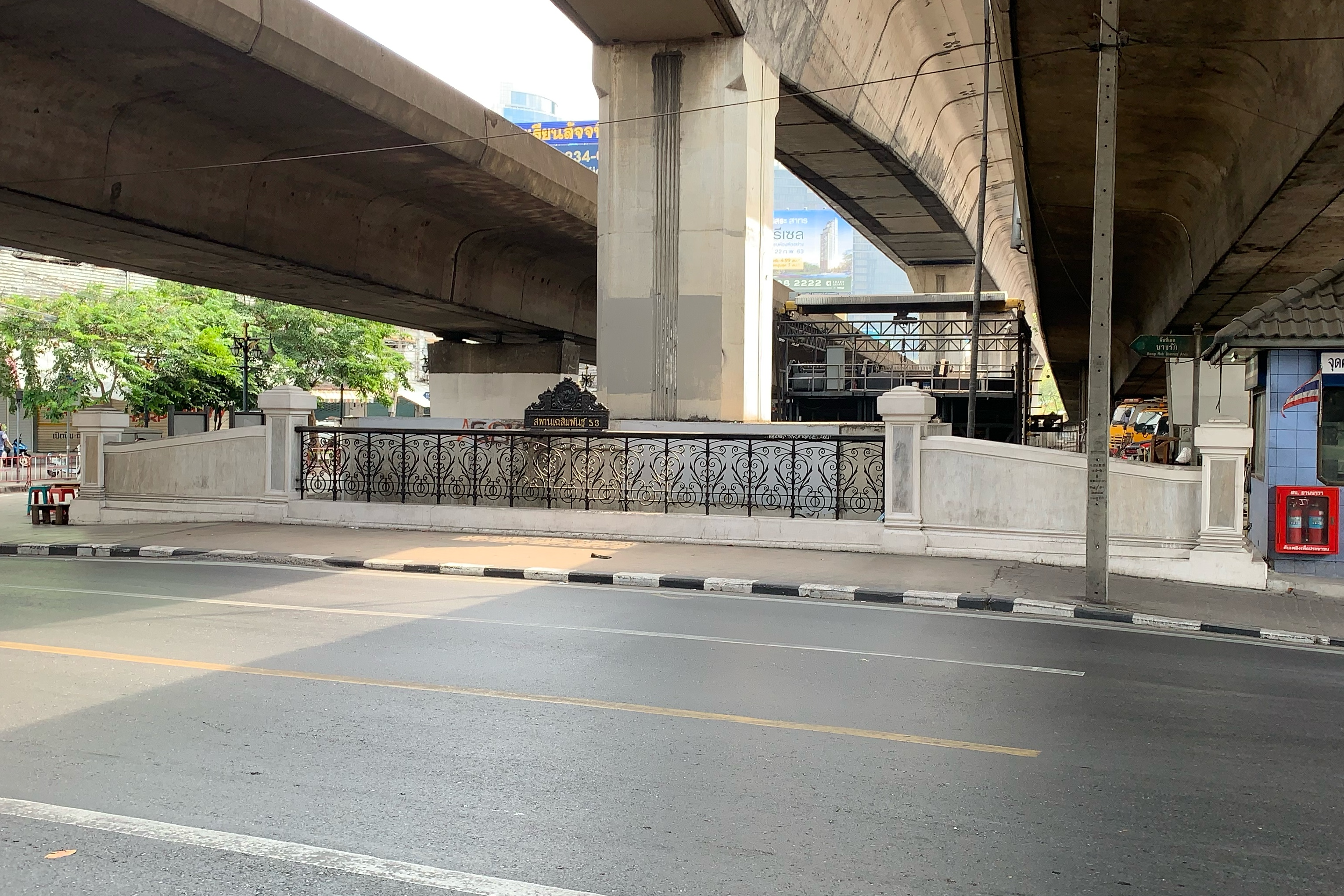
- Chaloem Phan 53 Bridge
- Coordinates: 13°43′06.93″N 100°30′54.44″E
- Carries: Charoen Krung Road
- Crosses: Khlong Sathon
- Locale: Yan Nawa Sub-district, Sathon District and Si Lom Sub-district, Bang Rak District, Bangkok, Thailand
- Official name: Chaloem Phan 53 Bridge
- Maintained by: Bangkok Metropolitan Administration (BMA)

History
- Opened: November 15, 1906

Location
- Interactive map of Chaloem Phan 53 Bridge

Chaloem Phan 53 Bridge (Thai: สะพานเฉลิมพันธุ์ 53, RTGS: Saphan Chaloem Phan Sam Sip Sam, pronounced [sà.pʰaːn t͡ɕʰa.lɤ̌ːm pʰān sâːm sìp sǎːm]) is a bridge in Bangkok's Yan Nawa sub-district, Sathon district and Si Lom sub-district, Bang Rak District.

== History & characteristics ==
It is a bridge across the mouth of Khlong Sathon on Charoen Krung Road, forming a three-way junction linking North Sathon, South Sathon, and Charoen Krung Roads, known as Chaloem Phan Junction. Taksin Bridge spans the Chao Phraya River above, next to Saphan Taksin BTS station in Bang Rak.

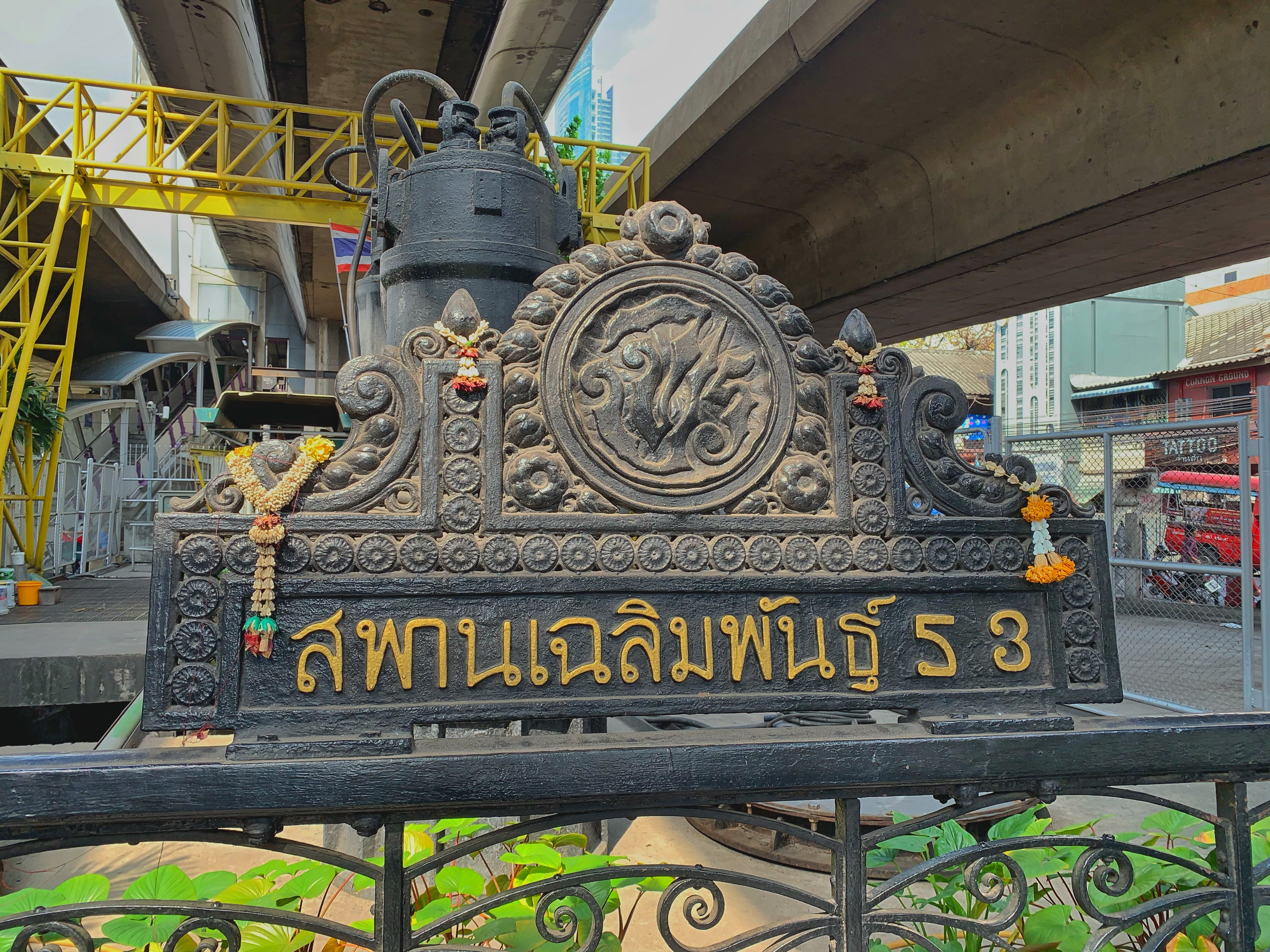
Nameplate of The Bridge

Chaloem Phan 53 Bridge is one of 17 in the Chaloem bridge series, built annually at various locations in Bangkok to commemorate King Chulalongkorn's birthday. This bridge, completed for the king's 53rd anniversary, opened on November 15, 1906. It was originally a wooden structure crossing Khlong Wat Sam Chin near Wat Traimit at the start of Yaowarat Road (close to today's Odeon Circle) before being rebuilt in its current form.

Today, Chaloem Phan 53 Bridge is one of only three in the series that remain in their original condition. It was registered as an ancient monument by the Fine Arts Department in 1975 and is still in use.

== Nearby places ==
- Sathorn Pier (CEN.)
- Taksin Bridge
- Saphan Taksin BTS station
- Wat Yannawa
- Joss House of the Goddess Brahma Met
- Robinson Bangrak
- Shangri-La Hotel, Bangkok

== See also ==
- Chaloem Phao
