= Water transport in Bangkok =

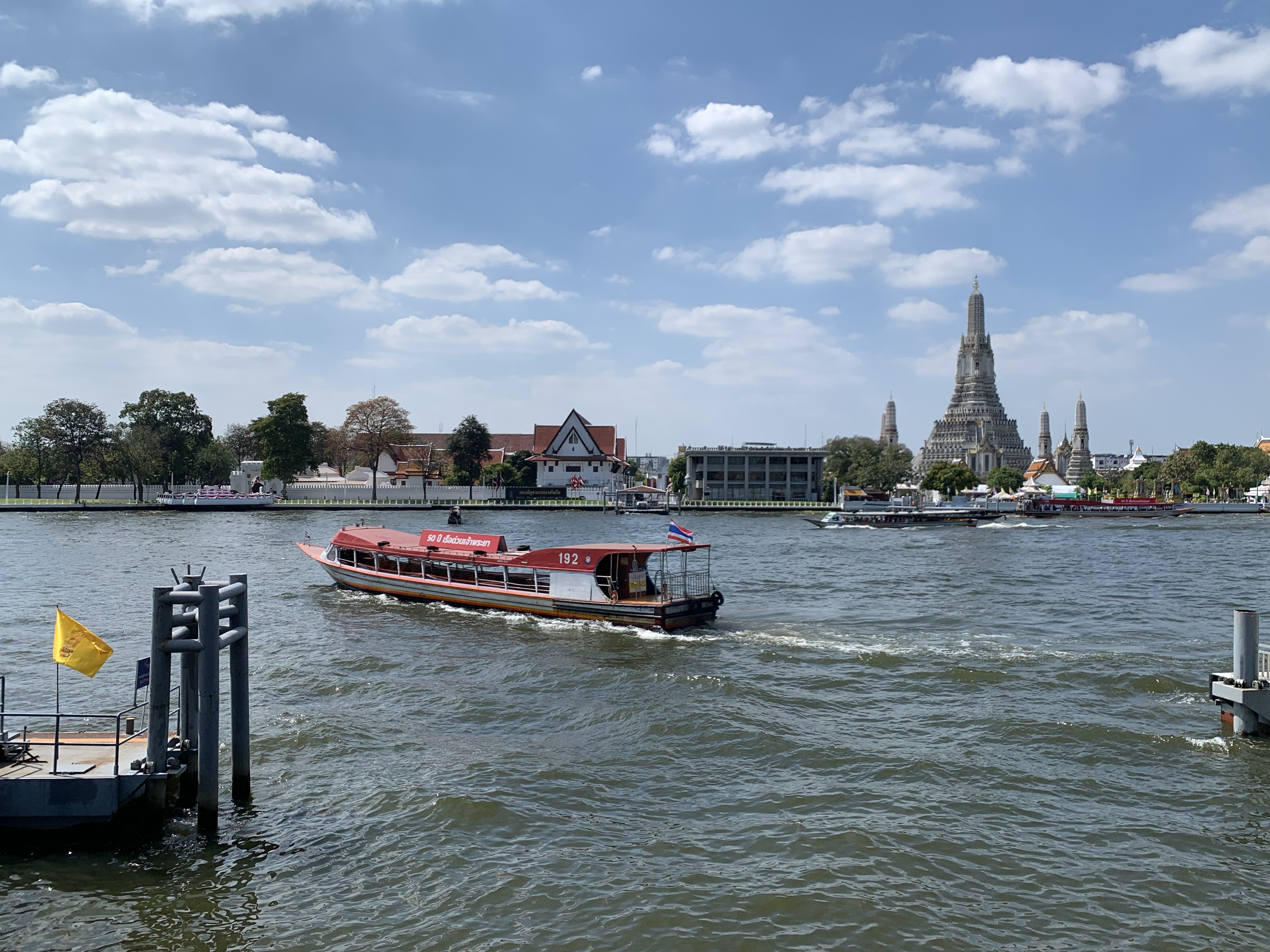
Chao Phraya Express Boat on the Chao Phraya, Wat Arun is visible in the background

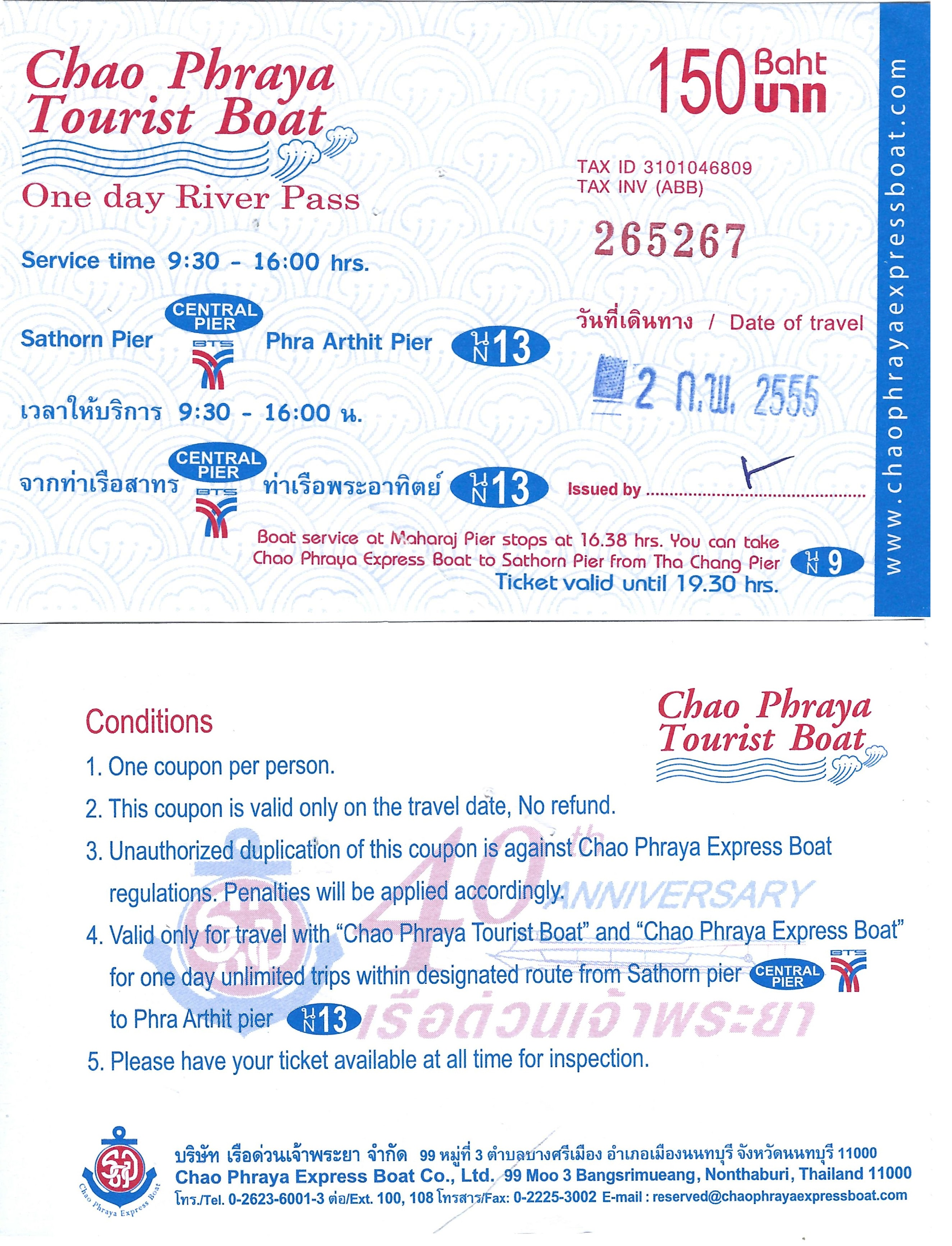
One day Ticket for tourists (2012)

Bangkok, Thailand, has an extensive water transport system serving passengers crossing or travelling along the Chao Phraya River as well as certain canals.

== List of service ==
=== Current service ===
- The Chao Phraya Express Boat service is a water bus which carries passengers along the Chao Phraya, regularly serving thirty-four stops from Rat Burana to Nonthaburi.
- The MINE Smart Ferry is an electric water bus service that operates three routes across Bangkok and Nonthaburi
- Ferries operate at thirty-two crossings of the Chao Phraya within Bangkok, as well as Nonthaburi and Samut Prakan Provinces.
- Long-tail boats serve fifteen regular routes along the Chao Phraya.
- The Khlong Saen Saep boat service travels along Saen Saep Canal, serving twenty-seven stops from Wat Si Bun Rueang to Phan Fa Lilat.
- The Khlong Phra Khanong boat service serves thirteen stops along the Phra Khanong Canal from Iam Sombat to Phra Khanong (service suspended as of July 2025 due to canal works).
- The Rangsit Canal boat service travels along Rangsit Canal.
- The Khlong Phadung Krung Kasem boat service (old city), along Khlong Phadung Krung Kasem.

=== Former service ===
- The Khlong Phasi Charoen boat service travels along Phasi Charoen Canal - In April 2014, the BMA initiated a trial service of passenger boats along Phasi Charoen Canal. The BMA is also considering developing passenger boat services along twenty-eight other canals following the six-month test run.
