= Rajinee Pier =

Pier on the Chao Phraya River

Rajinee Pier ท่าราชินี
- Thai Smile Boat docked to drop off passengers at Rajinee Pier

General information
- Location: Wang Burapha Phirom subdistrict, Phra Nakhon district Bangkok; Thailand
- Coordinates: 13°44′30.1″N 100°29′38.8″E
- Owner: Marine Department
- Operator: Chao Phraya Express Boat Co, Ltd; Thai Smile Boat Co, Ltd
- Line: Chao Phraya River
- Platforms: 1
- Connections: Sanam Chai Station; BMTA Bus / Affiliated Bus; Taxi / Motorcycle taxi

Construction
- Structure type: Pier
- Architectural style: Thai architecture

Other information
- Station code: N7

History
- Rebuilt: December 23, 2022; 3 years ago

Passengers
- 2022: 1,900 daily (estimated)

Services
Preceding station	Chao Phraya Express Boat	Following station
Tha Tien towards Nonthaburi	Orange Line	Memorial Bridge towards Wat Rajsingkorn
Tha Tien towards Nonthaburi	Yellow Line	Memorial Bridge towards Sathorn
Tha Tien towards Pakkret	Green Line	Memorial Bridge towards Sathorn
Location

Rajinee Pier, also written as Rajini Pier (ท่าราชินี, RTGS: Tha Rachini, pronounced [tʰâː râː.t͡ɕʰīː.nīː]) with designated pier number N7, is a pier on the Chao Phraya River located at the Wang Burapha Phirom Subdistrict, Phra Nakhon District in the area of Pak Khlong Talat on the Rattanakosin Island.

The pier is named after Rajini School, one of the oldest all-girls secondary schools located right beside it. The pier serves the Chao Phraya Express Boat and is known for its scenic views. From this side of the river, one can see Santa Cruz Church, the pagoda of Wat Prayurawongsawat, and three adjoining white Thai-style pavilions that house the City Law Enforcement Department's head office, which was once the Thonburi Provincial Hall. Altogether, this area is known as Kudi Chin, a historic neighbourhood dating back to before the founding of Rattanakosin (present-day Bangkok), originally settled by Thai people of mixed Chinese and Portuguese descent.

Rajinee Pier is situated between Yodpiman Pier (N6/1) and Wat Arun Pier (N7/1) and is among the busiest, both for passengers and tourists. It offers convenient connections to other public transport systems, including the MRT Blue Line at Sanam Chai Station, as well as several BMTA bus routes, such as lines 5, 4-48 (7ก), 2-38 (8), 3-41 (47), 2-9 (53), and 2-45 (73).

In 2022, the pier was renovated as part of the Marine Department's Smart Pier initiative and reopened in late December. The facility is a two-story passenger terminal covering 1,277 square meters, with a rooftop terrace serving as a riverside viewpoint and multi-purpose space. Its interior design highlights elements of Thai identity, blending modern functionality with cultural aesthetics.

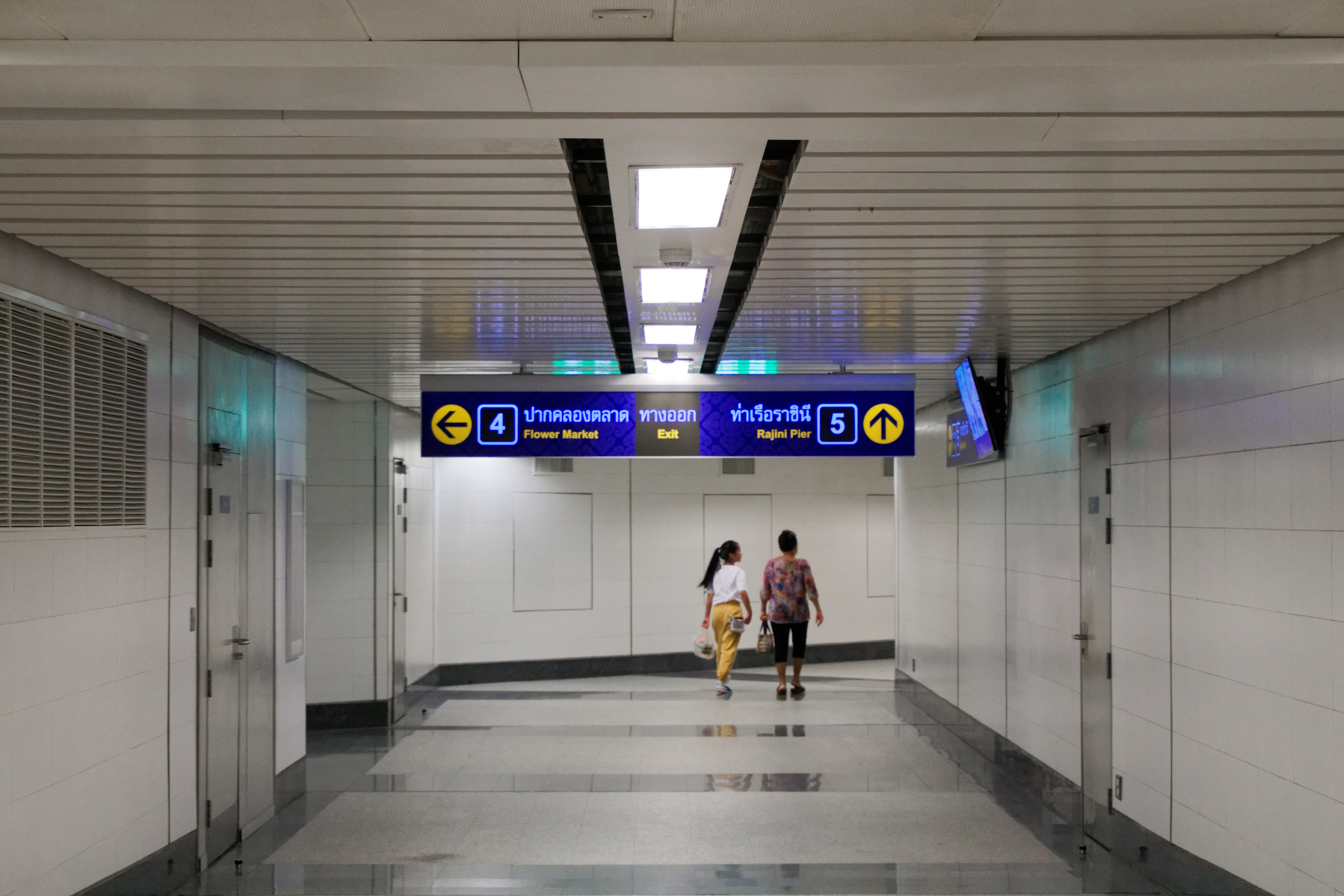
MRT Sanam Chai exit sign for entrance 4 (Pak Klong Talat, or the Flower Market) and 5 (Rajini Pier)
