= Thai Smile Boat =

Ferry service in Thailand

Thai Smile Boat ไทย สมายล์ โบ้ท
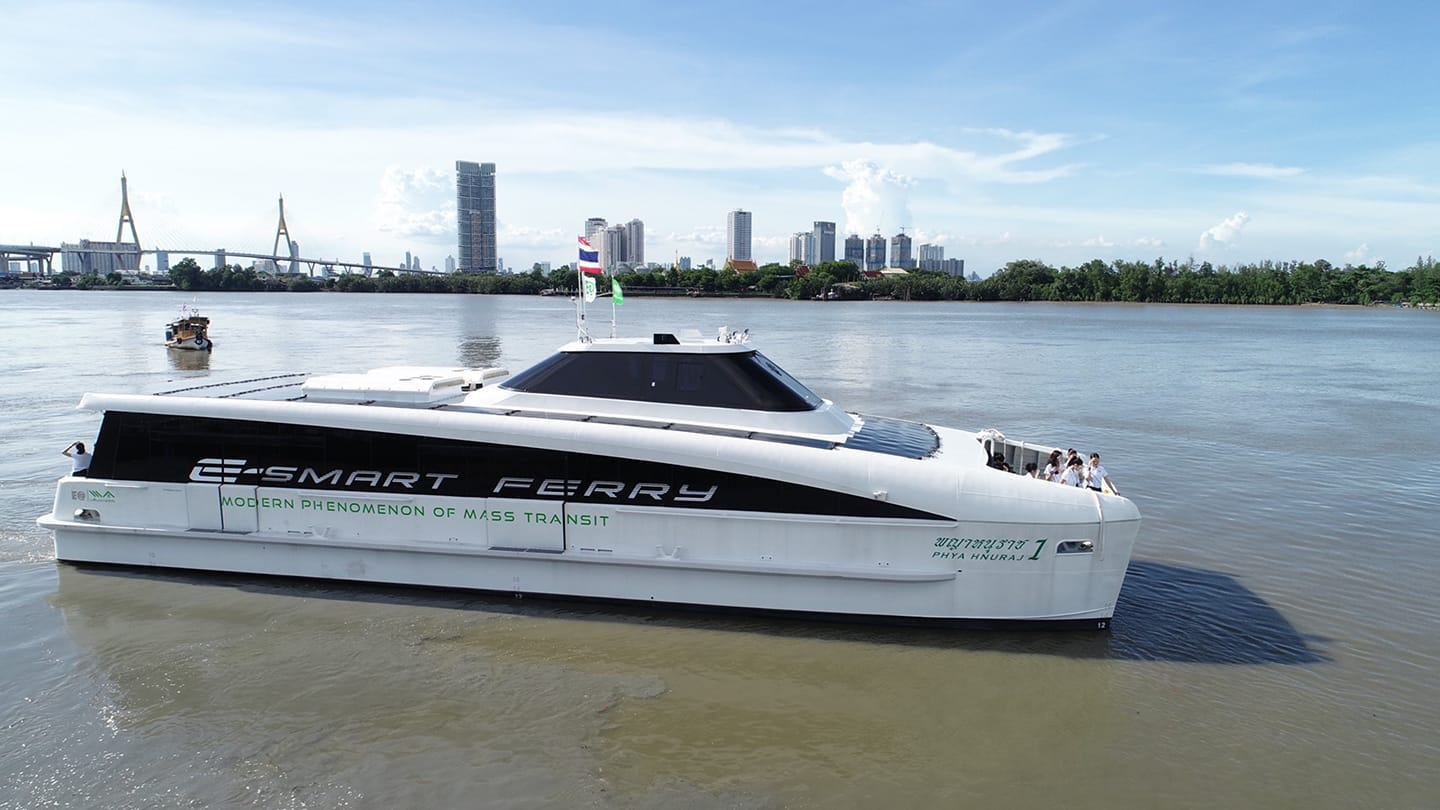
- Series1 Mine Smart Ferry Urban line
- Waterway: Chao Phraya River
- Transit type: Electric Catamaran Ferry
- Route: • City Line Phra Pinklao Bridge-Sathorn • Metro Line Rama VII Bridge-Watworachanyawas • Urban Line Phra Nang Klao-Sathorn
- Owner: E@ Pub Co., Ltd.
- Operator: Thai Smile Boat Co., Ltd
- Authority: Marine Department; Bangkok Metropolitan Administration
- Began operation: 2020
- System length: 22 miles
- No. of lines: 3
- No. of vessels: 35
- Hubs: Sathorn Pier
- No. of terminals: 22 Piers
- Connections at Chao Phraya Express Boat

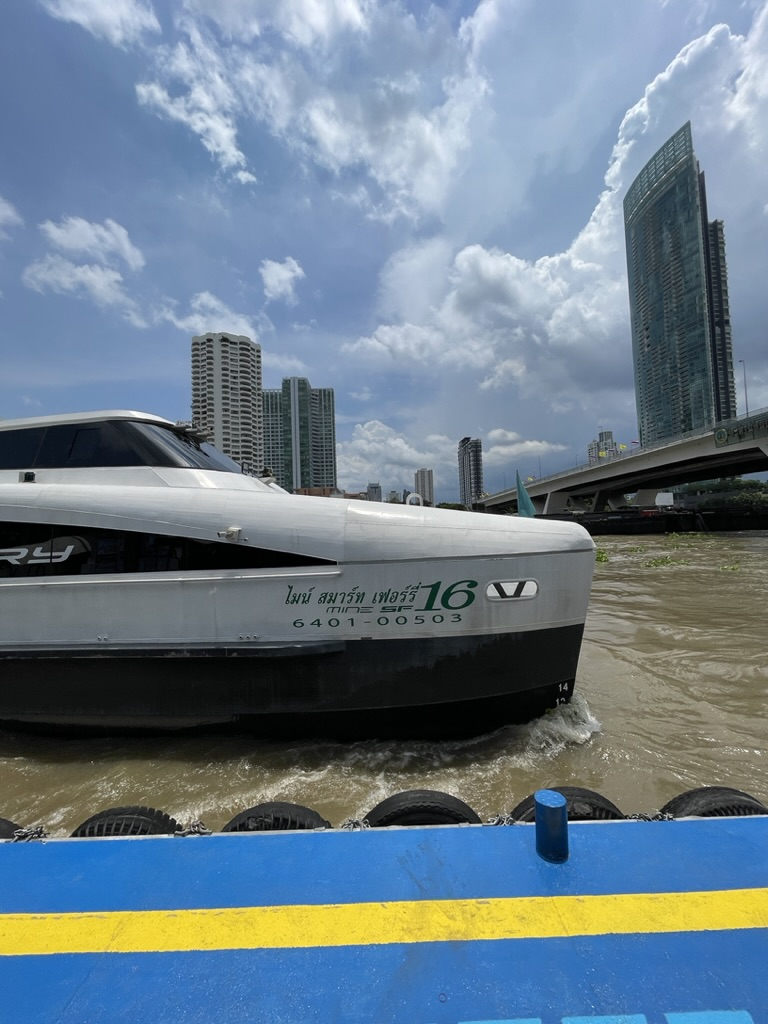
A Mine Smart Ferry at Sathorn Pier, Bangkok

The Thai Smile Boat (Thai: ไทย สมายล์ โบ้ท), formerly known as the Mine Smart Ferry (Thai: ไมน์ สมาร์ท เฟอร์รี่), is a transportation service in Thailand operated on the Chao Phraya River. Launched in 2021, the battery-powered Smart Ferry provides service between Bangkok and Nonthaburi.

Minesmartferry - Rajinee pier

Thai Smile Boat operates three services, the City Line (Sathorn Pier-Phra Pinklao Pier), Metro Line (Sathorn Pier-Rama VII Pier), and the rush-hour Urban Line (Sathorn Pier-Phra Nang Klao Pier).

== Boats ==
=== Series 1 (2020) ===
24M Electric Catamaran Ferry (250 passengers)

=== Series 2 (2023) ===
19M Electric Catamaran Ferry (150 passengers)

== Piers ==
Piers		Services			Transfers	Location
Piers		City Line	Metro Line	Urban Line	Transfers	Location
N30/1	Phra Nang Klao Bridge			●	MRT Purple Line (Phra Nang Klao Bridge station)	Nonthaburi
N30	Nonthaburi			●		Nonthaburi
N24	Rama VII Bridge		●			Nonthaburi
N22	Bang Pho		●		MRT Blue Line (Bang Pho station)	Bangkok
N21	Kiak Kai			●		Bangkok
N18	Payap			●		Bangkok
N15	Thewet		●	●	Phadung Krung Kasem boat	Bangkok
N12	Phra Pin Klao Bridge	●		●		Bangkok
N10	Wang Lang (Prannok)	●	●	●		Bangkok
N9	Tha Chang	●				Bangkok
	Wat Arun	●				Bangkok
	Wat Pho	●				Bangkok
N7	Rajinee	●	●	●		Bangkok
N6/1	Yodpiman					Bangkok
N6	Memorial Bridge		●			Bangkok
N5	Rachawongse		●			Bangkok
N4	Marine Dept.		●	●		Bangkok
N3	Si Phraya		●	●		Bangkok
	CAT Tower		●	●		Bangkok
N2/1	ICONSIAM		●	●	BTS Skytrain Gold Line (Charoen Nakhon station)	Bangkok
CEN	Sathorn	●	●	●	BTS Skytrain Silom Line (Saphan Taksin station)	Bangkok
S2	Watworachanyawas		●			
