= Taksin Bridge =

Taksin Bridge สะพานสมเด็จพระเจ้าตากสินมหาราช
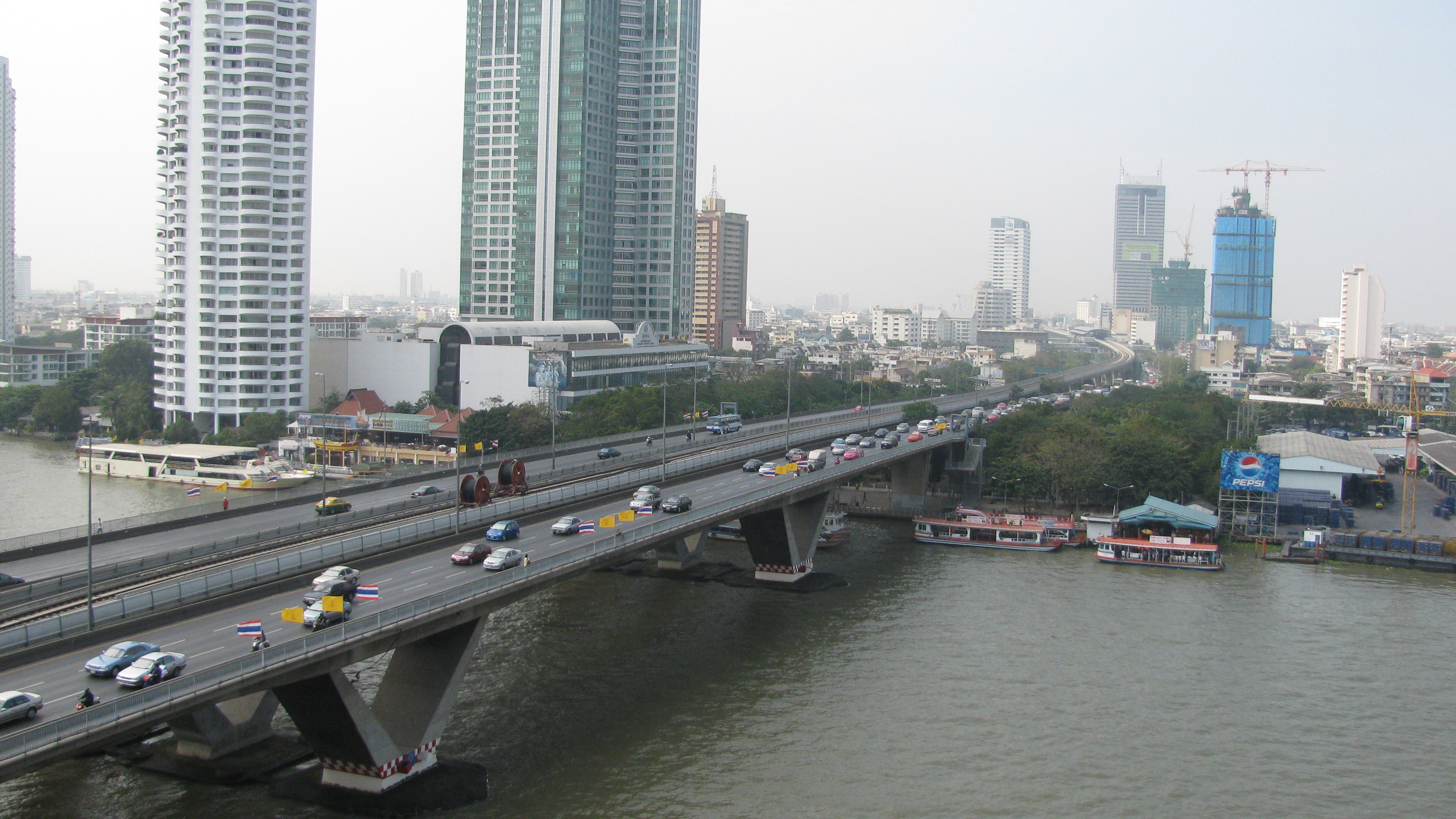
- Coordinates: 13.718791°N 100.512543°E
- Carries: 6 lanes of roadway, Bangkok Skytrain, pedestrians
- Crosses: Chao Phraya River
- Locale: Khlong San, Bang Rak, Sathon, Bangkok, Thailand
- Official name: King Taksin Bridge
- Other name: Sathon Bridge
- Preceded by: Phra Pok Klao Bridge
- Followed by: Rama III Bridge

Characteristics
- Total length: 1,791 m
- Longest span: 92 m
- Clearance below: 12 m

History
- Construction start: 1 February 1979
- Construction end: 5 May 1982
- Opened: 6 May 1982

Location
- Interactive map of Taksin Bridge

The Taksin Bridge (Thai: สะพานสมเด็จพระเจ้าตากสินมหาราช, RTGS: Saphan Somdet Phrachao Taksin Maha Rat, pronounced [sā.pʰāːn sǒm.dèt pʰráʔ.t͡ɕâːw tàːk.sǐn mā.hǎː râːt]; usually abbreviated to simply สะพานตากสิน, [sā.pʰāːn tàːk.sǐn]), or commonly known as Sathon Bridge (สะพานสาทร, RTGS: Saphan Sathon, [sā.pʰāːn sǎː.tʰɔ̄ːn]) is a bridge crossing the Chao Phraya River in Bangkok, Thailand.

== History ==
It is the sixth bridge built across the Chao Phraya River to link Sathon and Krung Thon Buri Roads in Thonburi side (after Rama VI Bridge, Memorial Bridge, Krung Thon Bridge, Krungthep Bridge, Phra Pin Klao Bridge, chronologically). His Majesty the King Bhumibol Adulyadej (Rama IX) presided over the opening ceremony of the bridge on 6 May 1982 on the occasion of Rattanakosin's 200th anniversary. The bridge was named in honours King Taksin, the founder and ruler of Thonburi Kingdom.

Before the construction of the bridge, the Chao Phraya River was crowded with huge ocean-going steamers, cargo ships, and passenger ships passing up river to the port in the north of Bangkok. After completion of the bridge, the port was moved to the south at Bangkok Port, also known as Khlong Toei Port.

== Characteristics ==
The bridge was designed with a large gap between opposing traffic directions to accommodate the canceled Lavalin Skytrain system. The disused foundations were eventually adapted for the BTS Skytrain, with train services across the bridge beginning on 5 December 1999.

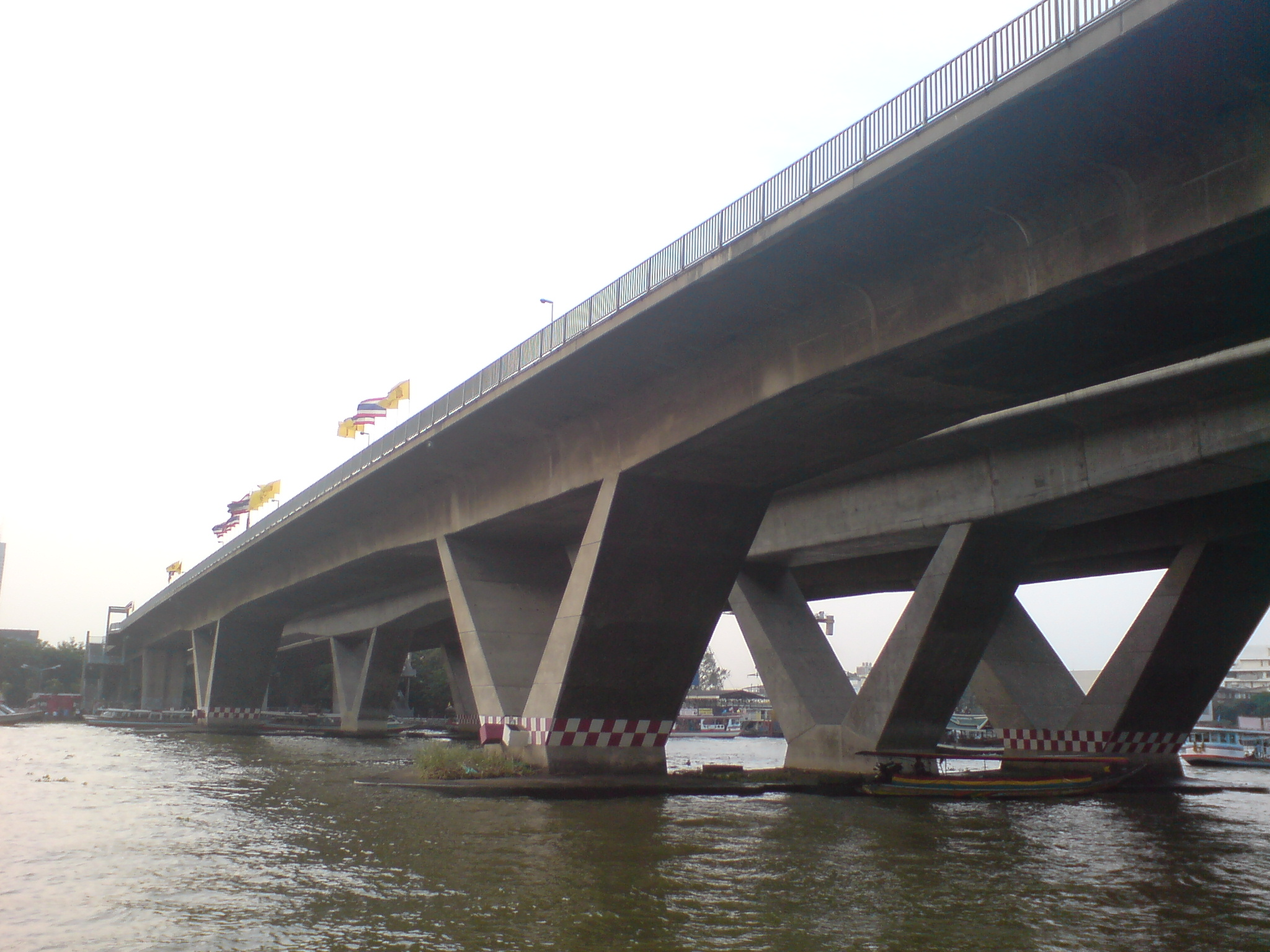
Under the bridge (seen from Sathorn Pier)

The entry ramp on the east side of the river contains the Saphan Taksin BTS Station as well as Sathorn Pier for the Chao Phraya Express Boat.

== See also ==
- Saphan Taksin BTS Station
