= Sathorn Pier =

Pier in Bangkok, Thailand

Sathorn Pier ท่าสาทร
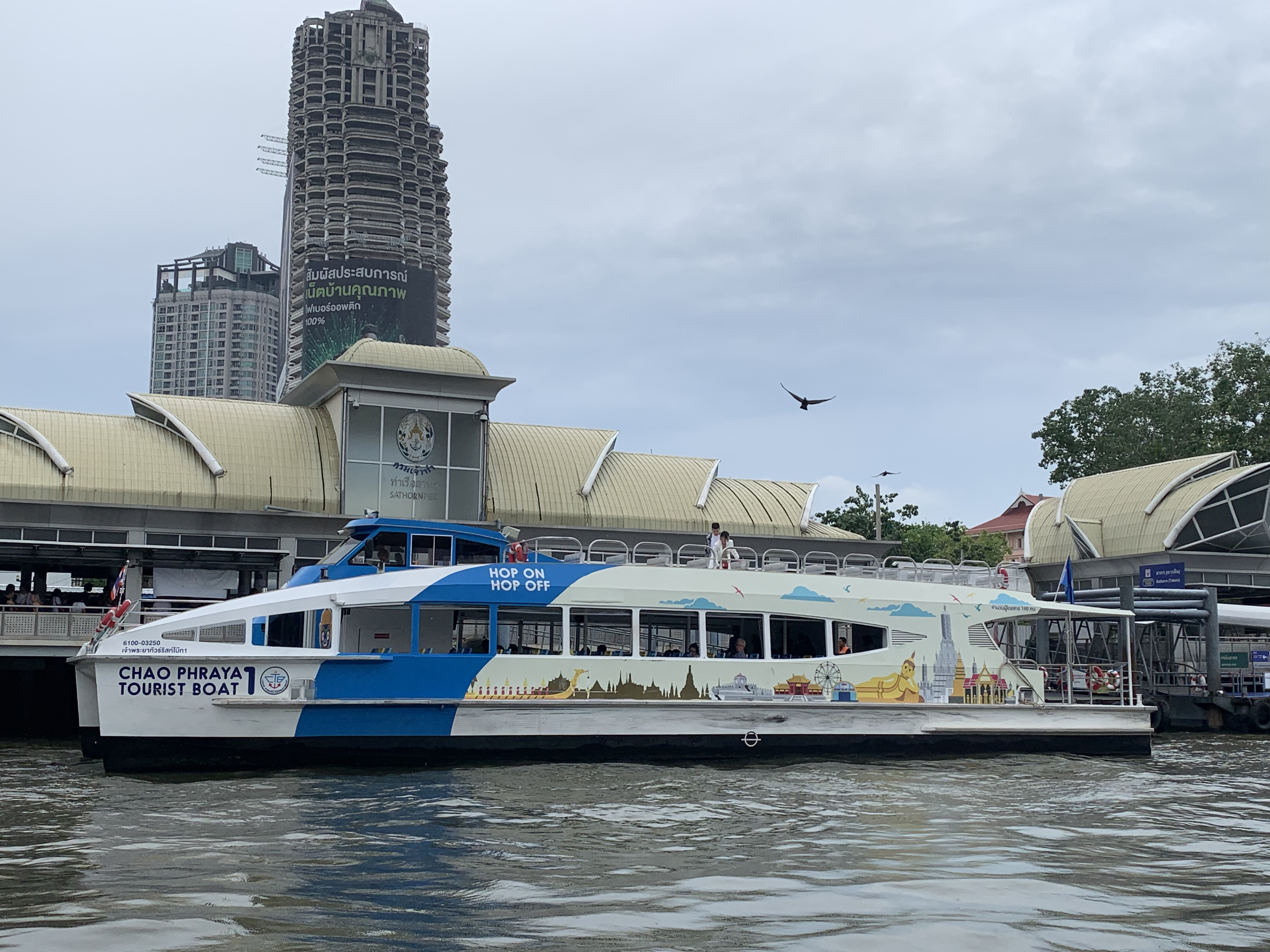
- Sathorn Pier, as being seen from the Chao Phraya River, with the abandoned Sathorn Unique Tower in the background

General information
- Other names: Taksin Bridge (ตากสิน)
- Location: Sathorn Road, Sathon District, Bangkok; Central Thailand; Thailand
- Coordinates: 13.7186°N 100.5127°E
- Operator: Chao Phraya Express Boat Co, Ltd
- Line: Chao Phraya River
- Platforms: 1
- Connections: Silom Line at Saphan Taksin

Construction
- Structure type: Pier

Other information
- Station code: CEN

Services
| Preceding station | Chao Phraya Express Boat | Following station |
|---|---|---|
| Oriental towards Nonthaburi | Orange Line | Wat Worachanyawas towards Wat Rajsingkorn |
| Wat Muang Kae towards Nonthaburi | Red Line | Terminus |
| Si Phraya towards Pakkret | Green Line | Terminus |
| Si Phraya towards Nonthaburi | Yellow Line | Terminus |
Location

Sathorn Pier (Thai: ท่าสาทร), with designated pier code/number CEN, is a major pier on the Chao Phraya River located beneath the Taksin Bridge, Sathorn Road in Bangkok, Thailand.

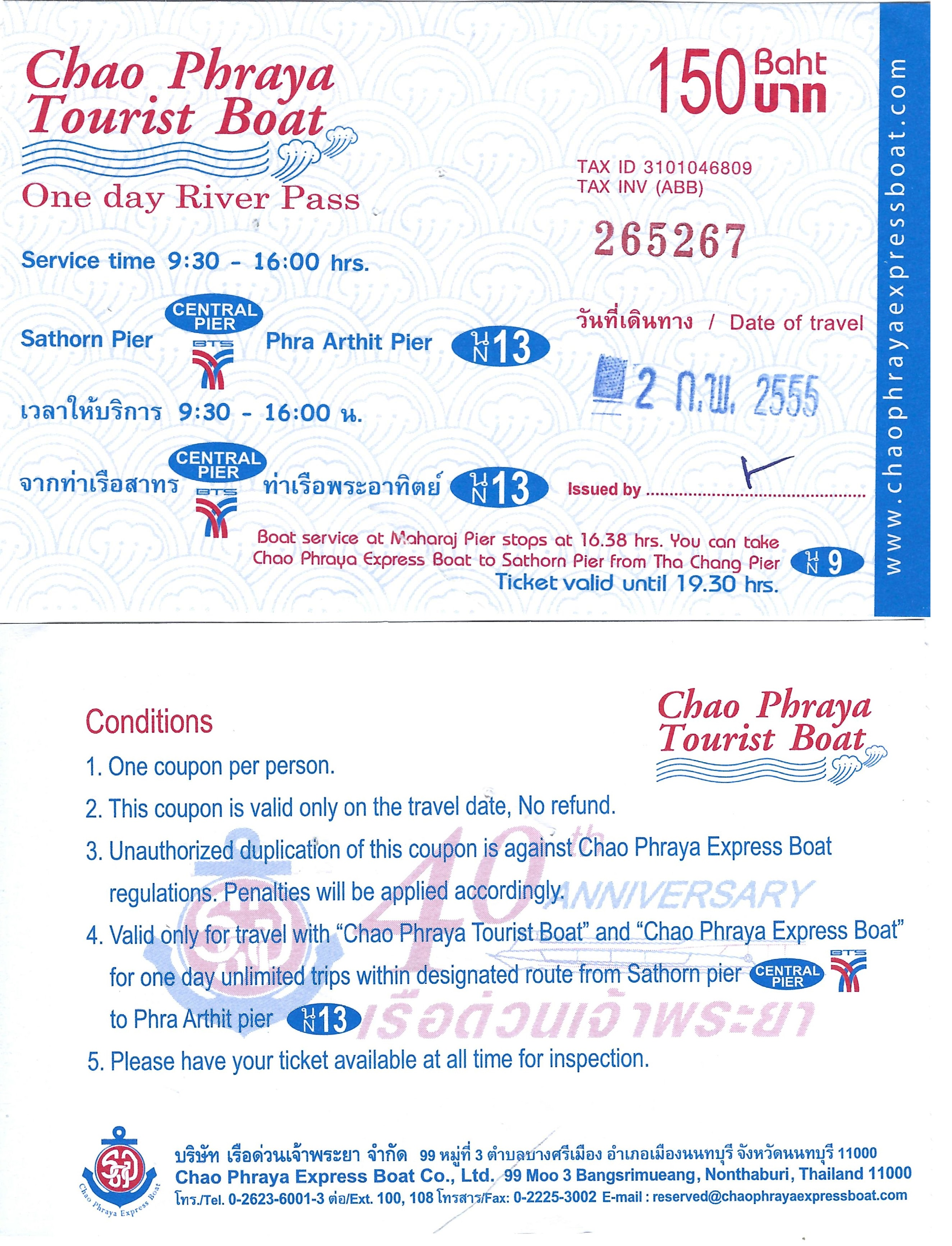
One day Ticket for tourists (2012)

It is the main pier for the Chao Phraya Express Boat and MINE Smart Ferry with all services stopping at this pier. There is also a cross-river ferry service from the pier to Charoen Nakhon in Thonburi. Sathorn Pier is located adjacent to the Saphan Taksin Station, making this location the only place for commuters to transfer between the Chao Phraya Express Boat service and the Bangkok BTS Skytrain Silom Line rail service.

The pier is adjacent to the Shangri-La Hotel, Bangkok.

== Nearby landmarks ==
- Sathorn Unique Tower
- Shangri-La Hotel
- King Taksin the Great Bridge
- Original Bangkok Touren in Deutsch
- Sathon Road
