= Khlong Phadung Krung Kasem boat service =

Boat service in Bangkok, Thailand

Khlong Phadung Krung Kasem Boat Krung Kasem Boat
- Handicapped/disabled access ferry/water interchange
- Khlong Phadung Krung Kasem boat near Hua Lamphong
- Locale: Thailand Bangkok
- Waterway: Khlong Phadung Krung Kasem
- Line: Thewarat-Hua Lamphong; Hua Lamphong-Thewarat
- System length: 3mi (5 km)
- No. of vessels: 9
- No. of terminals: 11 Pier

The Khlong Phadung Krung Kasem boat service operates an 4 kilometre route on the Khlong Phadung Krung Kasem in Bangkok. The service was introduced in 2016 as part of the revitalisation program of Khlong Phadung Krung Kasem and to alleviate road traffic in the inner city area. It was the first boat service in Bangkok that operated with electric boats and initially operated with only 4 boats, each with a capacity of 12 seats, which ran from Hua Lamphong to Thewarat Market. This was later increased to 7 boats on the route. The service was suspended following the outbreak of COVID-19 in Thailand in 2020 and there was much debate on the economic value of reopening the route. On 15 March 2023, the boat service reopened with 8 boats, following redevelopment plans along the canal. The service is currently operated by Krungthep Thanakom PCL, which is currently cooperating with King Mongkut's University of Technology Thonburi on the development of electric boats, seen as an effective way of reducing noise and pollution in the city.

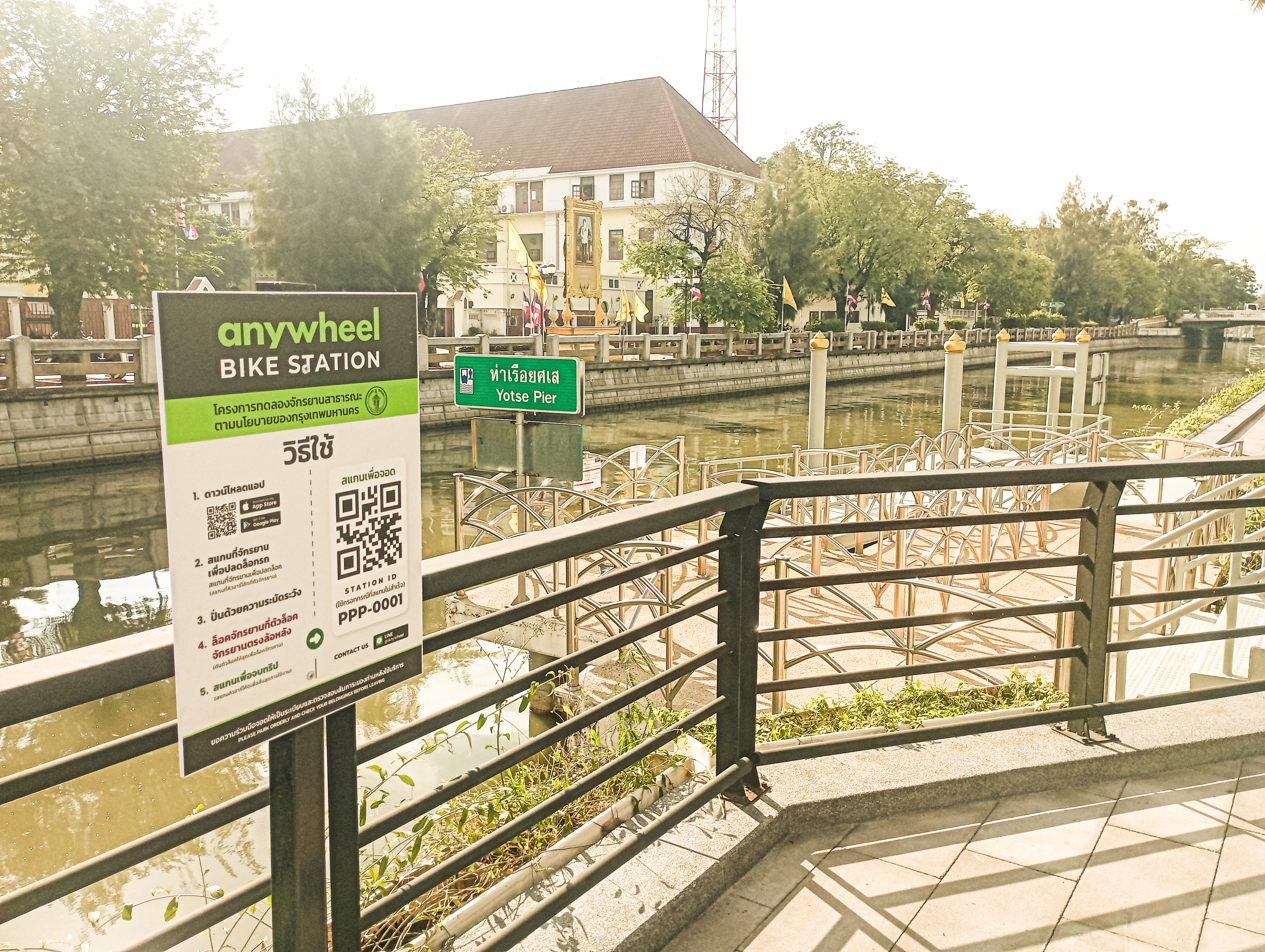
Yot Se Pier

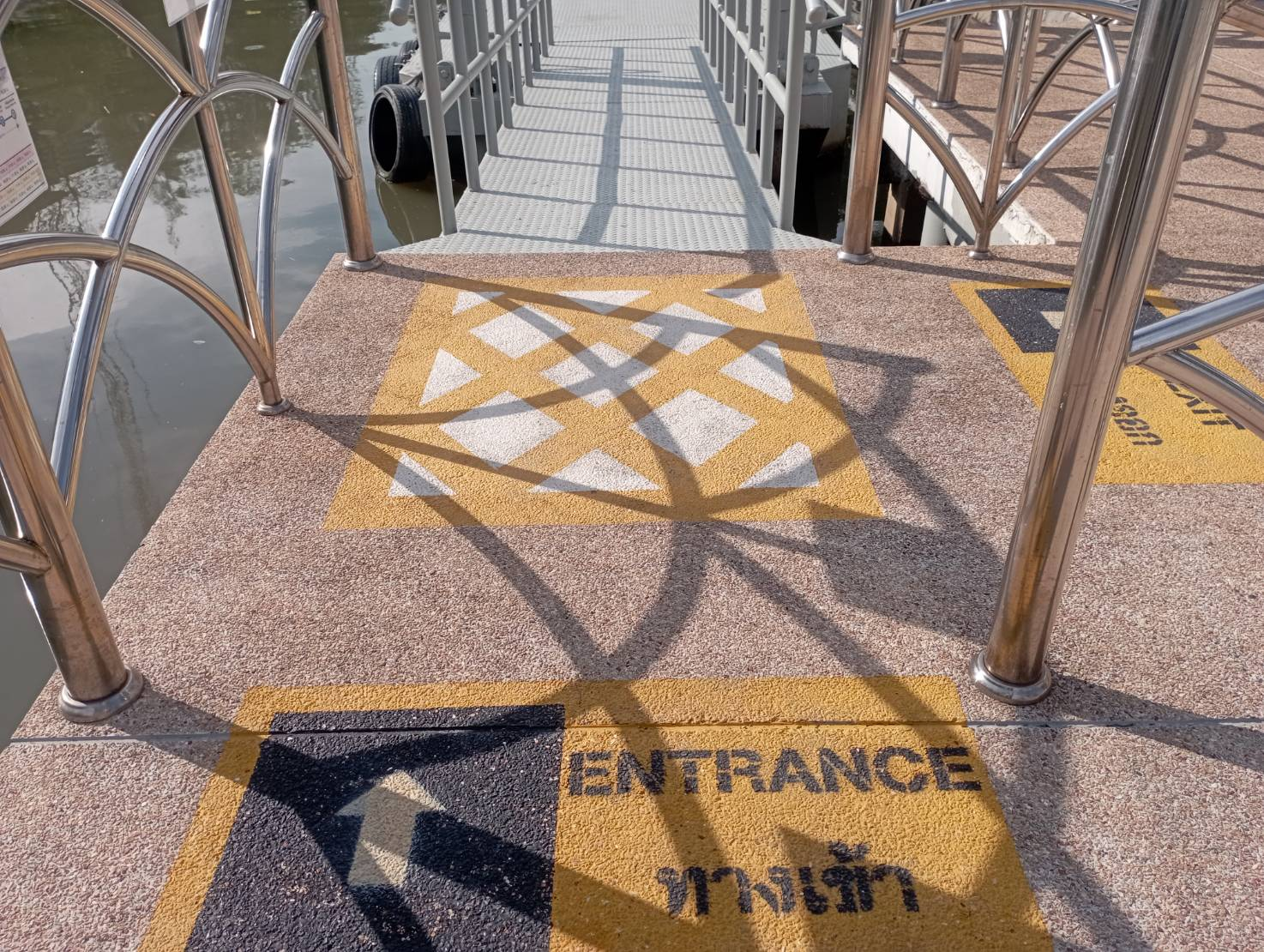
Wheelchair Access

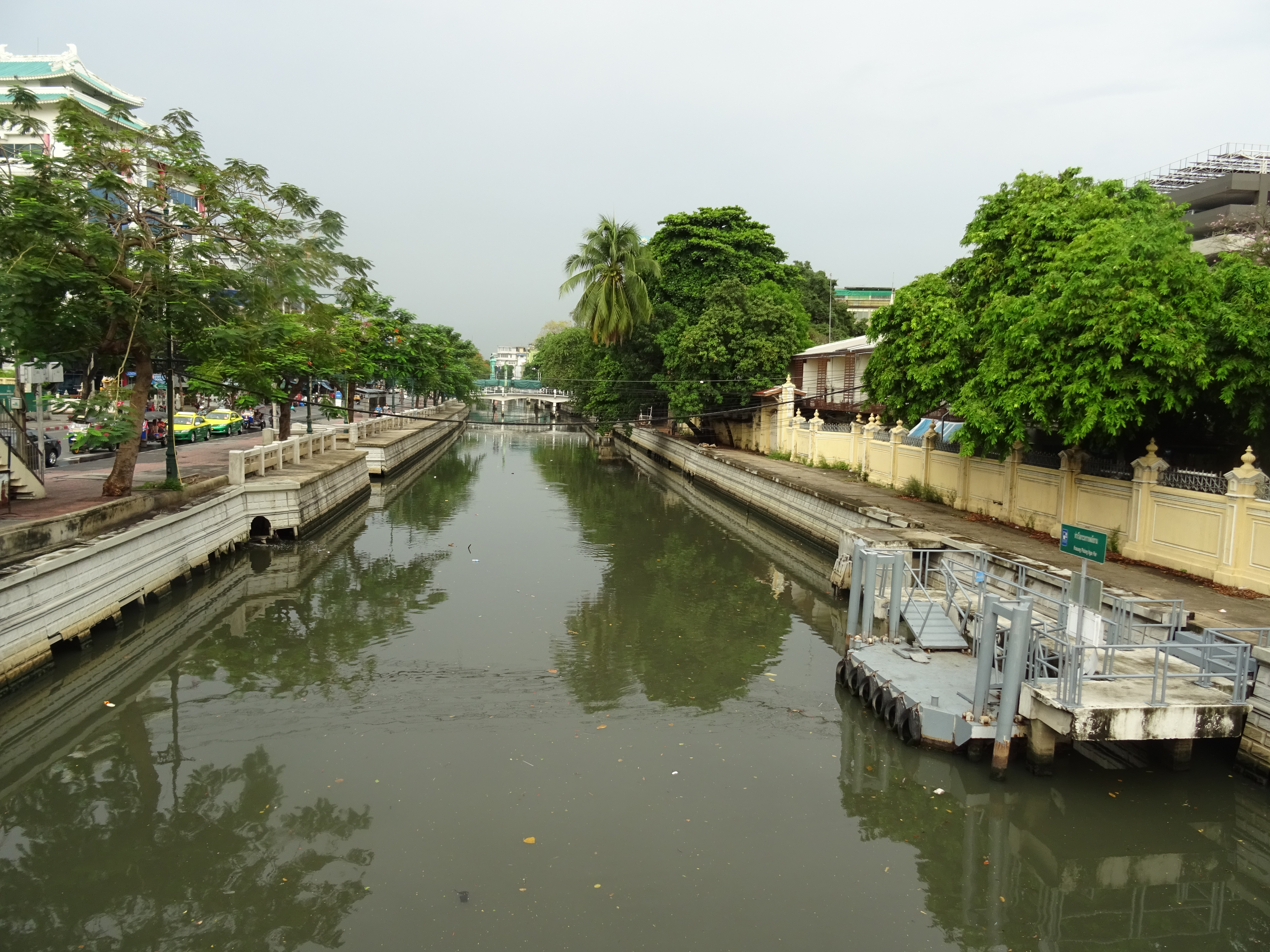
Ministry of Energy Pier in 2018

The boat service operates only during peak hours on weekdays between 06:00–09:00 and 16:00–19:30 at 20-minute intervals and between 08:00-19:00 at 1-hour intervals on weekends.

== Piers ==
Pier Code	Name	Thai name	Services	Location	Transfers
1	Hua Lamphong Railway Station Pier	ท่าเรือสถานีรถไฟหัวลำโพง	●		Bangkok (Hua Lamphong) railway station SRT MRT MRT Blue Line
2	Hua Lamphong Pier	ท่าเรือหัวลำโพง	●		
3	Noppawong Pier	ท่าเรือนพวงศ์	●		
4	Yotse Pier	ท่าเรือยศเส	●		
5	Krasuang Phalang Ngan Pier (Ministry of Energy)	ท่าเรือกระทรวงพลังงาน	●		
6	Lan Luang Intersection Pier	ท่าเรือแยกหลานหลวง	●		
7	Nakhon Sawan Pier	ท่าเรือนครสวรรค์	●		
8	Rajadamnoen Nok Pier	ท่าเรือราชดำเนินนอก	●		
9	Prachathippatai Pier	ท่าเรือประชาธิปไตย	●		
10	Thewet Pier	ท่าเรือเทเวศน์	●		
11	Dhevaraj Market Pier	ท่าเรือตลาดเทวราช	●		Mine Smart Ferry CHAOPHRAYA EXPRESS

== Boat Schedule ==
=== Hua Lamphong to Thewarat Market ===
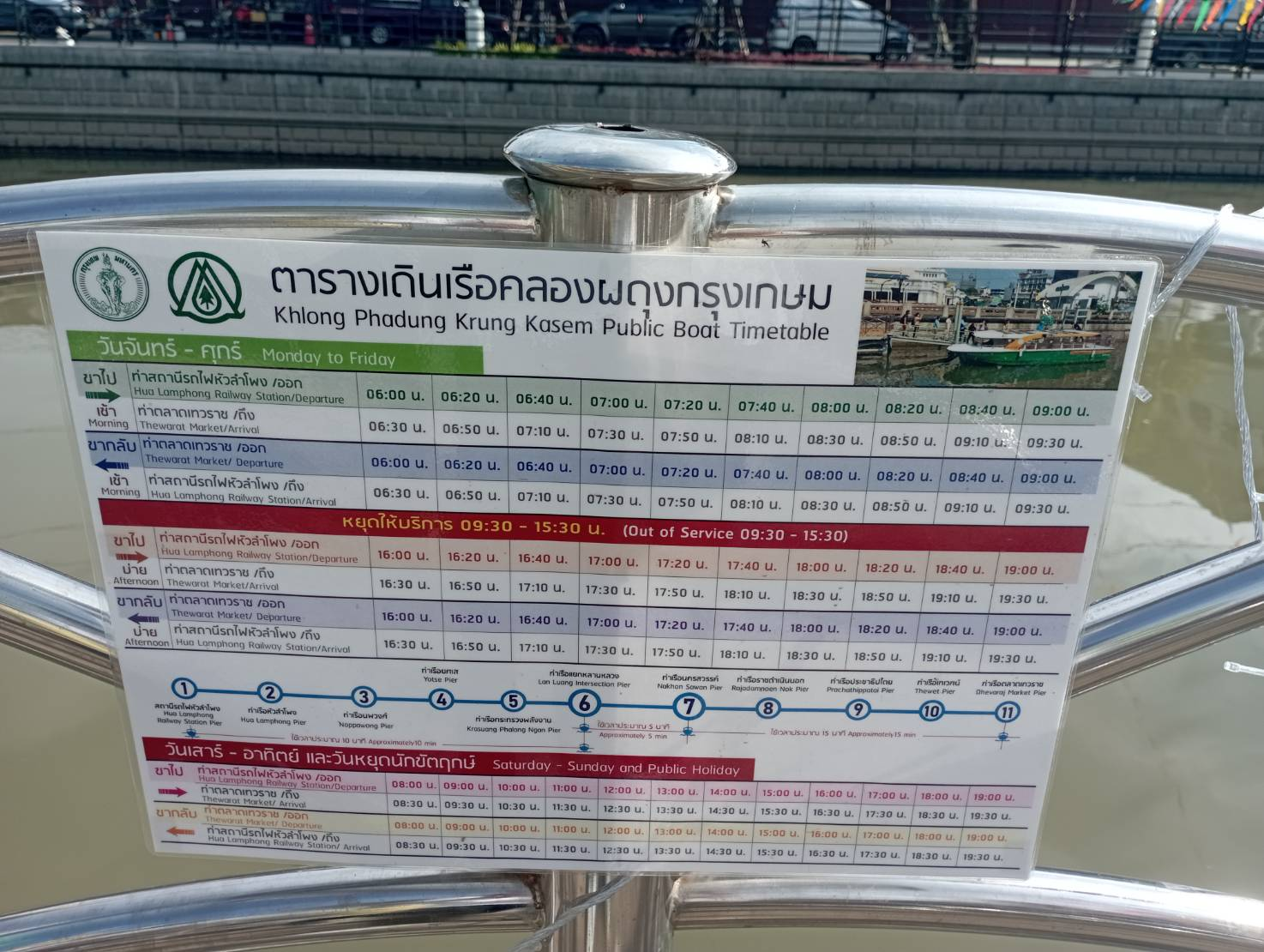
Schedule

==== Weekdays ====
Hua Lamphong	Thewarat Market
6.00	6.30
6.20	6.50
6.40	7.10
7.00	7.30
7.20	7.50
7.40	8.10
8.00	8.30
8.20	8.50
8.40	9.10
9.00	9.30
16.00	16.30
16.20	16.50
16.40	17.10
17.00	17.30
17.20	17.50
17.40	18.10
18.00	18.30
18.20	18.50
18.40	19.10
18.50	19.30

==== Weekends and Public Holidays ====
Hua Lamphong	Thewarat Market
8.00	8.30
9.00	9.30
10.00	10.30
11.00	11.30
12.00	12.30
13.00	13.30
14.00	14.30
15.00	15.30
16.00	16.30
17.00	17.30
18.00	18.30
19.00	19.30

=== Thewarat Market - Hua Lamphong ===
Weekdays

Thewarat Market	Hua Lamphong
6.00	6.30
6.20	6.50
6.40	7.10
7.00	7.30
7.20	7.50
7.40	8.10
8.00	8.30
8.20	8.50
8.40	9.10
9.00	9.30
16.00	16.30
16.20	16.50
16.40	17.10
17.00	17.30
17.20	17.50
17.40	18.10
18.00	18.30
18.20	18.50
18.40	19.10
18.50	19.30

==== Weekends and Public Holidays ====
Hua Lamphong	Thewarat Market
8.00	8.30
9.00	9.30
10.00	10.30
11.00	11.30
12.00	12.30
13.00	13.30
14.00	14.30
15.00	15.30
16.00	16.30
17.00	17.30
18.00	18.30
19.00	19.30

== Boats ==
1.Electric Solar passenger boat

2.Diesel passenger boat

== See also ==
- Water transport in Bangkok
