= Bill Bensley =

American architect

Bill Bensley (born February 2, 1959), born William Bensley, is an American landscape architect, architect, and interior designer who has designed over 200 hospitality projects in 50 countries. He is the founder and creative director of Bangkok and Bali-based design studio Bensley, established in 1989 and 1990 respectively.

== Early life and education ==
Bensley was born on February 2, 1959, to English immigrants, in Orange County, California. His father was a research engineer for NASA. Following a career day talk by landscape architect Rocco Campanozzi (Knott’s Berry Farm amusement park), Bensley joined California State Polytechnic University’s Landscape Architecture program. He credits this night with Bensley's unconventional presentation style now, where he unrolls meter-wide scrolls that are sometimes 15 meters long or more. At University, Bensley went on to win an award from the American Society of Landscape Architects which led to a full scholarship at Harvard’s Graduate School of Design, studying Urban Design under famed architect Moshe Safdie, and alongside Lek Mathar Bunnag, who invited him to come to Asia after they completed their studies at Harvard in 1984. The day after graduation, Bensley started backpacking across Europe, before going to Malaysia where he hitchhiked and exchanged sketches of people he met for meals, as he worked his way to Singapore.

== Career ==
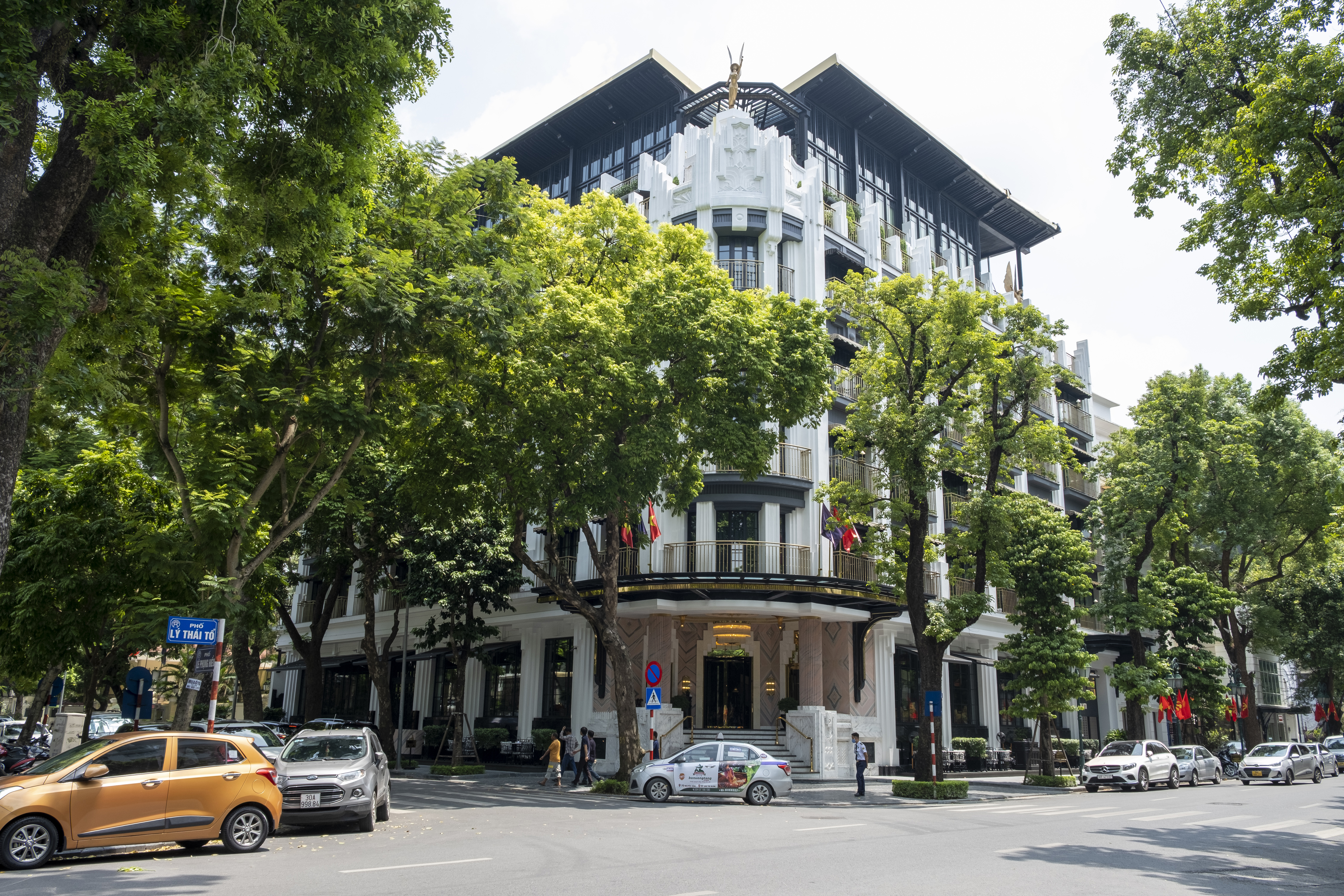
Capella Hanoi by Bill Bensley

After graduating from Harvard in 1984, Bensley joined Belt Collins & Associates in Singapore for 3 years, followed by 2 years in their Hong Kong office. In that time he learnt Indonesian and Malay, and familiarized himself with the Southeast Asian architectural vernacular, particularly that of Bali. Bensley then moved to Bangkok, where he opened the first BENSLEY studio in 1989, with a second in Bali in 1990. The studio's early projects included landscaped gardens for the Four Seasons Resort Hualalai, the Shangri-La Hotel, Bangkok, the Oberoi Udaivilas in Udaipur and the Anantara Hua Hin Resort & Spa. Private clients included Malaysian Sultan Mizan Zainal Abidin of Terengganu, and businessman Howard Feldman.

In 2006, the BENSLEY-designed Four Seasons Tented Camp Golden Triangle opened in Chiang Rai. It was the first Bensley tented camp project, and doubles as a sanctuary for rehabilitated elephants. A new concept in hospitality, it was awarded Conde Nast traveler Readers' Choice #1 Hotel in the World three years in a row. Gradually, BENSLEY grew from a landscaping studio to one offering architecture and interior design as well. In 2010 Bensley was awarded the AD100 – an annual survey of the best names in design by Architectural Digest. In response, he said in an interview: "We pride ourselves on our attention to every detail, from the architecture and gardens down to the napkin rings and signage." Bensley is often defined as a maximalist designer.

Bensley's work is centered around sustainability, with Tatler Malaysia writing that "he has made it his life's mission to preserve the sanctity of the Earth through focused ecological practices." At the Four Seasons Koh Samui he introduced the concept of Minimal Intervention: preserving existing landscapes through architecture built around trees and adapted to the existing terrain, rather than cutting down trees and disrupting natural drainage patterns. Bensley's dedication to conservation and sustainability continued with the opening of a tented camp in Cambodia's Cardamom mountains, under the Shinta Mani Hotel Group. Bensley purchased a piece of land "roughly the size of Central Park" to prevent it from being mined, and set up a 15-tent luxury camp, which helps fund Wildlife Alliance's work in the protection of the forest from poaching and logging – a common issue in the area. It was included in the now-canceled National Geographic Unique Lodges of the World, lodges which were all "dedicated to protecting the surrounding habitats and cultures". This is a new model of hospitality which blends conservation with high-end luxury. In 2020, Bensley self-published a white paper on sustainability called Sensible Sustainable Solutions. Architectural Digest called Bensley a "... pioneer in sustainable hotel design for the past three decades ... (who) not only anticipated the shift toward sustainability, but is also now sharing his hard-earned knowledge with others in the industry." The TV series Designing Paradise showcases his different projects across southeast Asia.

== Personal life ==
Bensley and his husband, Jirachai Renthong, a horticulturist, together run the BENSLEY studio, alongside their six Jack Russells: Chuck Berry, Bobby Brown, Sammy Davis Jr, Jesse James, Frank Sinatra, and Tommy Bahama. Bensley has two siblings, one of them named Ann, with whom he travels often. Bill Bensley is known to run daily, and paints in his personal time.

Bensley and Jirachai maintain two residences in Thailand, Baan Botanica in Bangkok and Estancia Botanica in Chiang Mai.

== Select work ==
- Capella Ubud, Bali, Indonesia
- Four Seasons Tented Camp Golden Triangle, Chiang Rai, Thailand
- JW Marriott Phu Quoc, Vietnam
- Rosewood Luang Prabang, Laos
- Intercontinental Danang, Vietnam
- Shinta Mani Siem Reap – Bensley Collection, Cambodia
- Shinta Mani Wild – Bensley Collection, Cambodia
- MGallery Hotel de la Coupole, Sapa, Vietnam
- Oberoi Amarvilas, Agra, India
- Little Saint James

== Awards ==
Year	Award	Nominee	Category	Result
2005	Architectural Digest	Bill Bensley	AD100: Top 100 Architecture & Interior Design	Won
2010	Architectural Digest	Bill Bensley	AD100: Top 100 Architecture & Interior Design	Won
2017	Hospitality Design	Bill Bensley	Platinum Circle Hall of Fame of Hospitality Design in New York	Won
2019	Surface Magazine	Bill Bensley	Travel Awards 2019 – Nomination in Adventure Camping Category	Nominated
2019	Ahead	Bill Bensley	Asia 2019 Outstanding Contribution Award for Hospitality and Design	Won
2019	Design Anthology	Bill Bensley	Magazine Awards 2019; Vanguard, Finalist	Nominated
2019	World Travel Awards	Bill Bensley	Outstanding Contribution Award	Won
2020	TTG Luxury Travel	Bill Bensley	Awards 2020 – Contribution to Luxury Travel Award	Won
2020	Interior Design Confederation, Singapore	Bill Bensley	Interior Designer of the Year – Designers' Choice 2020	Won

== Publications ==
- Tropical Paradise. edited with Tan Hock Beng. Hearst Book International. 2000. ISBN 978-0823054510.
- Paradise by Design. Tuttle Publishing. 2008. ISBN 978-0794604936.
- Escapism. Serindia Contemporary. 2016. ISBN 978-1932476828.
