= Krung Thon Bridge =

Krung Thon Bridge สะพานกรุงธน
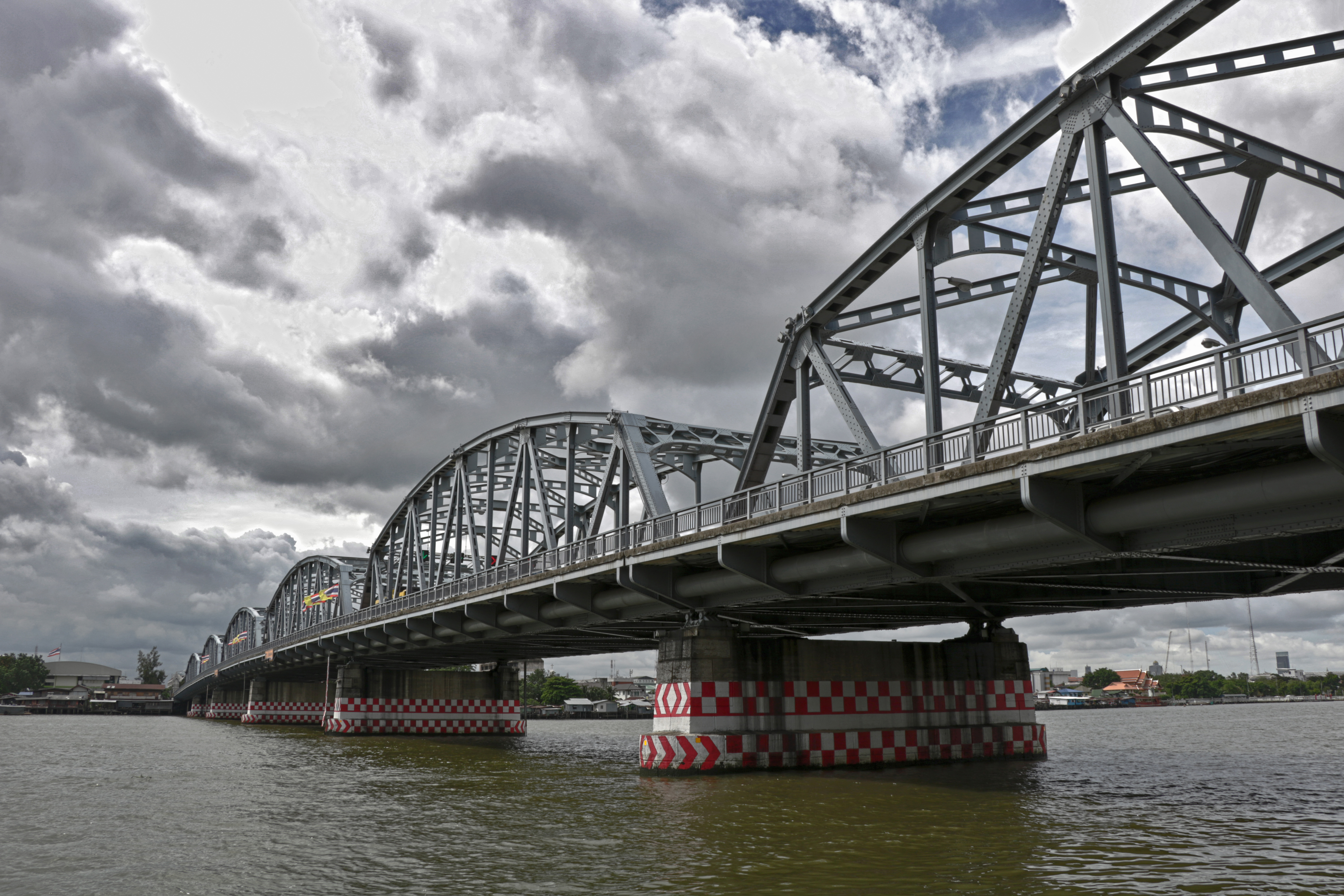
- Coordinates: 13.780892°N 100.502951°E
- Carries: 4 lanes of roadway, pedestrians
- Crosses: Chao Phraya River
- Locale: Bangkok, Thailand
- Official name: Krung Thon Bridge
- Other name: Sang Hi Bridge
- Preceded by: Rama VI Bridge
- Followed by: Rama VIII Bridge

Characteristics
- Total length: 648.90 m
- Longest span: 64 m
- Clearance below: 7.5 m

History
- Construction start: 31 August 1954
- Construction end: Late 1957
- Opened: 7 March 1958

Location
- Interactive map of Krung Thon Bridge

Krung Thon Bridge (Thai: สะพานกรุงธน, RTGS: Saphan Krung Thon, pronounced [sā.pʰāːn krūŋ tʰōn]) is a bridge over the Chao Phraya River in Bangkok, in Thailand, connecting the districts Dusit and Bang Phlat. The bridge has 6 spans, and consists of a steel superstructure resting on concrete piers.

== History ==
Construction on the bridge began on August 31, 1954, by the Japanese company Fuji Car Manufacturing Co., Ltd., with Sahawitsawa Kan Yotha Co., Ltd. as its local representative. A cornerstone ceremony was held on June 24, 1955. Construction was completed in late 1957, and the bridge was first opened to traffic on March 7, 1958. It was constructed to relieve traffic on Memorial Bridge, and cost 24,837,500 baht.

Krung Thong Bridge has been known to locals as Sang Hi Bridge (Thai: สะพานซังฮี้, Saphan Sang Hi) since construction began, before it was officially christened, because it extends from Ratchawithi Road, formerly named Sang Hi Road.

The opening of the bridge in 1958 greatly facilitated travel between the Thonburi and Phra Nakhon (city core) sides, making commuting much easier, and the ferry service from Bang O, on the Thonburi side, to Bang Krabue, on the Phra Nakhon side (which had been in operation since the reign of King Rama V) gradually declined and was eventually discontinued.

== Dimensions ==
The length of the bridge alone is 366.20 metres, with a 185.50 metre approach on the east side of the river, and a 97.20 metre approach on the west, for a total length of 648.90 metres. At its central point, the bridge is 7.5 metres above mean sea level.

The bridge has four lanes for motor vehicle traffic, two in each direction, with no divider. Pedestrian paths 2.5 metres wide run along either side of the bridge.

At the Thonburi or Bang Phlat side of the bridge, the Krung Thon Bridge Pier (designated N16) serves the Chao Phraya Express Boat. It is accessible via the MRT Blue Line, with Sirindhorn Station located approximately 3.7 kilometres away.

This pier has been temporarily closed since October 10, 2024, due to high water levels, as announced by the Marine Department, the agency responsible for overseeing water transportation.

== Gallery ==
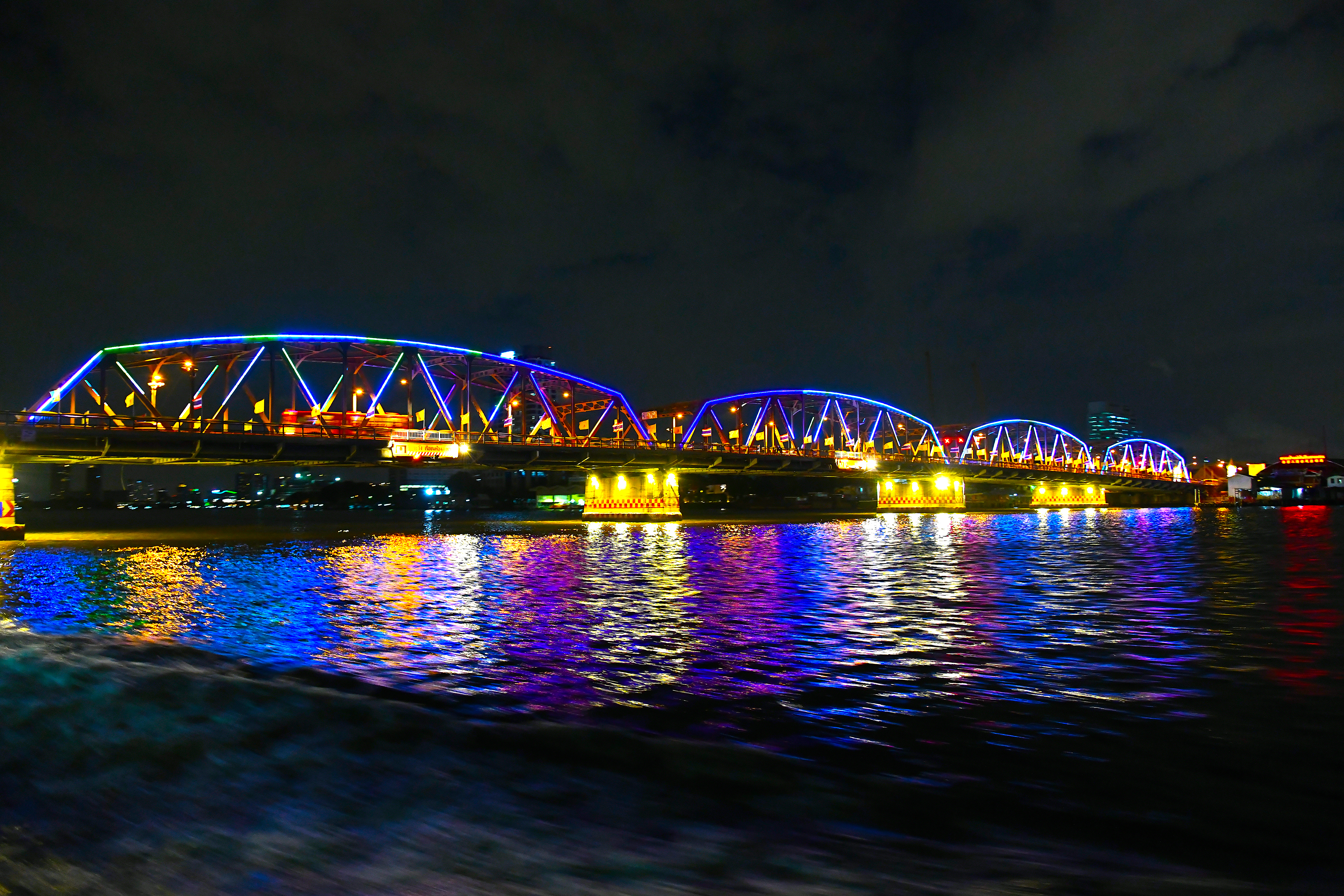

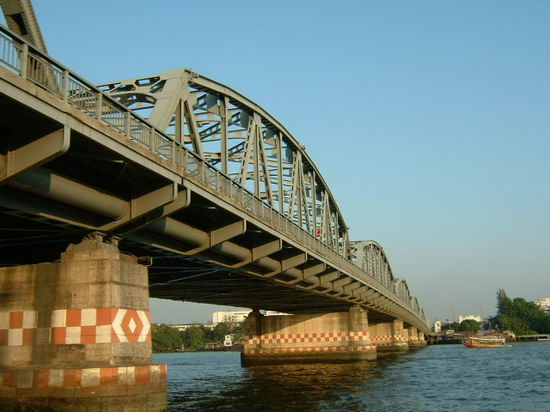

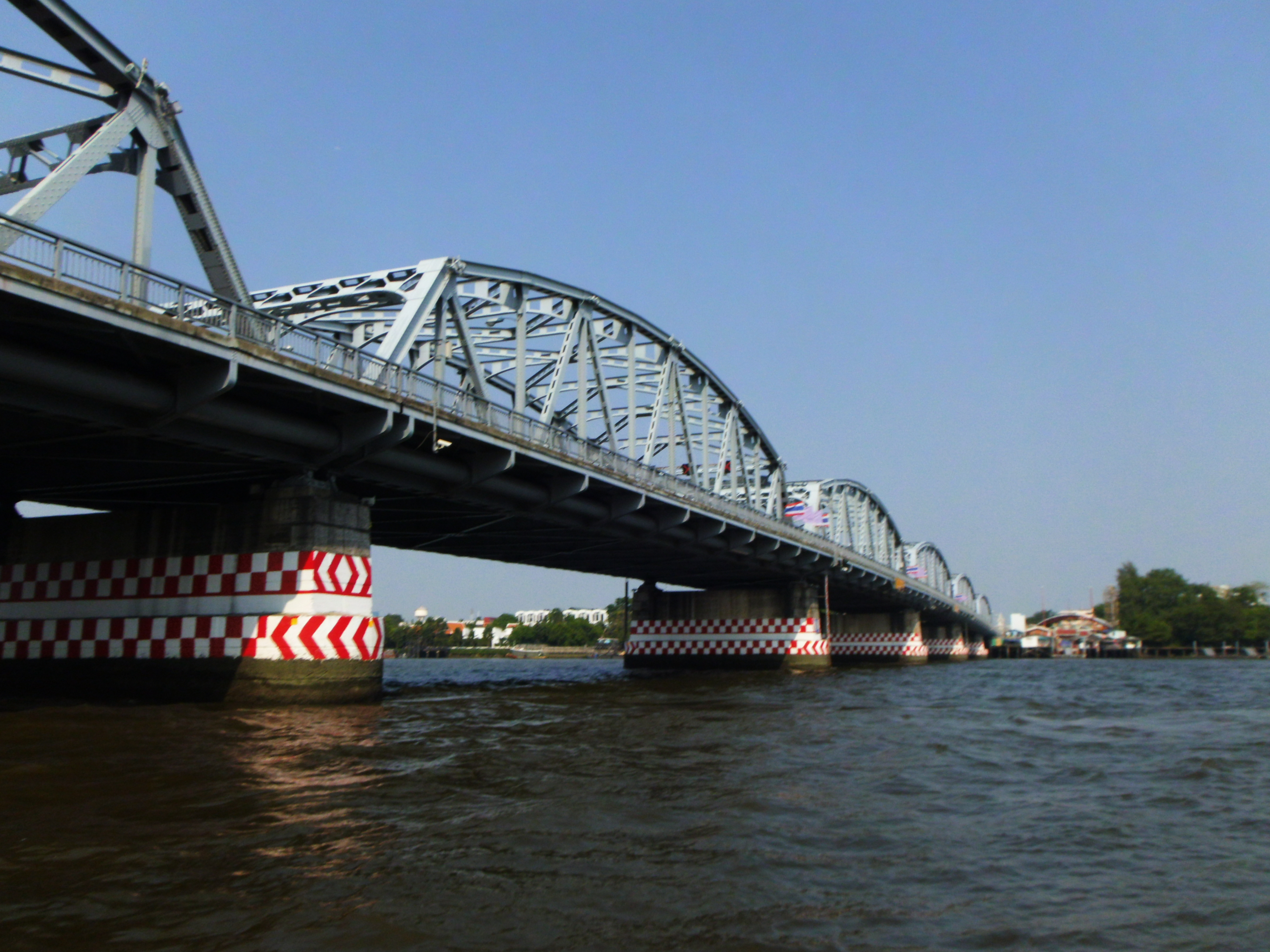

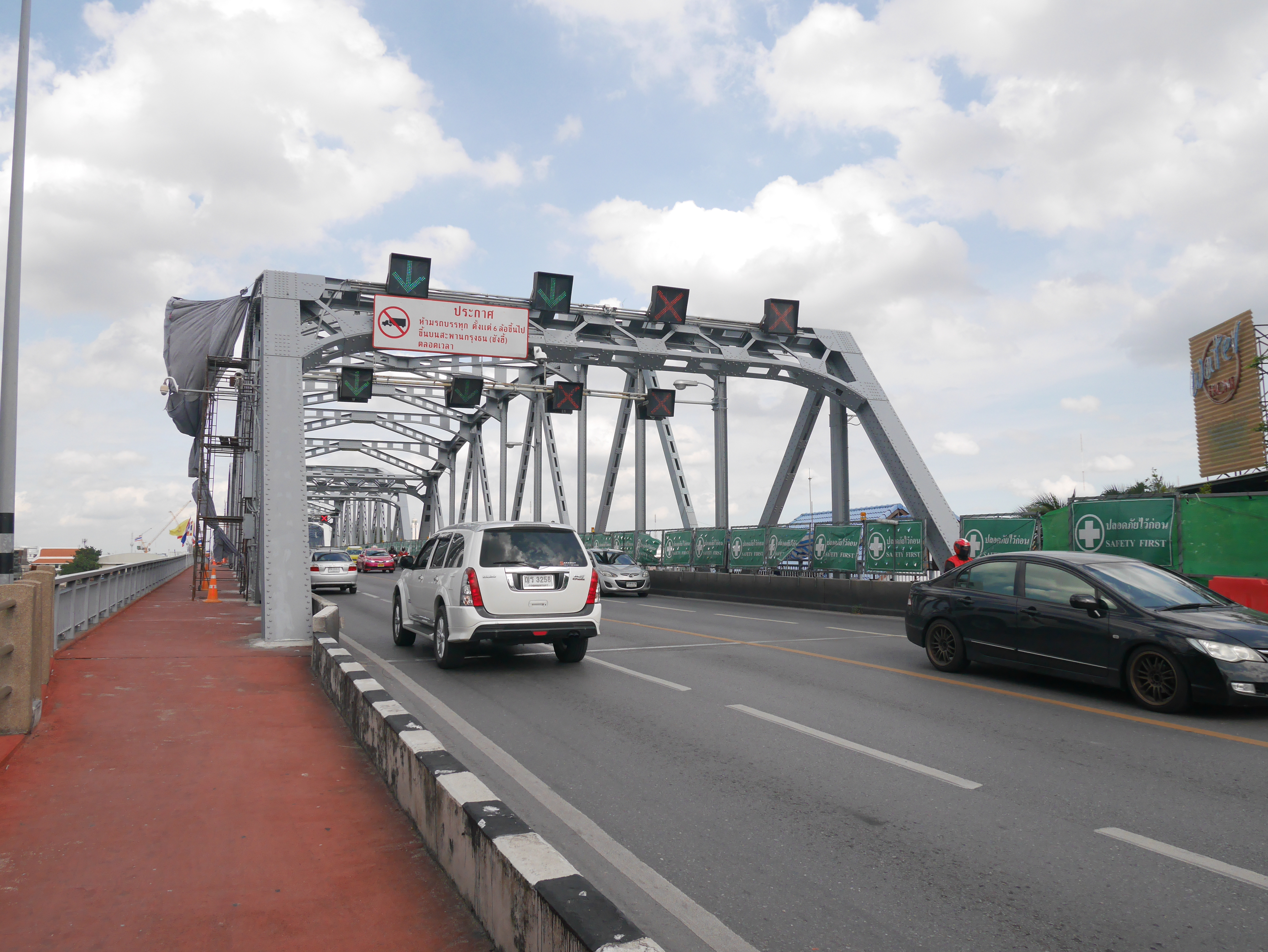
