= Shangri-La Hotel, Bangkok =

Shangri-La Bangkok
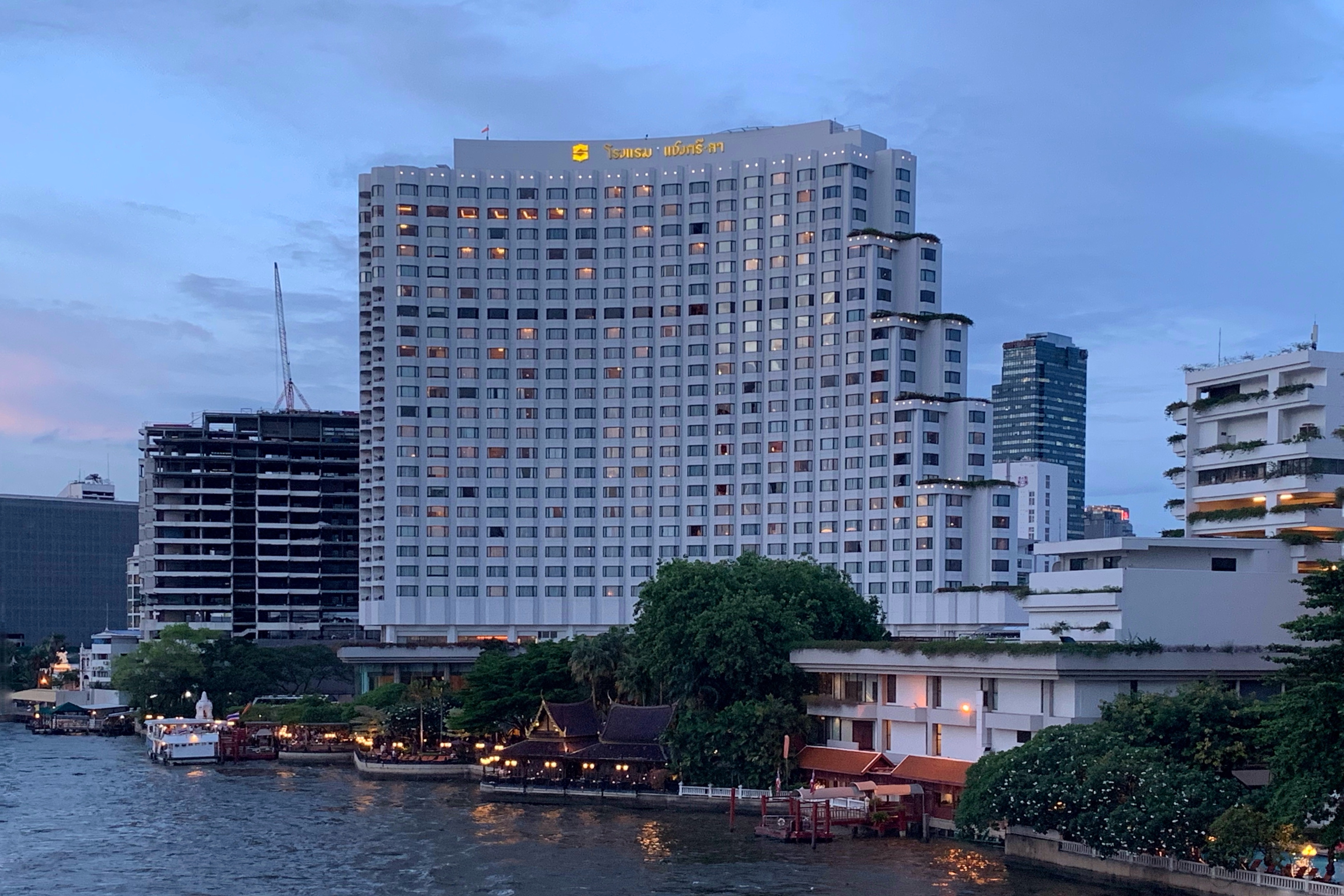
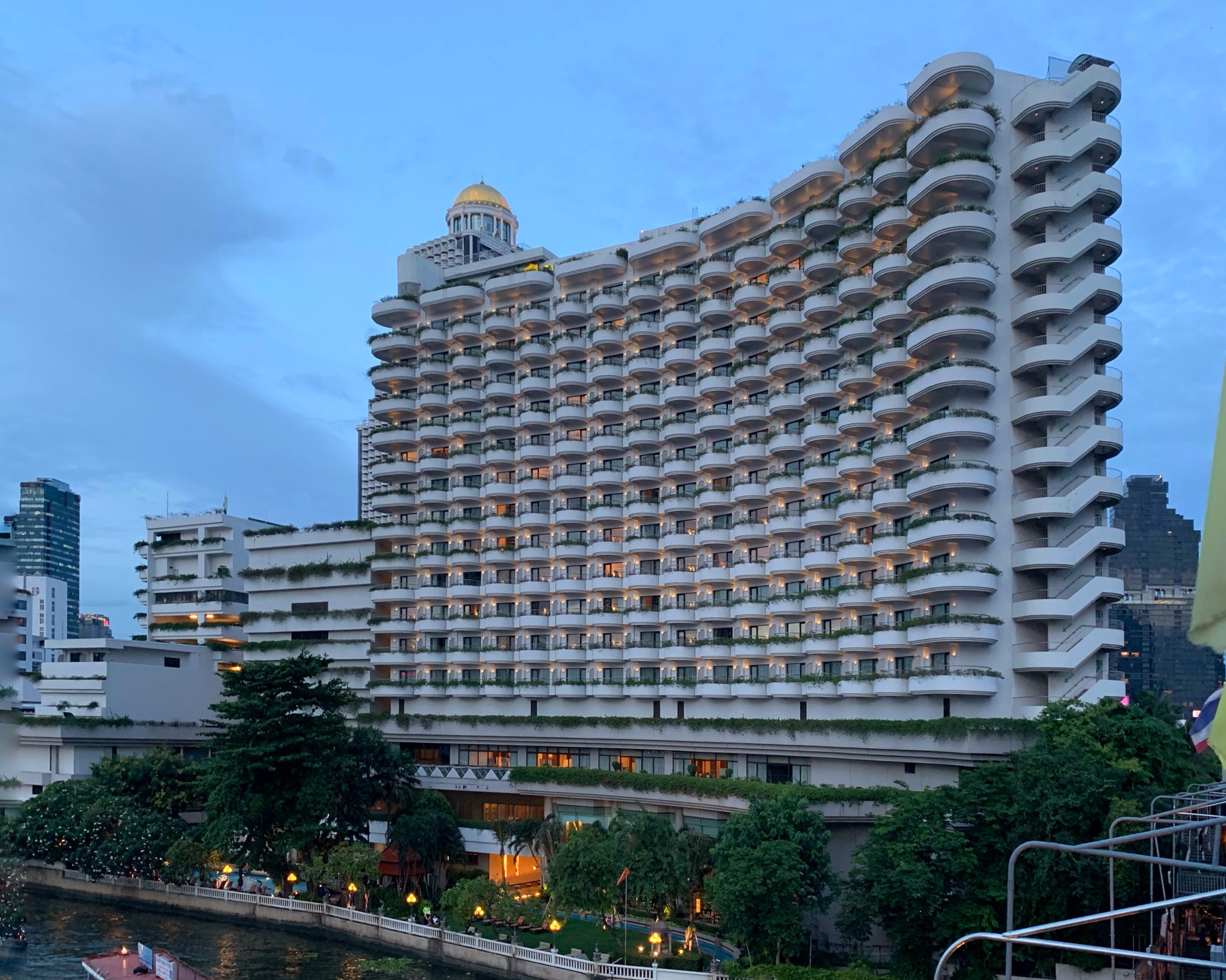
- The 2 wings of Shangri-La Hotel, Bangkok by the Chao Phraya River

General information
- Status: Completed
- Type: Hotel
- Location: 89 Soi Wat Suan Phlu, Charoen Krung Road, Bangrak, Bangkok, 10500, Thailand
- Coordinates: 13°43′16″N 100°30′50″E
- Opening: August 3, 1986
- Owner: Shangri-La Hotel Public Company Limited
- Operator: Elaine Yue

Design and construction
- Architect: Kanko Kikaku Sekkisha

Other information
- Number of rooms: 802

Website
- Shangri-La Hotel, Bangkok

Shangri-La Bangkok is a 5-star resort hotel owned by Shangri-La Hotels and Resorts, located on the banks of the Chao Phraya River in Bangkok, Thailand. With a quarter of a mile of river frontage, the two towers of the property face the Saphan Taksin BTS Station.

In 2014, the hotel joined the Bangkok Riverside Marketing Partnership (BRMP), a group of eight five-star hotels on Bangkok's riverside with a pledged 150 billion baht in investment in the area in January 2015.

The Shangri-La Hotel, Bangkok was used for the ASEAN summit 2015 hosted by Prime Minister Prayut Chan-o-cha, and by Aung San Suu Kyi and Wen Jiabao.

== History ==
The hotel initially opened in 1986 as one building, now known as the Shangri-La Wing, before adding the second Krungthep Wing in August 1991. All the hotel's facilities remain in the 25-storey Shangri-La Wing, with 673 rooms there, and 129 in the Krungthep Wing, named after the local name for Bangkok.

In its opening year, the hotel worked with the Mandarin Oriental Hotel and Royal Orchid Sheraton to boost tourism, which saw an increase in the number of events held in the city from the US, Europe, and Australia.

The hotel went through a US$17 million renovation in 2001–2002, including its guest rooms, lobby, restaurant, entrance, and spa as part of a wider US$130 million investment in the region, that included the Shangri-La Kuala Lumpur, the Makati Shangri-La, Manila, the China World Hotel, Beijing and the Kowloon Shangri-La, Hong Kong.

Between late 2007 and 2010, the hotel was renovated again at a cost of US$60 million. This included all public spaces with a design change that aimed to blend contemporary elements with a more traditional Thai design.”

In 2014, the hotel formed a business group with seven other five-star riverside hotels in Bangkok called the Bangkok Riverside Marketing Partnership (BRMP). Those seven hotels are the Anantara Bangkok Riverside & Spa, Chatrium Hotel Riverside Bangkok, Mandarin Oriental Bangkok, Millennium Hilton Bangkok, The Peninsula Bangkok, Ramada Plaza Bangkok Menam Riverside, and Royal Orchid Sheraton Hotel & Towers.

In 2015, the group pledged an investment of 150 billion baht.

== Design and construction ==
The hotel's design was based on the valley depicted in James Hilton's 1933 novel, Lost Horizon.

It was built by the Japanese architect firm Kanko Kikaku Sekkeisha (KKS Tokyo) on a site of 25,000 square meters, with 25 floors and one basement level. It initially opened with 716 rooms over a total of 77,610 sq.m. floor space.

Leese Robertson Freeman Designers developed the interior of the hotel and oversaw the 2001–02 renovation at a cost of US$17 million. Public spaces and rooms were designed by Wilson & Associates, including the colonnaded marble-floored lobby featuring the work “Golden Shangri-La” by Thai sculptor Thongchai Srisukprasert based on author James Hilton's concept of “a harmonious place where all of the elements are aligned.” The landscape design was created by Bill Bensley of Bangkok-based Bensley Design Studio.

== Features ==
=== Rooms and suites ===
Shangri-La Hotel, Bangkok, comprises 802 guestrooms in the two adjacent towers, the Shangri-La Wing and Krungthep Wing. The rooms are decorated with classic Thai style designed by Wilson & Associates, include elm burlwood paneling and carved Thai motifs.

=== Restaurants ===
Restaurants within the hotel include Angelini, the Horizon Cruise private riverboat on Chao Phraya River, the market-style NEXT2 Cafe designed by Tokyo's Super Potato, Salathip, and Shang Palace.

- Angelini - Italian

Angelini opened in 1995 as one of the first high-end Italian restaurants in Bangkok, the two-story Angelini was designed by Baldauf Catton von Eckartsberg Architects of California. Run by Chef Omar Ugoletti of Marche in central Italy, formerly of London's Bertarelli Restaurant and Hong Kong's Michelin 3-star Mezzo Bombana.

- Salathip - Thai

Chef de Cuisine at the Salathip is Tussanee Putkaew, a graduate of food and nutrition from Bangkok Technical College who has overseen the restaurant since 2004 and who grew up in the southern province of Chumphon. The restaurant is designed by Bensley Design Studios.

- Shang Palace - Cantonese

Opened with the hotel in 1986, Shang Palace underwent a 120 million baht renovation in 2013. The 300-seat Shang Palace is now run by Hong Kong native Sham Yun Ming.

== Media Reviews ==
The hotel was described by CNN as providing “quintessential Thai touches, including silk and teak finishings.”
