= Chao Phraya Express Boat =

Thai transport service

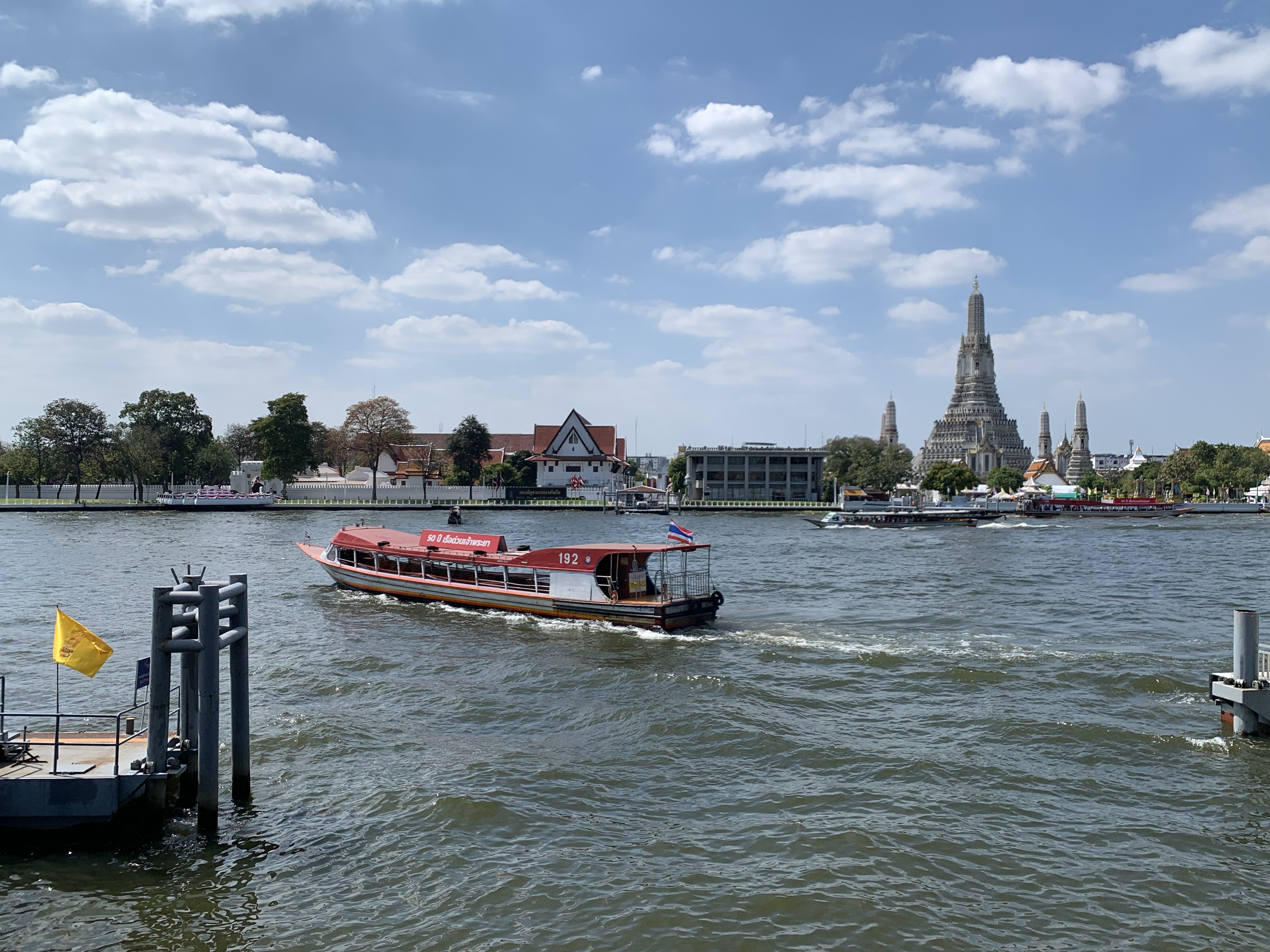
- A Chao Phraya Express Boat on the Chao Phraya, Wat Arun is visible in the background
- Locale: Thailand Bangkok Nonthaburi
- Waterway: Chao Phraya
- Transit type: express boat, catamaran air-conditioned express boat
- Line: Orange Nonthaburi–Wat Rajsingkorn; Yellow Nonthaburi–Sathorn Pier; GreenYellow Pakkert–Sathorn Pier; Red Nonthaburi–Sathorn Pier; Blue Tourist Boat Phra Arthit–Asiatic Pier; Chao phraya Boat non-flag (Out of service)
- Owner: Supattra Group
- Operator: Chaophrayaexpressboat.Co., Ltd
- Authority: Marine Department Bangkok Metropolitan Administration
- Began operation: 1971
- System length: 19.88mi (32km)
- No. of lines: 5 Route
- No. of vessels: 65
- Hubs: Sathorn Pier
- No. of terminals: 38 Pier

The Chao Phraya Express Boat (Thai: เรือด่วนเจ้าพระยา Ruea Duan Chao Phraya) is a transportation service in Thailand operating on the Chao Phraya River. It provides riverine express transportation between stops in the capital city of Bangkok and to Nonthaburi, the province immediately to the north. Established in 1971, the Chao Phraya Express Boat Company serves both local commuters and tourists. It also offers special tourist boats and a weekend river boat tours, as well as offering boats available for charter. Along with BTS Skytrain and Bangkok MRT, using the boats allows commuters to avoid traffic jams during the peak hours on weekdays. The 21 km (13 mi) route is served by 65 boats and operates from 06:00–21:30 (last departure from CEN-Sathorn pier of a yellow flagged boat) on weekdays and from 06:00–18:40 on weekends and holidays. Current prices are from THB10 (Local line for distance within one zone) to THB32 (for green-yellow flag trip on its entire route from Pakkret to Sathon), depending on the type of boat and the distance travelled. The river boats carry an average of about 40,000 passengers per day.

== Boats ==
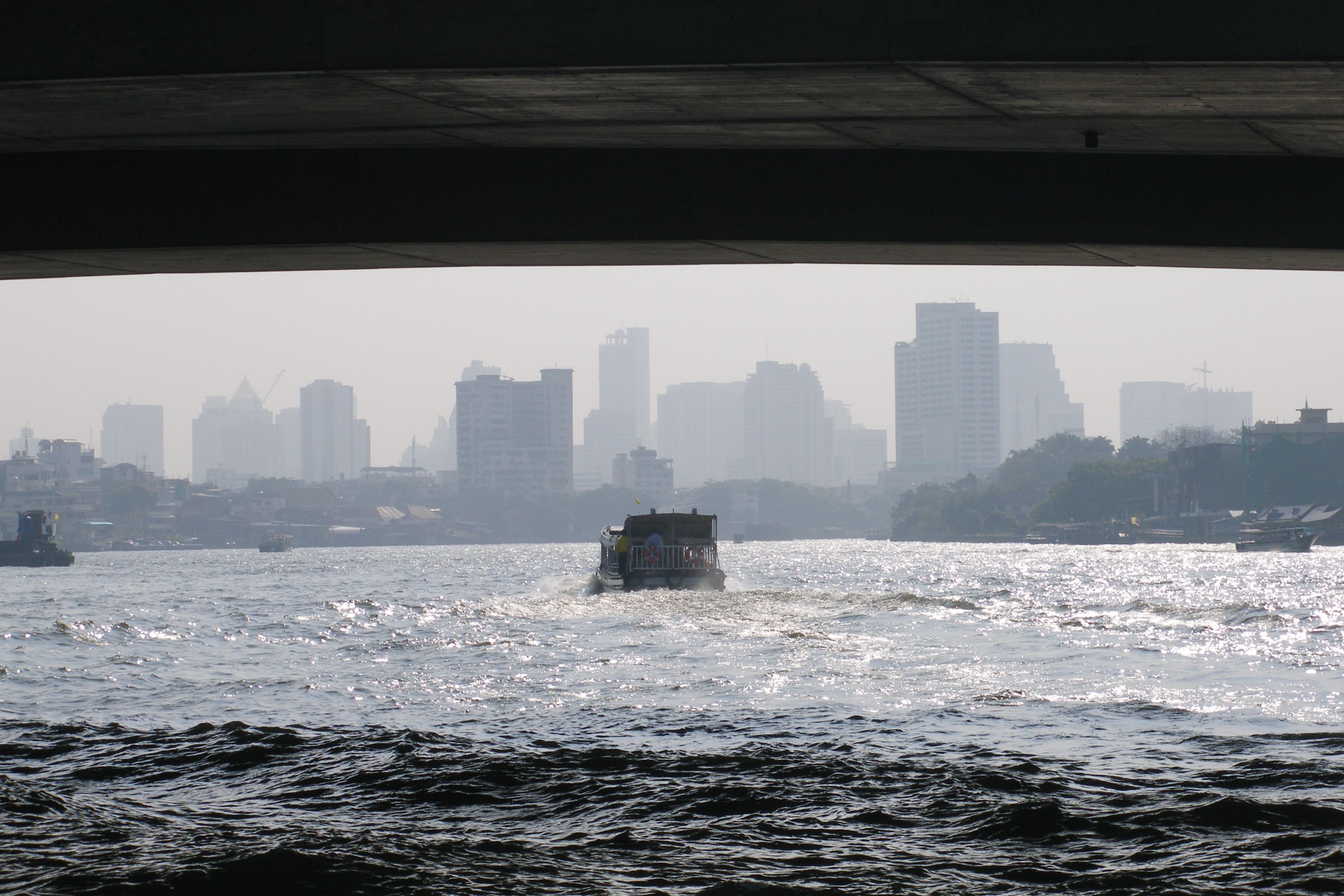
Express Boat on Chao Phraya River

Chao Phraya Express boats operates mainly two types of boats; all of them are built mainly out of wood.

Single-screw boat: ORANGE Yellow GreenYellow They are able to hold around 90-120 passengers at a time and are around 26–32 m (85–105 ft) long and about 2.7 m (8 ft 10 in) wide. The area on the back of the boat (floor painted yellow) is normally restricted to embarking and disembarking passengers, but some people like to stand there when the boat is highly crowded. There are two 2-step stairs on each side of the boat connecting the yellow pad on the back to the passenger area inside the boat, while in between those stairs is a non-functioning on-board toilet. The engine room, in the appearance of a large wooden box, is inboard in the center line of the boat in front of the seating area. There are two rows of seats on the left and another two on the right and an aisle passing in the middle. On the newer boats, the roof from over the engine room to the middle section of the boat is raised for extra headroom because most standing passengers on crowded boats are standing there. This design has been applied to all other boats that are being built in the company's shipyards in Bangkok and Ayutthaya. These types of boats operate on all non-flagged, orange-flagged and green-yellow-flagged boats, but also off-peak direction trips of yellow-flagged boats. The fleet has about 50 boats of this type.

Twin-screw boat or "super size" boat: ORANGE Yellow This type of boat holds around 120 to 180 passengers. Unlike the single-screw boat, the boat driver sits in a small pod above the passenger deck, similar to a cockpit on board a Boeing 747 airliner, giving view for passenger in the front-most row and public access to the boat's front deck for passengers who desire to watch the view from the boat's front without any obstruction (except for the Thai national flag). It is about 30–40 m (98–131 ft) long and about 5–7 m (16–23 ft) wide. Unlike a single-screw boat, its seating area stretches over the entire boat, while most seating is in front of engines. The engine rooms are placed lower than those in single-screw boats, and some passengers prefer to sit on them when it is crowded. There are 8 seats behind each engine. There are two aisles in the seating area in front of the engines and 3 aisles behind the engines. There are two toilets, one on the port and another one on the starboard, located in front of the engines. This type of boat serves as yellow flagged express boat in peak hours, and serves as tourist boats in off-peak hours. The fleet has about 15 boats of this type.

- Monohull Boat BLUE Tourist boat
- Catamaran boat BLUE Tourist boat
- Catamaran air condition boat RED BLUE Tourist boat

All seats on board all boats have individual life jackets and there are lifebuoys around the boat that can be used in case of an emergency.

27 electric boats are under construction for the service.

== Piers ==
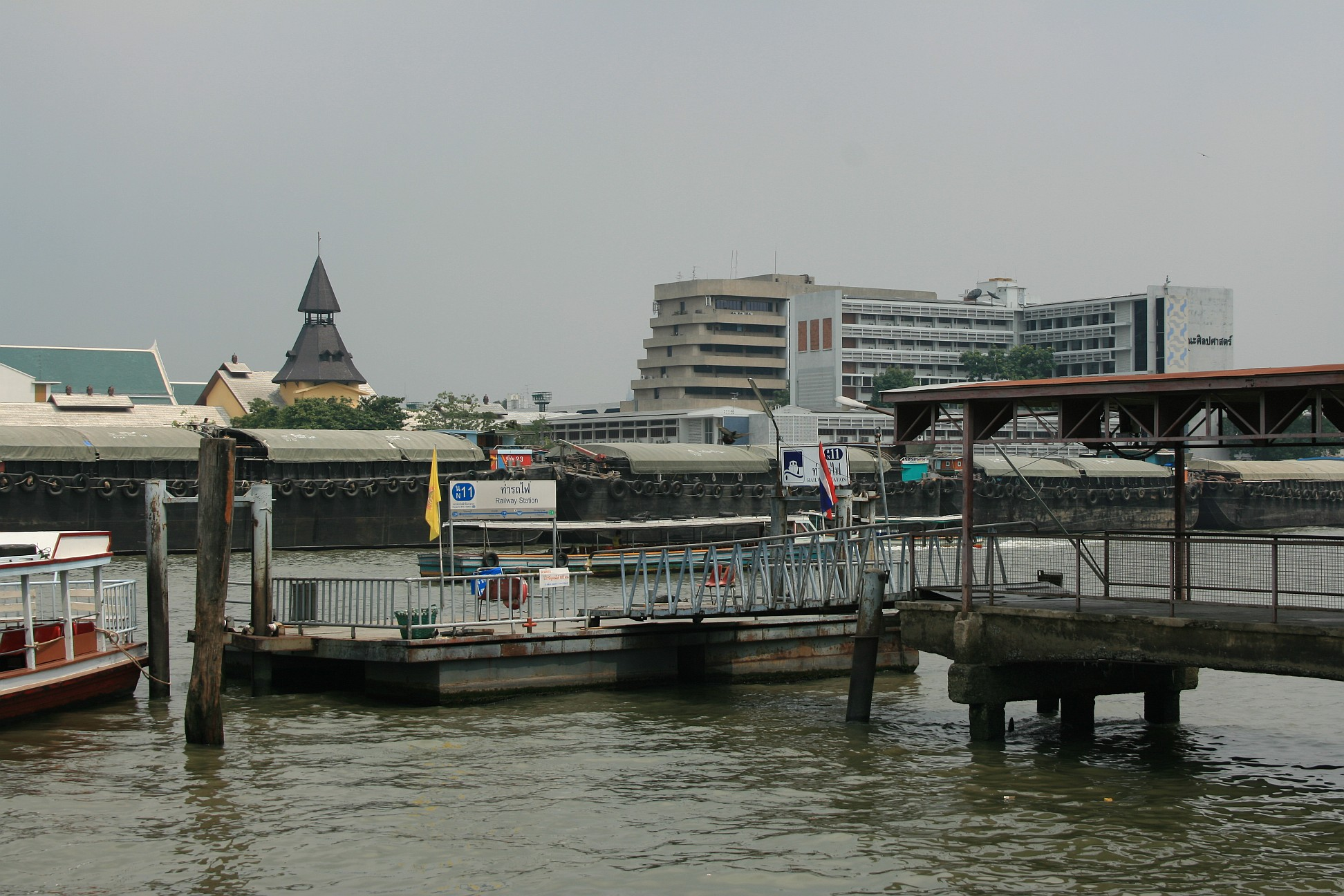
Railway Pier (N11)

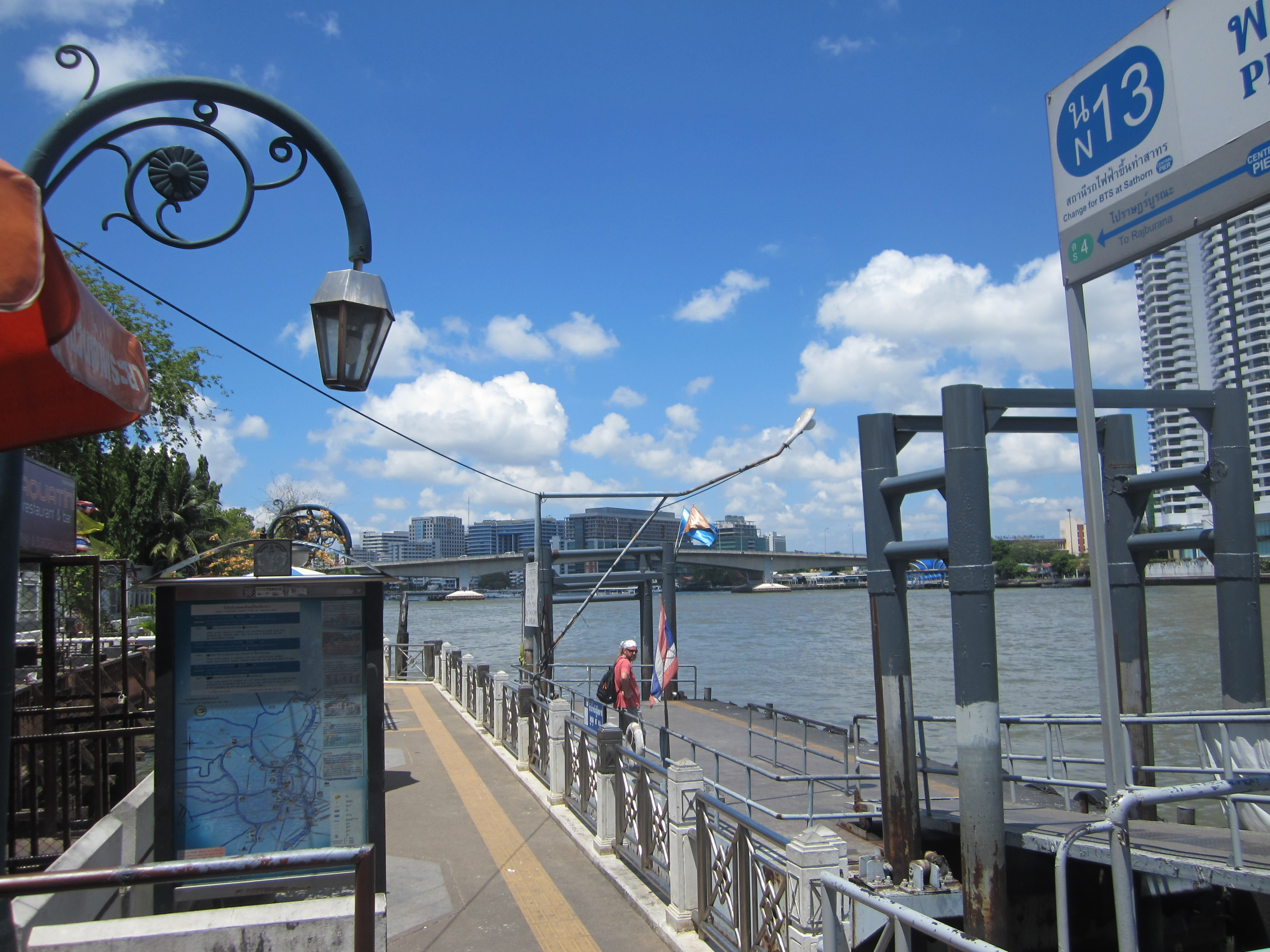
Phra Arthit Pier (N13) Siriraj Hospital is ahead

Pier			Services					Transfers	Location
Pier						No flag		Transfers	Location
N33	Pakkret	ปากเกร็ด			●				Nonthaburi
N32	Wat Klangkret	วัดกลางเกร็ด			●				Nonthaburi
N31/1	Baan Pak Tiwanon	บ้านพักข้าราชบริพารติวานนท์			●				Nonthaburi
N31	Ministry of Commerce	กระทรวงพาณิชย์			●				Nonthaburi
N30/1	Phra Nang Klao Bridge	สะพานพระนั่งเกล้า			●			MRT Phra Nang Klao Bridge Station	Nonthaburi
N30	Nonthaburi (Pibul 3)	นนทบุรี (พิบูลย์สงคราม 3)	●	●	●	●			Nonthaburi
N29/1	Rama V Bridge	พระราม 5	●	｜	●	●			Nonthaburi
N29	Pibul 2	พิบูลย์สงคราม 2	｜	｜	｜	●			Nonthaburi
N28	Wat Kien	วัดเขียน	●	｜	｜	●			Nonthaburi
N27	Wat Tuek	วัดตึก	●	｜	｜	●			Nonthaburi
N26	Wat Khema	วัดเขมา	●	｜	｜	●			Nonthaburi
N25	Pibul 1	พิบูลย์สงคราม 1	｜	｜	｜	●			Nonthaburi
N24	Rama VII Bridge	พระราม 7	●	●	●	●			
N23	Wat Soi Thong	วัดสร้อยทอง	●	｜	｜	●			Bangkok
N22	Bang Po	บางโพ	●	●	●	●		MRT; Bang Pho Station	Bangkok
N21	Kiak Kai	เกียกกาย	●	●	●	●			Bangkok
N20	Kheaw Khai Ka	เขียวไข่กา	●	｜	｜	●			Bangkok
N19	Irrigation Dept.	กรมชลประทาน	｜	｜	｜	●			Bangkok
N18	Payap	พายัพ	●	●	●	●			Bangkok
N17/1	Wat Thepakorn	วัดเทพากร	｜	｜	｜	●			Bangkok
N17	Wat Thepnahree	วัดเทพนารี	｜	｜	｜	●			Bangkok
N16	Krung Thon Bridge	สะพานกรุงธน (ซังฮี้)	●	｜		●			Bangkok
N15	Thewet	เทเวศร์	●	●	●	●		Phadung Krung Kasem boat	Bangkok
N14	Rama VIII Bridge	พระราม 8	｜	｜	｜	●			Bangkok
N13	Phra Arthit	พระอาทิตย์	●	｜	｜	●	●		Bangkok
N12	Phra Pin Klao Bridge	พระปิ่นเกล้า	●	●	●	●	｜		Bangkok
N11	Thonburi Railway	ท่ารถไฟ	●	●	●	●	｜		Bangkok
N10	Wang Lang (Prannok)	วังหลัง (พรานนก)	●	●	●	●	●		Bangkok
N9	Tha Chang	ท่าช้าง	●	｜	●	●	●		Bangkok
N8	Tha Tien	ท่าเตียน	●	｜	｜	｜	｜		Bangkok
N7/1	Wat Arun	วัดอรุณ	｜	｜	｜	●	｜		Bangkok
N7	Rajinee	ราชินี	｜	｜	｜	●	｜	MRT; Sanam Chai Station	Bangkok
N6/1	Yodpiman	ยอดพิมาน	｜	｜	｜	｜	｜		Bangkok
N6	Memorial Bridge	สะพานพุทธ	●	｜	｜	●	｜		Bangkok
N5	Rachawongse	ราชวงศ์	●	●	●	●	●		Bangkok
N4	Marine Dept.	กรมเจ้าท่า	●	●	●	●	｜		Bangkok
N3	Si Phraya	สี่พระยา	●	●	●	●	●		Bangkok
N2	Wat Muang Kae	วัดม่วงแค	｜	｜	｜	●	｜		Bangkok
N2/1	ICONSIAM	ไอคอนสยาม	●	｜	｜	●	●	MRL Charoen Nakhon Station	Bangkok
N1	Oriental	โอเรียลเต็ล	●	｜	｜	●	｜		Bangkok
CEN	Sathorn (Taksin Bridge)	สาทร (ตากสิน)	●	●	●	●	●	BTS; Saphan Taksin Station	Bangkok
S1	Wat Sawetachat	วัดเศวตฉัตร	｜			●	｜		Bangkok
S2	Wat Worachanyawas	วัดวรรยาวาส	｜			●	｜		Bangkok
S3	Wat Rajsingkorn; Asiatique	วัดราชสิงขร เอเชียทีค	●			●	●		Bangkok
