= Saphan Taksin BTS station =

BTS skytrain station in Bangkok, Thailand

Saphan Taksin สะพานตากสิน
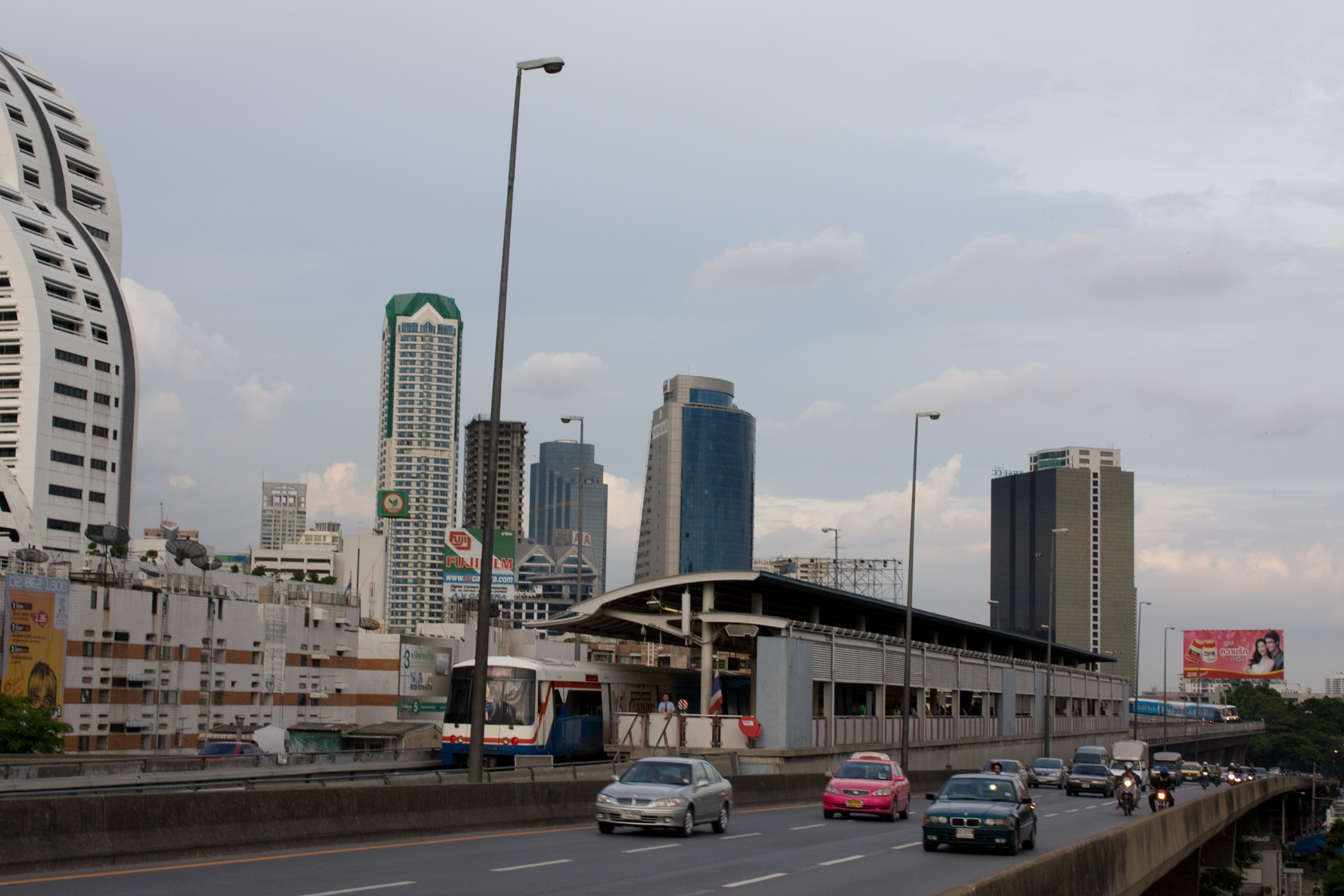

General information
- Location: Sathon and Bang Rak; Bangkok; Thailand
- Coordinates: 13°43′7.59″N 100°30′50.78″E
- Owner: Bangkok Metropolitan Administration (BMA); BTS Rail Mass Transit Growth Infrastructure Fund (BTSGIF)
- Operator: Bangkok Mass Transit System Public Company Limited (BTSC)
- Line: Silom Line
- Connections: Chao Phraya Express Boat

Construction
- Structure type: Elevated
- Accessible: -

Other information
- Station code: S6

History
- Opened: 5 December 1999; 26 years ago

Passengers
- 2021: 1,594,623

Services
Preceding station	BTS Skytrain	Following station
Surasak towards National Stadium	Silom Line	Krung Thon Buri towards Bang Wa
Location

Saphan Taksin station (Thai: สถานีสะพานตากสิน) is a BTS skytrain station, on the Silom Line in Sathon and Bang Rak Districts, Bangkok, Thailand. The station is located at the entry ramp of Taksin Bridge, below Sathon Road, to the east of the Chao Phraya River. It is the first rapid transit station in Bangkok with an interchange to ferry service along the Chao Phraya River, thus being popular for commuters and tourists travelling to the historical areas along the river, such as Wat Arun, Wat Pho and Sanam Luang.

The station has an unusual layout. Due to the station's location on the Taksin Bridge in the median between the two vehicular carriageways, there is only space for one platform and one track. Switches adjacent to the station allow trains from each direction to platform, but the configuration restricts capacity on the entire line. The station was initially conceived as a temporary terminus until the line was extended to Thonburi. Plans called for the closure and demolition of the station, allowing for a second track to be built, but the station's proximity to the Sathorn Pier and resulting prevented its closure.

The Bangkok Metropolitan Administration has planned to reconfigure the station after a reconstruction of the Taksin Bridge. The rebuilding would cost one billion baht with work to be completed in 40 months. However, the project has not yet commenced.

== Station layout ==
U3; Platform
U3; Platform	Platform 3	Silom Line toward Bang Wa (Krung Thon Buri) or National Stadium (Surasak)
U3; Platform	Side platform, doors will open on the left (southbound) / right (westbound)
U2 ticket sales class	ticket sales floor	Exit 1–4, Passenger Service Center; Ticket Office, Ticket Machine, Shop
G Street level	-	Saphan Taksin Park, Sathorn Pier, Charoen Krung Road

== Facilities ==
- Tourist information office
- Chao Phraya Express Boat service at Sathorn Pier
- Mine Smart Ferry service at Sathorn Pier
- Cross-river ferry to Pepsi Pier/Charoen Nakhon Road from Sathorn Pier
- Shuttle boat services to ICONSIAM from Sathorn Pier

== See also ==
- BTS Skytrain
- Taksin Bridge
