= Nonthaburi Pier =

Pier on the Chao Phraya River, Thailand

Coordinates: 13°50′31.8″N 100°29′27.4″E

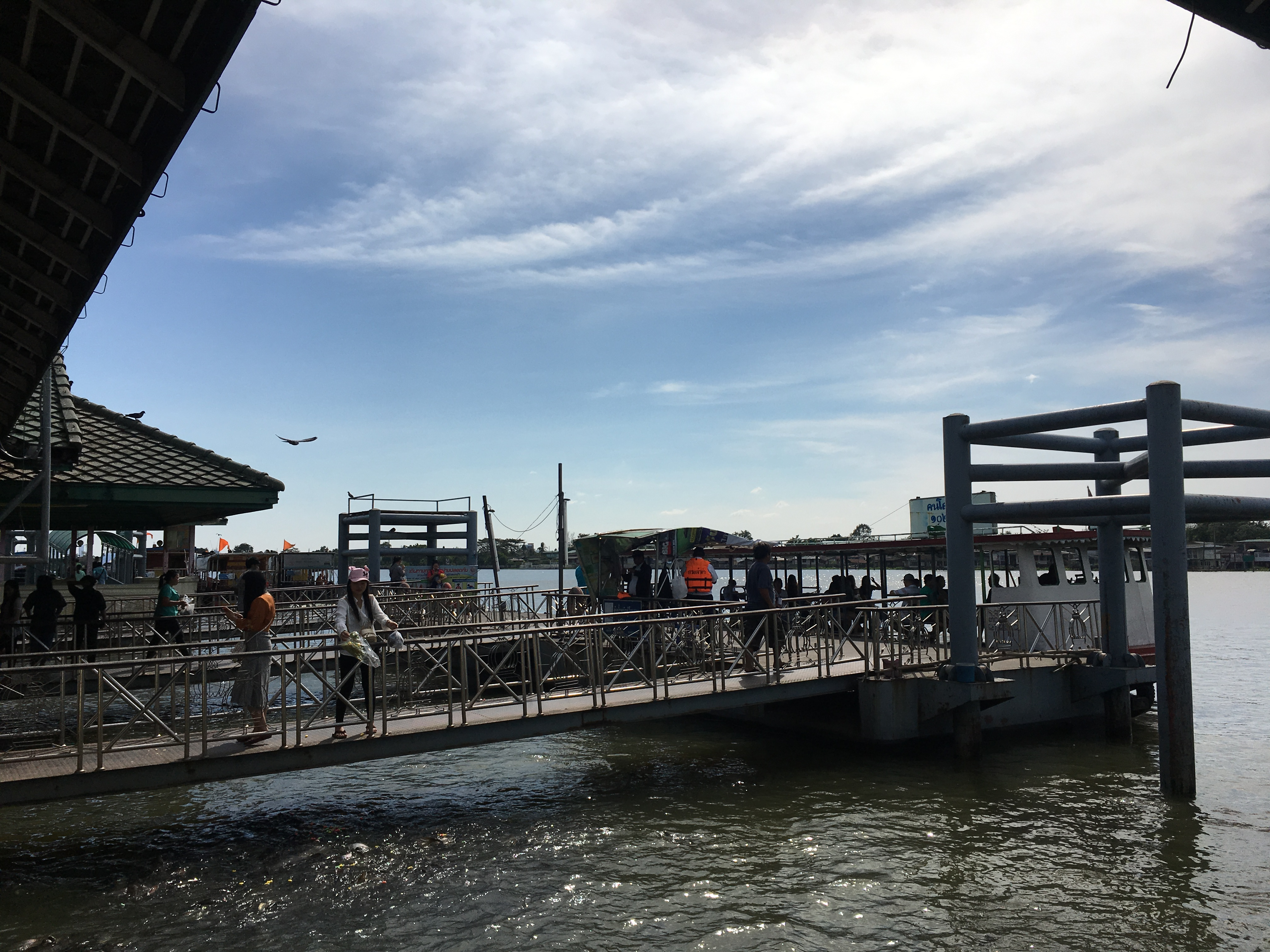
Nonthaburi Pier in late 2017

Nonthaburi Pier or Nonthaburi Pier (Pibul 3) (Thai: ท่าน้ำนนทบุรี, ท่าน้ำนนทบุรี (พิบูล 3); often called short: ท่าน้ำนนท์), with designated pier number N30, is a pier on Chao Phraya River located in the Tambon Suan Yai, Amphoe Mueang Nonthaburi, Nonthaburi Province, Thailand, considered as another main pier of Nonthaburi, apart from Pak Kret Pier.

== Description ==
It is the final stop for all Chao Phraya Express Boats, except the green-flag boat. A cross-river ferry service is also available to the Bang Si Mueang side of Nonthaburi.

The pier is situated next to the Nonthaburi Clock Tower and the Old Nonthaburi City Hall, a teak antique building dating back to the reign of King Rama VI. Today, it serves as a provincial museum and is registered as an ancient monument by the Fine Arts Department.

The surrounding area features restaurants, coffee shops, bakeries, banks, clothing stores, and a market. It also functions as a terminal for several bus routes.

In addition, the Chao Phraya River flows past the pier, making it a venue for the annual King's Cup Regatta held around mid-year.

== Transportation ==
- Chao Phraya Express Boat: all boat routes
- BMTA bus: routes 30 (2-4), 32 (2-5), 63 (2-10E), 65, 97 (2-15), 114 (1-21), 117 (2-47), 175 (2-22), 203, 367 (commuter bus), 506, 545, 6028 (commuter bus)
- Songthaew: route 1 (Circle route Nonthaburi - Sanambin Nam), 1 Kei truck (Nonthaburi pier - WAT Chomphu Wek), 3 (Nonthaburi pier - WAT Sangkathan-Bangphai Soi 5), 4 (Nonthaburi pier - WAT Bot bon), 5 (Nonthaburi pier - WAT Sai), 10 (Nonthaburi pier - Cluster Ville Ratchaphruek), 1024B Blue roof (Rama 5 - Bang bua thong), 1053 (Nonthaburi pier - WAT Salikho Phirataram), 6162 (Nonthaburi pier - WAT Chalo), 17002 (Soi Pracharat 26 Yak 1 - Central Rattanathibet)
