= San Chaopho Suea (Sao Chingcha) =

Chinese temple in Bangkok

Coordinates: 13°45′14.04″N 100°29′49.56″E

- San Chaopho Suea Phra Nakhon, San Chaopho Suea
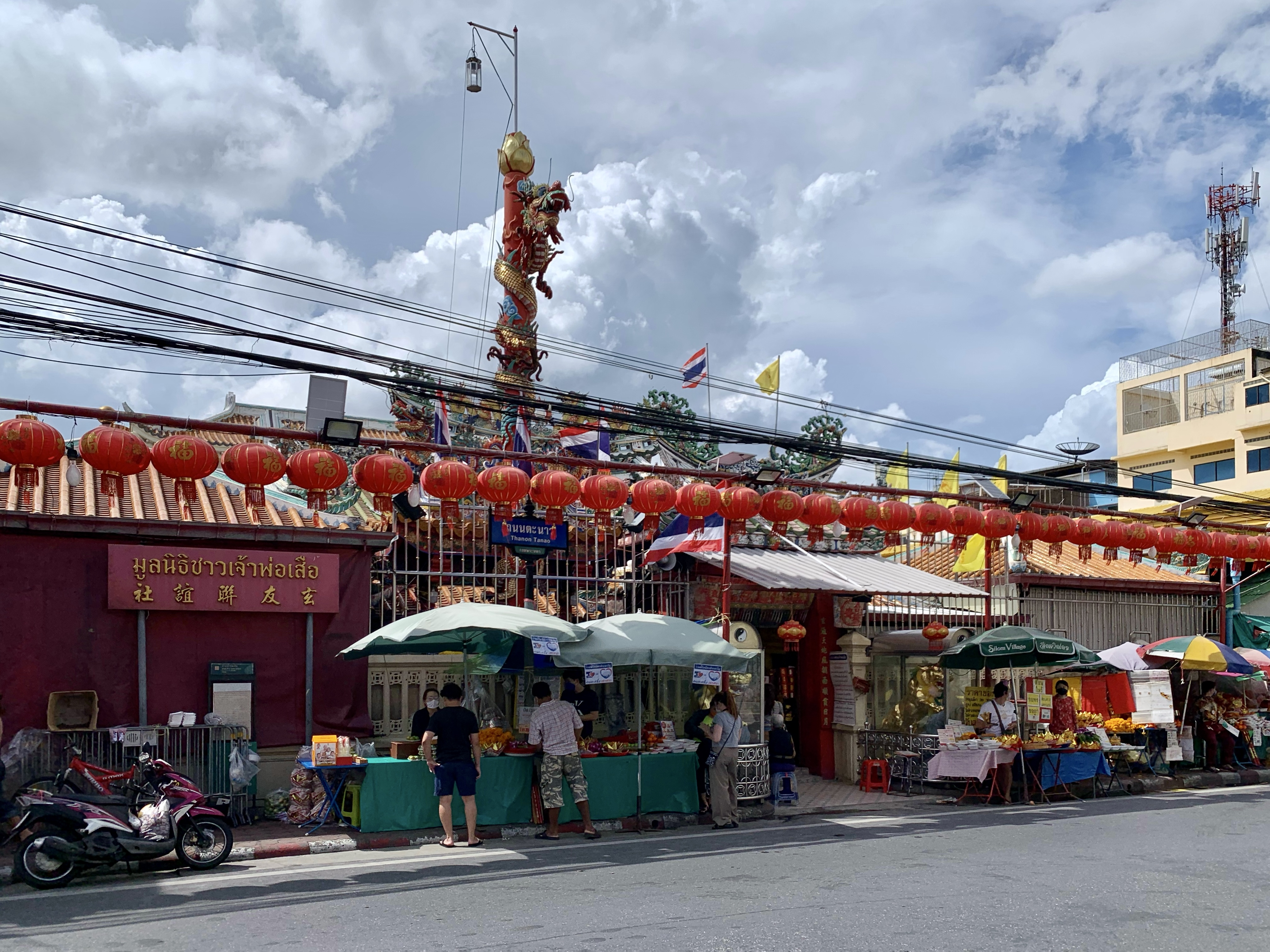
- In front of the shrine

- Location within Thailand

Religion
- Affiliation: Taoist, Buddhist
- Deity: Xuantian Shangdi

Location
- Location: 468 Tanao Road, San Chaopho Suea Sub-district, Phra Nakhon District, Bangkok
- Country: Thailand
- Interactive map of San Chaopho Suea (Sao Chingcha)

Architecture
- Founder: Teochew
- Completed: 1834; 192 years ago

San Chaopho Suea (Sao Chingcha) (Thai: ศาลเจ้าพ่อเสือ (เสาชิงช้า)) or San Chaopho Suea Phra Nakhon (ศาลเจ้าพ่อเสือพระนคร), usually known simply as San Chaopho Suea (ศาลเจ้าพ่อเสือ; simplified Chinese: 打恼路玄天上帝庙; traditional Chinese: 打惱路玄天上帝廟; pinyin: Dǎ nǎo lù xuán tiān shàngdì miào; commonly known in English as Tiger God Shrine) is a Chinese joss house located at 468 Tanao Road, San Chaopho Suea Sub-district, Phra Nakhon District in the old town Bangkok (Rattanakosin Island) near Sao Chingcha (Giant Swing) and Wat Mahannapharam with features the Southern Chinese architectural style. It is the shrine of Chaopho Suea (เจ้าพ่อเสือ, lit. 'Tiger God'), according to the ancient Chinese belief and it is one of the most respected Chinese shrines in Bangkok and Thailand alike Wat Mangkon Kamalawat in Chinatown, especially during the Chinese New Year.

This shrine was built in 1834 in the reign of King Nang Klao (Rama III). In the past, it was located on Bamrung Mueang Road but was relocated by the command of King Chulalongkorn (Rama V) to the Tanao Road, the present location. The shrine enshrined statues of Chinese Supreme Being, including the Tiger God (Xuan Tian Shang Di), Lord Guan (God of Honesty), Caishen (God of Fortune), Dai Seng Ya (Monkey God) and Mazu (Goddess of the Sea), which are highly venerated among both Thai and Chinese people.

At present, it has been promoted as one of the nine temples under the project "Respect to the Nine Temples" (ไหว้พระ 9 วัด) of Tourism Authority of Thailand (TAT) along with other temples are (Phra Nakhon side): Wat Phra Kaew, Wat Pho, Wat Chana Songkhram, Wat Suthat, City Pillar Shrine (Thonburi side): Wat Arun, Wat Rakhangkhositraram and Wat Kalayanamitr. It is now a recognised ancient monument of Bangkok since 1988.

== See more ==
other Chinese temples in Bangkok

- Wat Mangkon Kamalawat
- Leng Buai Ia Shrine
- Wat San Chao Chet
- Chao Mae Thapthim Shrine
- Poh Teck Tung Foundation
- Thian Fah Foundation
- Kian Un Keng Shrine
- Wat Dibayavari Vihara
