= Wat Chana Songkhram =

Buddhist temple in Bangkok, Thailand

- วัดชนะสงคราม
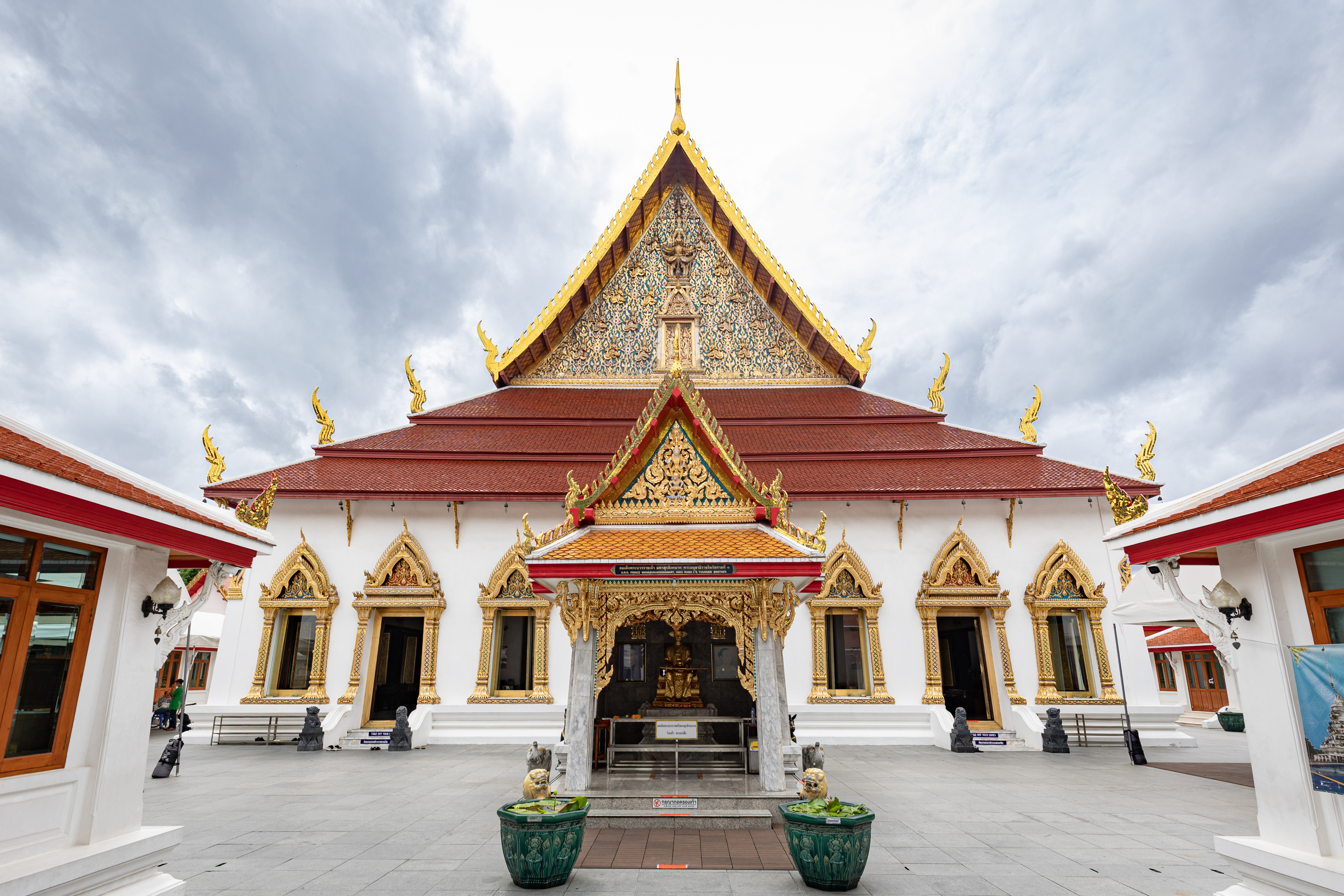
- In front of the temple

- Location within Bangkok

Religion
- Affiliation: Buddhism

Location
- Location: 77 Chakrabongse Road
- Country: Thailand
- Interactive map of Wat Chana Songkhram
- Coordinates: 13°45′37″N 100°29′41″E

Wat Chanasongkhram (Thai: วัดชนะสงครามราชวรมหาวิหาร), commonly shortened to Wat Chana Songkhram (Thai: วัดชนะสงคราม, pronounced [wát t͡ɕʰā.náʔ sǒŋ.kʰrāːm]), is a second-class royal monastery of ratchaworamahawihan status. It is located in Chana Songkram Sub-district, Phra Nakhon District, Bangkok, within the area of Bang Lamphu opposite Khaosan Road and adjacent to Rambuttri Road.

The temple is located at 77 Chakrabongse Road, it is an old monastery which was built before the first Rattanakosin period (before 1782). The former name is "Wat Klang Na" (วัดกลางนา; lit: temple in the middle of paddy field), later the reign of King Phutthayotfa Chulalok (Rama I), Prince Maha Sura Singhanat (the king younger brother) granted Mon people and monks to lived in the area, renovated the temple to be resident of Mon monks. Later, King Phutthayotfa Chulalok gave the new name "Wat Thong Pu" (วัดตองปุ), refers to name of a town in Myanmar after the name of Mon temple in Ayutthaya and Lopburi in the reign King Phutthayotfa Chulalok. The temple became a center of Mon sect of Buddhism as he awarded to Mon soldiers who formed major troop in war with Burmese. After the war, the temple was restored and made the royal monastery, and then renamed again to be "Wat Chana Songkhram" which means victory of war temple as Thai gained victory over Burmese for three times between 1785–87 (Nine Armies' Wars, Tha Din Daeng campaign and Sam Sop, battle at Nakorn Lampang Pasang).

Wat Chana Songkram is open for visitors or travelers every day, with no admission fee. It has been promoted as one of the nine temples under the campaign "Respect to the Nine Temples" (ไหว้พระ 9 วัด) by Tourism Authority of Thailand (TAT) along with other temples (Wat Phra Kaew, Wat Pho, Wat Suthat, City Pillar Shrine, San Chao Pho Suea (Phra Nakhon side), Wat Arun, Wat Rakhangkhositraram and Wat Kalayanamitr (Thonburi side)) for the auspicious of life.

== Gallery ==
Shrine at Front

A Viharn

A Stupa
