= Ram Buttri Road =

Street in Bangkok, Thailand

Coordinates: 13°45′36″N 100°29′49″E

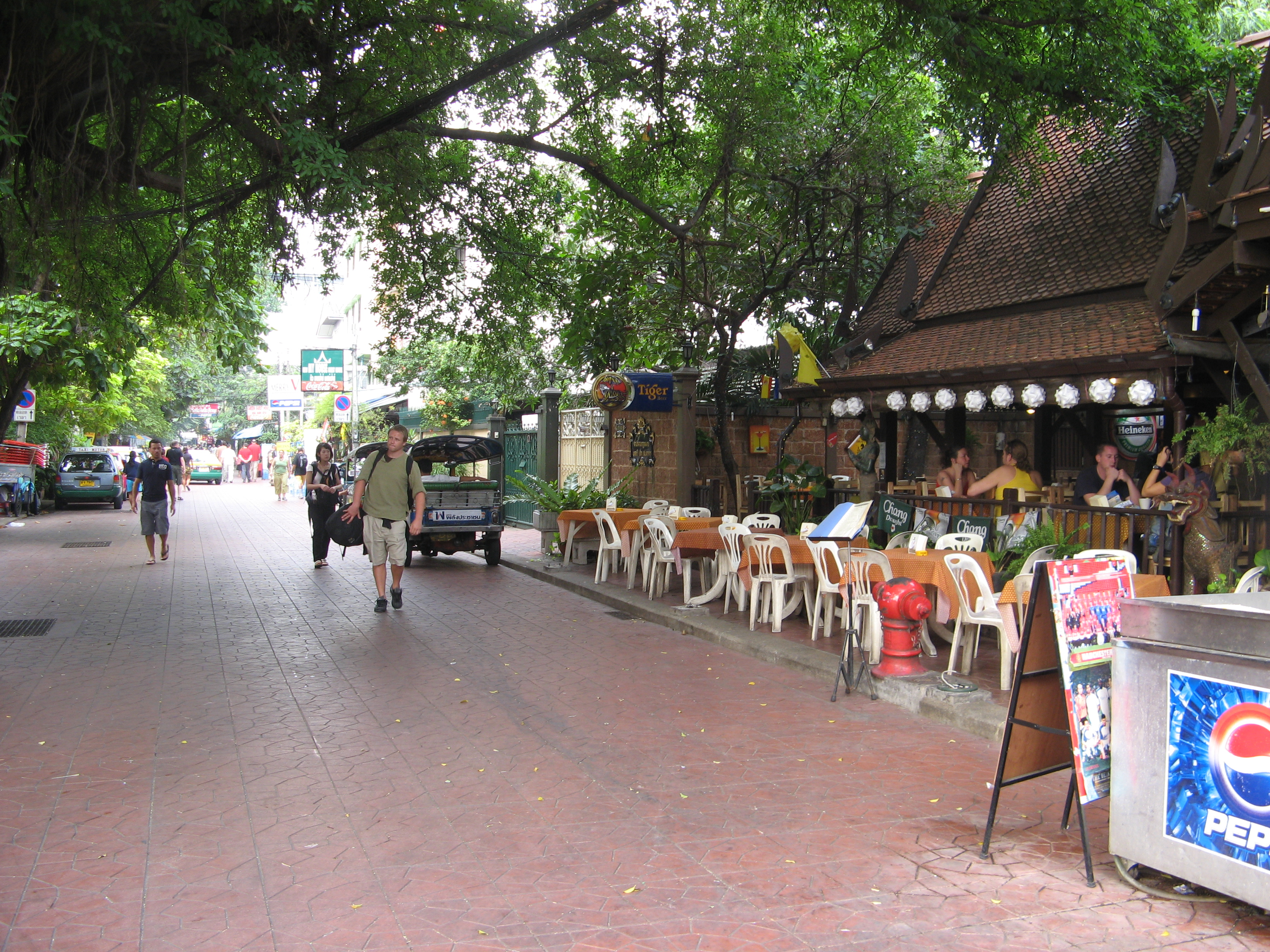
Ram Buttri Road during the day

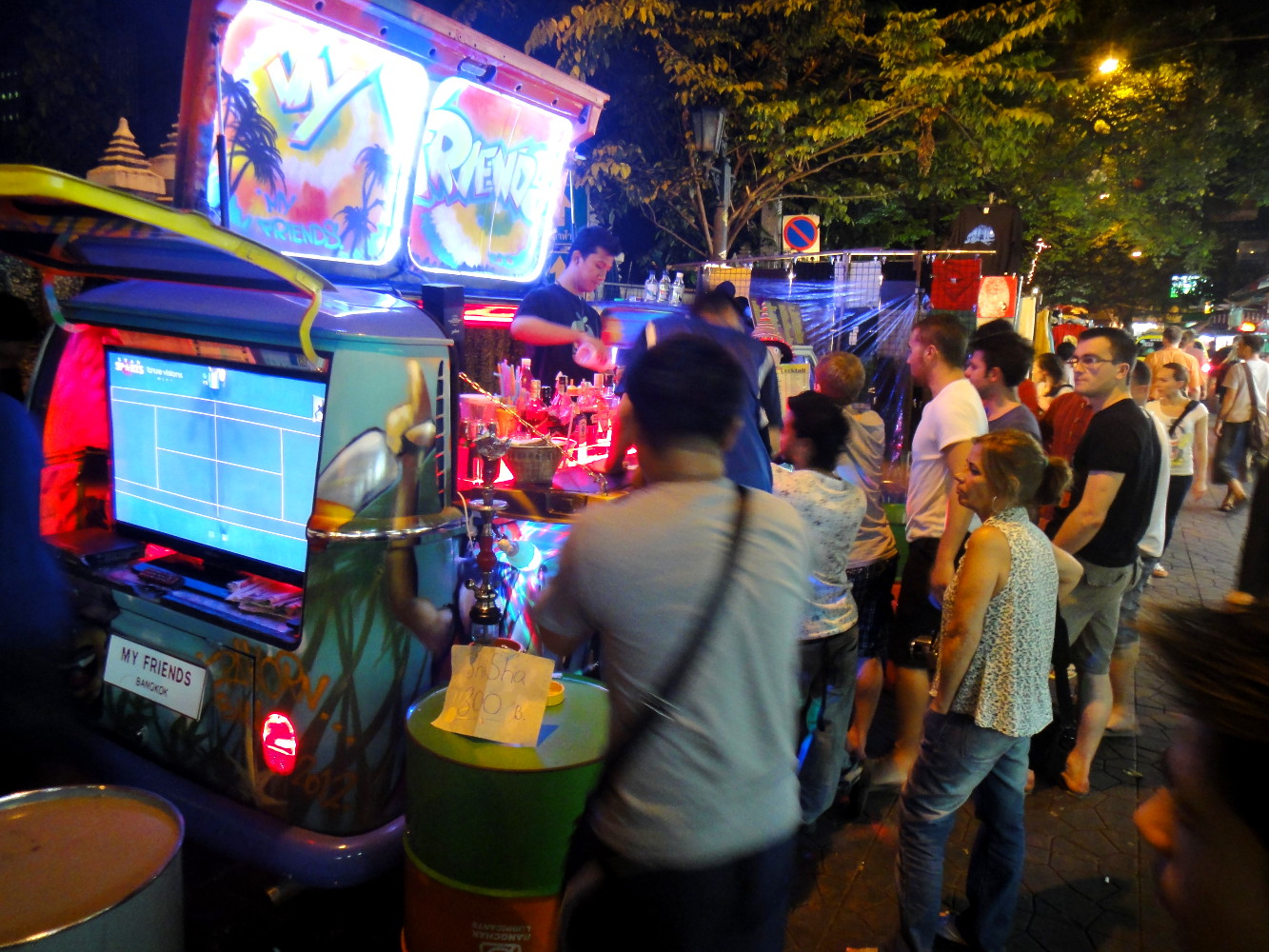
Food truck on Ram Buttri Road in the nighttime

Ram Buttri Road (Thai: ถนนรามบุตรี, RTGS: Thanon Ram Buttri, pronounced [tʰā.nǒn rāːm būt.trīː]), or Soi Ram Buttri (ซอยรามบุตรี, RTGS: Soi Ram Buttri, pronounced [sɔːj rāːm būt.trīː]), also written as Rambuttri, is a short alley-like street in Bangkok, Thailand. It is located near Khaosan Road in the Bang Lamphu neighbourhood. The road mainly consists of two segments. The first connects Sip Sam Hang Road with Chakrabongse Road. The second runs from Chakrabongse Road, next to Wat Chana Songkhram, to Chao Fa Road at the foot of Phra Pinklao Bridge, opposite the National Theatre.

The name "Ram Buttri" means "daughter of Rama". It refers to Princess Pao Suriyakul, daughter of Prince Rama Isares. She donated funds to build a bridge in honour of her father, which spanned Khlong Bang Lamphu, also known as Khlong Ban Khaek. The bridge was named "Saphan Ram Buttri", and the canal became known as Khlong Ram Buttri. The official opening ceremony took place on 13 August 1910 and was presided over by King Chulalongkorn (Rama V). Later, the canal was filled in and turned into a street, and the bridge was demolished, although the name remained.

Today, Ram Buttri Road is lined with hostels, guesthouses, boutique hotels, bars, Thai massage parlours, 24-hour restaurants, travel agencies, and many street food stalls, which are especially lively at night and are popular among tourists. It is quieter than Khaosan but still lively. The Songkran festival, held every year from 13 to 15 April, makes Khaosan Road one of the busiest areas in Bangkok.

One section of the road that leads to Chao Fa Road is known as "Trok Rong Mai" (ตรอกโรงไหม, RTGS: Trok Rang Mai, pronounced [trɔ̀ːk raŋ máj], lit. 'silk factory lane'). During the early Rattanakosin period, there were two royal silk-weaving factories. One was near Saphan Chang Rong Si (in the present-day area of the Ministry of Interior and Ministry of Defence), and the other near the Front Palace. The factory near Saphan Chang Rong Si was closed during the reign of King Nangklao (Rama III), leaving only the other one in operation. This factory produced silk for the monarch, royal family members, and senior civil servants. It remained active until the reign of King Chulalongkorn, when it was shut down due to increasing imports of fabric from abroad. The canal that once ran through this area was also called Khlong Rong Mai. (Note: Northern end of the old city moat, Khlong Khu Mueang Doem. The canal was filled in 1971 along with the demolition of the Chaloem Sawan 58 Bridge to make way for the construction of the Pra Pin-Klao Bridge.) As with Saphan Ram Buttri and Khlong Ram Buttri, even though the canal and factory no longer exist, the name "Trok Rong Mai" is still used today. The lane is now home to several guesthouses catering to tourists, much like the nearby Ram Buttri Road.
