= Khaosan Road =

Street in Bangkok, Thailand

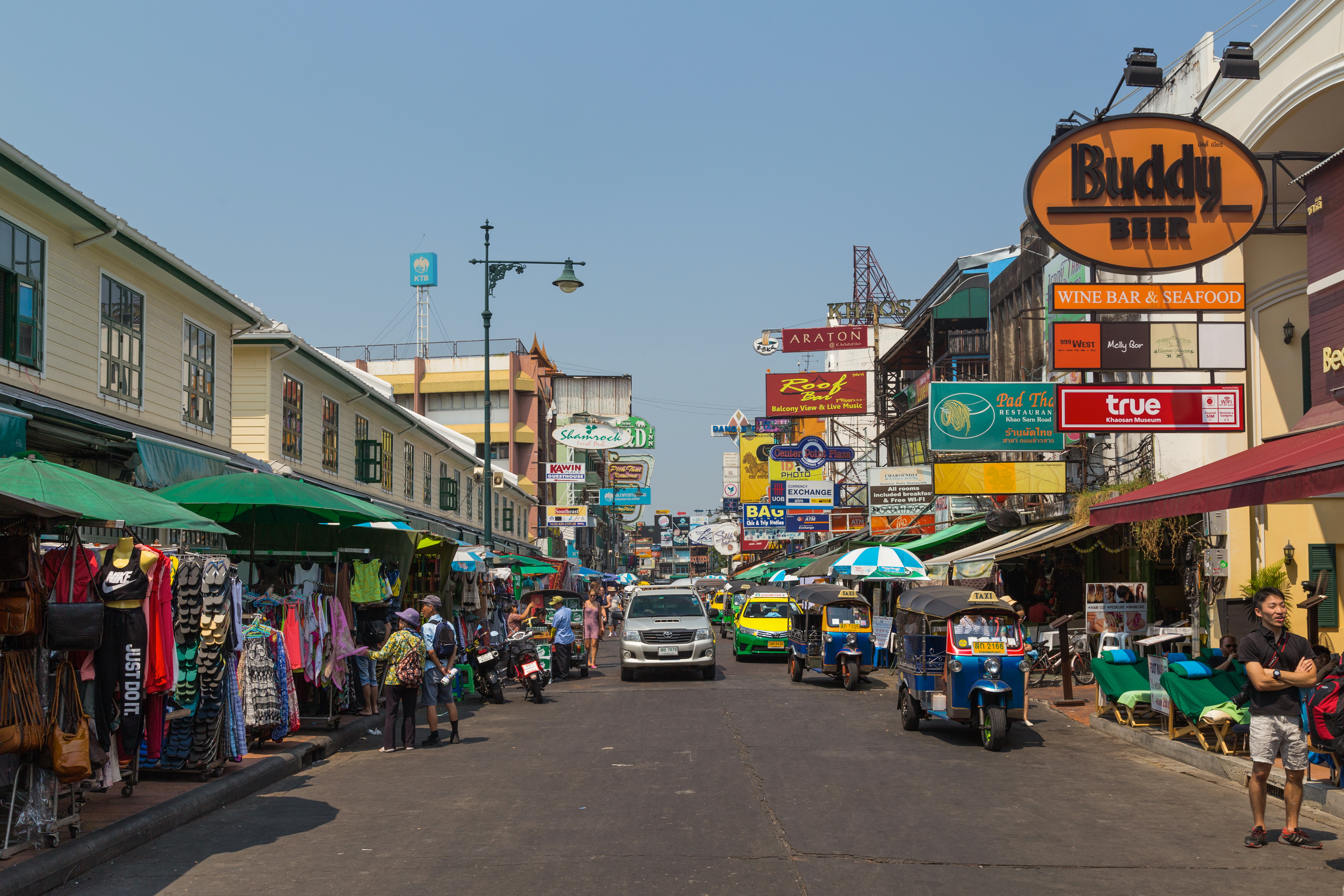
- Khaosan Road in 2016
- Interactive map of Khaosan Road
- Native name: ถนนข้าวสาร (Thai)
- Location: Khwaeng Talat Yot, Khet Phra Nakhon, Bangkok, Thailand
- Coordinates: 13°45′32″N 100°29′50″E

Khaosan Road or Khao San Road (Thai: ถนนข้าวสาร, RTGS: Thanon Khao San, pronounced [tʰā.nǒn kʰâ(ː)w sǎːn]) is a 410 m (1,350 ft)-long street in central Bangkok, Thailand, constructed in 1892 during the reign of Rama V. It is in the Bang Lamphu area of Phra Nakhon District about 1 km (0.62 mi) north of the Grand Palace and Wat Phra Kaew.

== History ==
The name Khaosan (literally: milled rice) indicates that it was once a major rice market. However, historical records from when the road was first completed during the reign of Rama V indicate that none of the local residents were involved in the rice trade at that time. This suggests that rice trading in the area probably began earlier, in the early Rattanakosin period during the reigns of Rama I to Rama III.

According to those who had lived in Bang Lamphu for many years, the first guesthouse on Khaosan Road opened around 1982 in a narrow soi (alley) connecting to Ratchadamnoen Avenue. At that time, Khaosan Road was very quiet. There were small shophouses on both sides of the street, including beef noodle shops, grocery stores, Thai fabric stores, and 3–4 illegal snooker clubs frequented mostly by teenagers. There were also a few old houses belonging to the local gentry.

A Buddhist temple under royal patronage, the centuries-old Wat Chana Songkram, is directly opposite Khaosan Road to the west, while the area to the northwest contains an Islamic community and several small mosques.

=== Improvements 2019–2020 ===
Before redevelopment in 2018

In 2019, the BMA announced that it would commit 48.8 million baht to transform Khaosan Road into an “international walking street". The works were completed in 2020, accelerated in-part thanks to a sharp decline in tourism during the COVID-19 pandemic. Gutters connected to the main drainage system were installed on both sides of the road, and a designated space for emergency vehicles to park was constructed. A space management plan was put in place, with hundreds of vendors allocated designated stalls and scheduled shifts. The road reopened on the same year.

== Retail ==
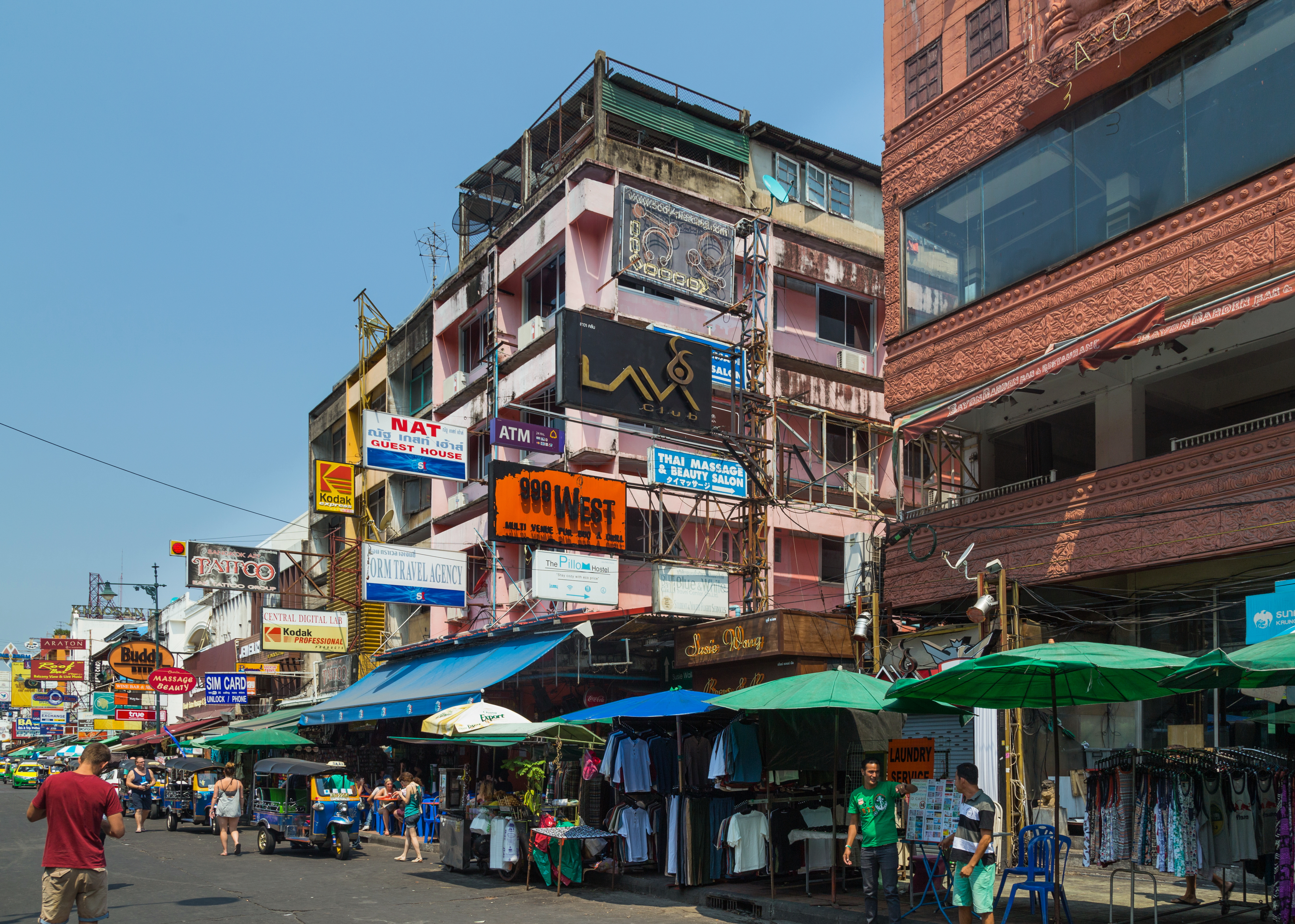
Khaosan Road during the daytime (2016)

Khaosan shops sell handicrafts, paintings, clothes, local fruits, unlicensed CDs, DVDs, a wide range of fake IDs, used books, and other items useful for backpackers. After dark, bars open, music is played, food hawkers sell barbecued insects and other exotic snacks for tourists, and touts promote ping pong shows. There are also cannabis shops.

It is also a base for travel: coaches leave daily for all major tourist destinations in Thailand, from Chiang Mai in the north to Ko Pha-ngan in the south. There are many relatively inexpensive travel agents who can arrange visas and transportation to the neighbouring countries of Cambodia, Laos, Malaysia, and Vietnam.

In July 2018, the Bangkok Metropolitan Administration (BMA), in an attempt to clean up Khaosan Road, announced that street vendors would be removed from the thoroughfare from 1 August 2018. The BMA intended to move them to a nearby area and restrict their trading hours to 18:00 to midnight. The Khaosan Street Vendors Association, representing some 300 vendors, rejected the move, citing financial ruin for vendors. Last-minute negotiations between the BMA and vendors proved fruitless as neither side was willing to compromise. Khaosan vendors announced that, in defiance of BMA order, they would be open as usual on 1 August. On the first day of the ban on stalls, roughly 70 percent of the vendors opened as usual in defiance of the police.

== Tourism ==
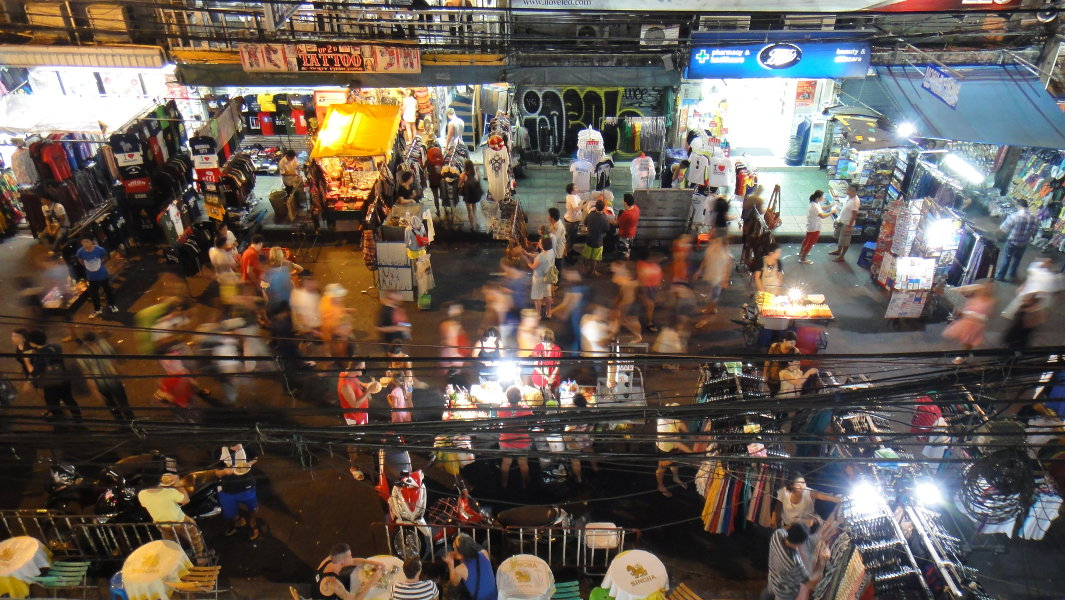

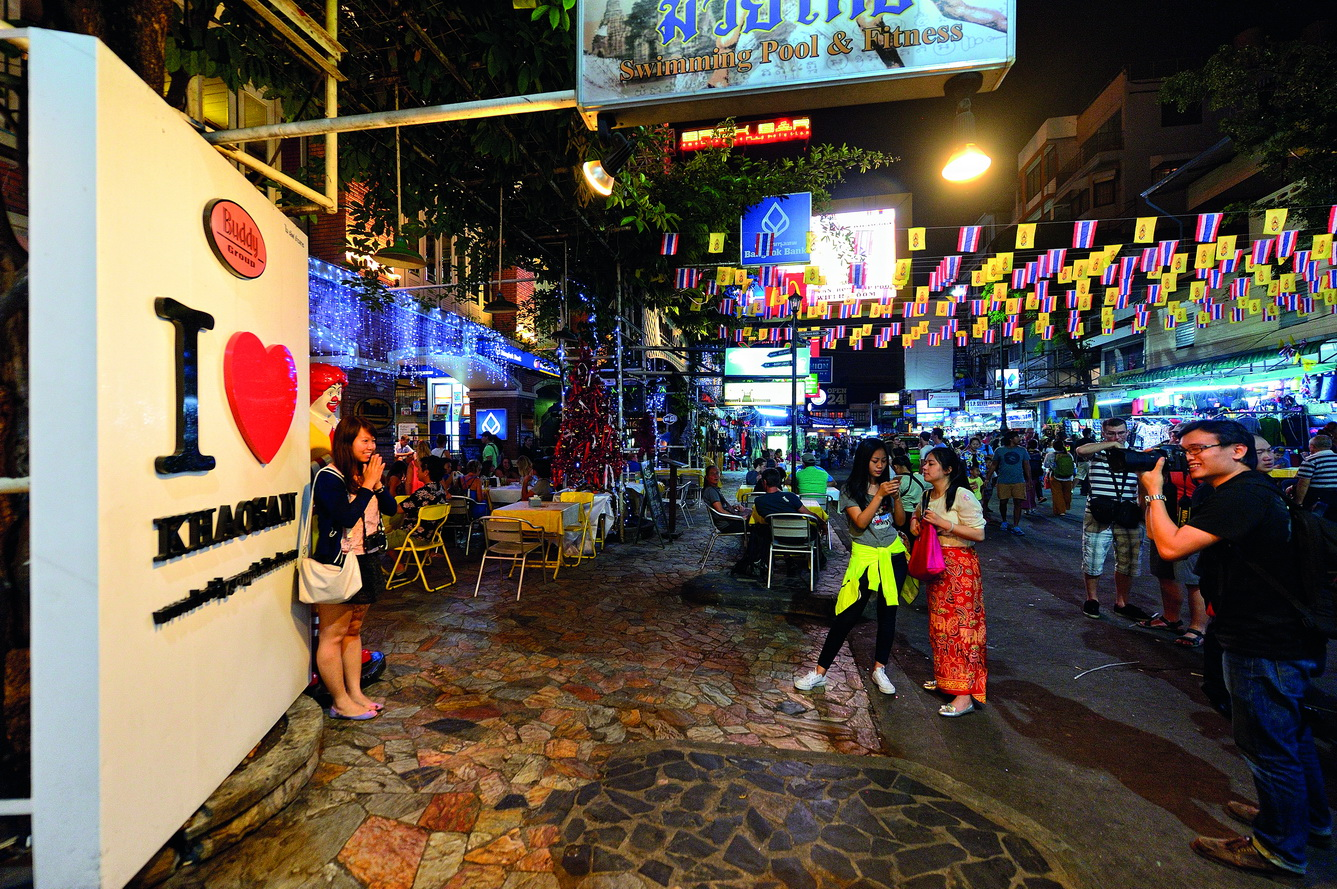
Khaosan Road at night

In the last 40 years, Khaosan Road has developed into a world-famous "backpacker ghetto". It offers cheap accommodation, ranging from "mattress in a box"-style hotels to reasonably priced three-star hotels. In an essay on the backpacker culture of Khaosan Road, Susan Orlean called it "the place to disappear". According to the Khao San Business Association, the road has 40,000–50,000 tourists per day in the high season, and 20,000 per day in the low season.

Visitors to Khao San Road are diverse:

In this small area one can observe the interactions and groupings of disparate characters such as un-educated young Westerners on extended leave from affluent society, high school graduates on gap year travels, Israelis fresh out of military service, university students on holiday or sabbatical leave, young Japanese in rite-of-passage attire, ordinary holidaymakers, (ex-) volunteers from various organizations, and the like.

— Anders Sørensen, Annals of Tourism Research

The area is known internationally as a center of dancing, partying, and just prior to the traditional Thai New Year (Songkran festival) of 13–15 April, water splashing that usually turns into a huge water fight. One Thai writer has described Khaosan as "...a short road that has the longest dream in the world". Khaosan Road has become a model for other modern Songkran celebration venues. As a result, many roads in provincial areas across Thailand have been named with the prefix "Khao" such as Khaolam Road ("sticky rice in bamboo road") in Chonburi, Khaosuk Road ("cooked rice road") in Ang Thong, and Khaopun Road ("khanom chin road") in Nakhon Phanom. Nationwide, there are more than 50 such roads.

== See also ==
- Banana Pancake Trail
