= Banana Pancake Trail =

Backpacking areas in Southeast Asia

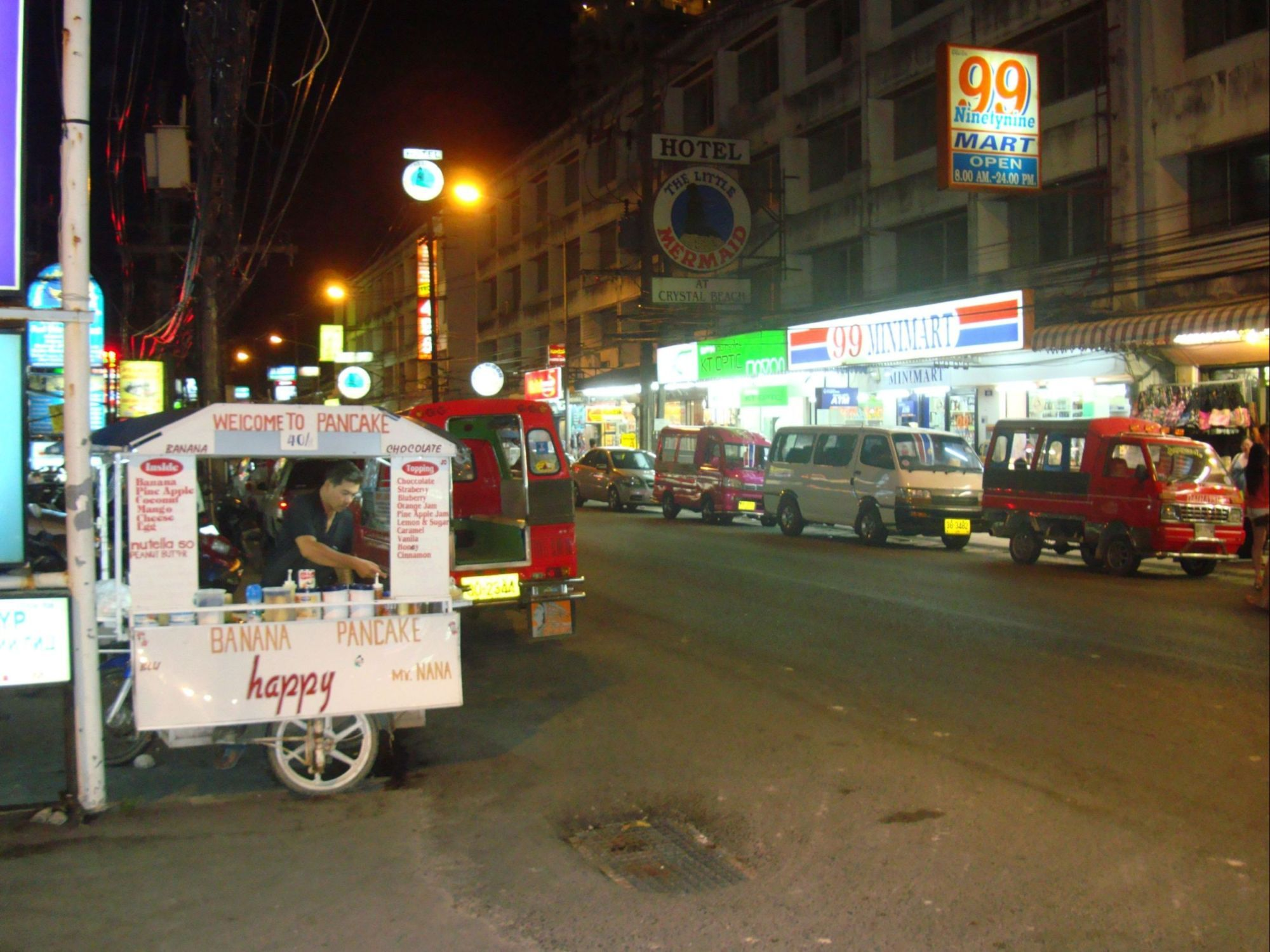
Street stall selling banana pancakes in Phuket City, Thailand

"Banana Pancake Trail" or "Banana Pancake Circuit" is the name given to growing routes around Southeast Asia, and to some extent South Asia, travelled by backpackers and other tourists. The trail has no clear geographical definition, but is used as a metaphor for places that are popular among Western tourists.

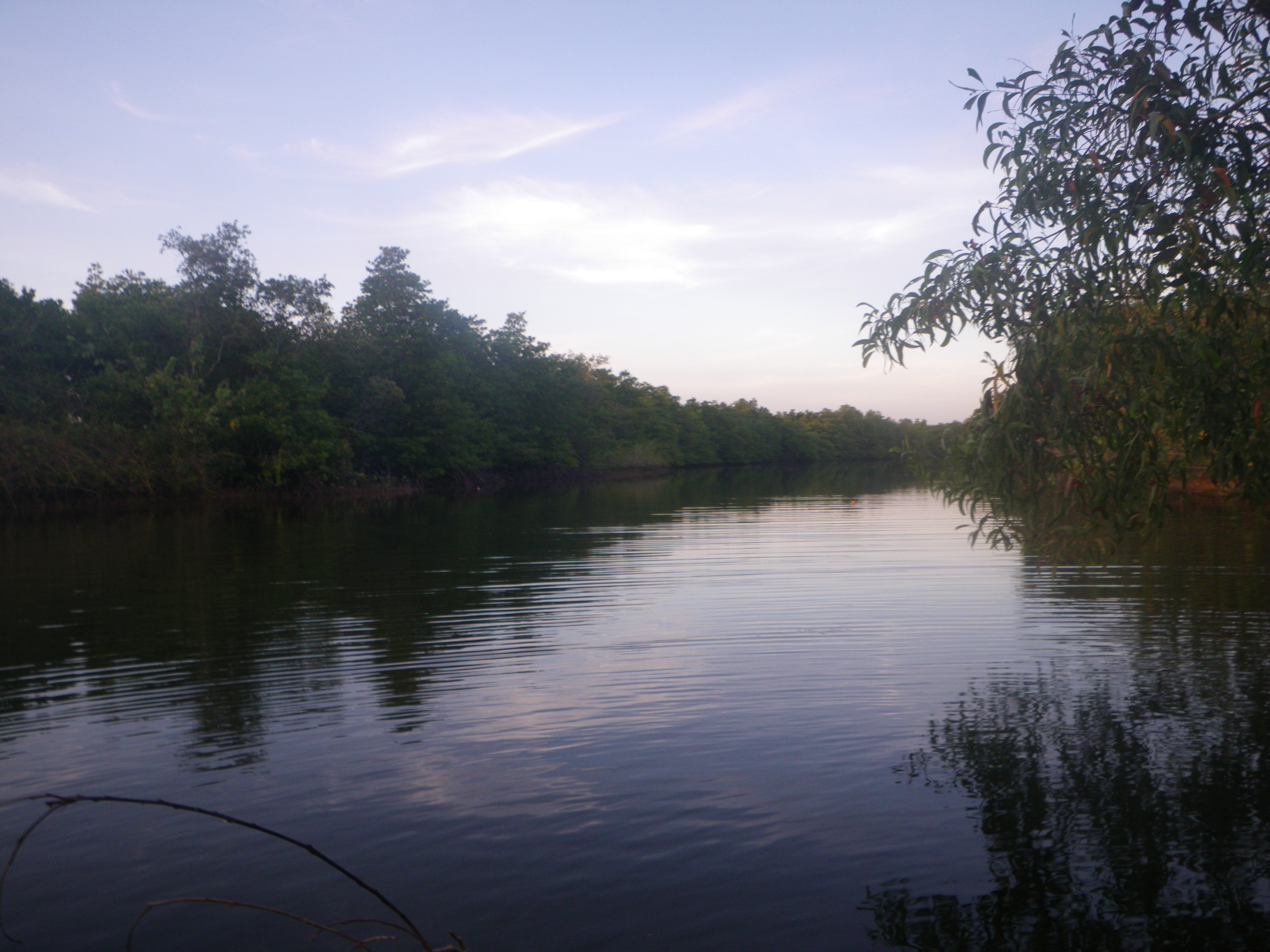
Sihanoukville section of the Banana Pancake Trail

== Etymology ==
A banana pancake in Hoi An, Vietnam. The trail is named after this food.

The Banana Pancake Trail is sometimes associated with backpackers who use Lonely Planet travel guides. Banana Pancake trails materialise when an influx of Western backpackers to an area leads to a rise in the number of restaurants serving comfort food adapted to Western desires.

== Popularity ==
The Banana Pancake Trail is one of the most popular backpacking routes across the world, served by Asia's many hostels.

== Geographical reach ==
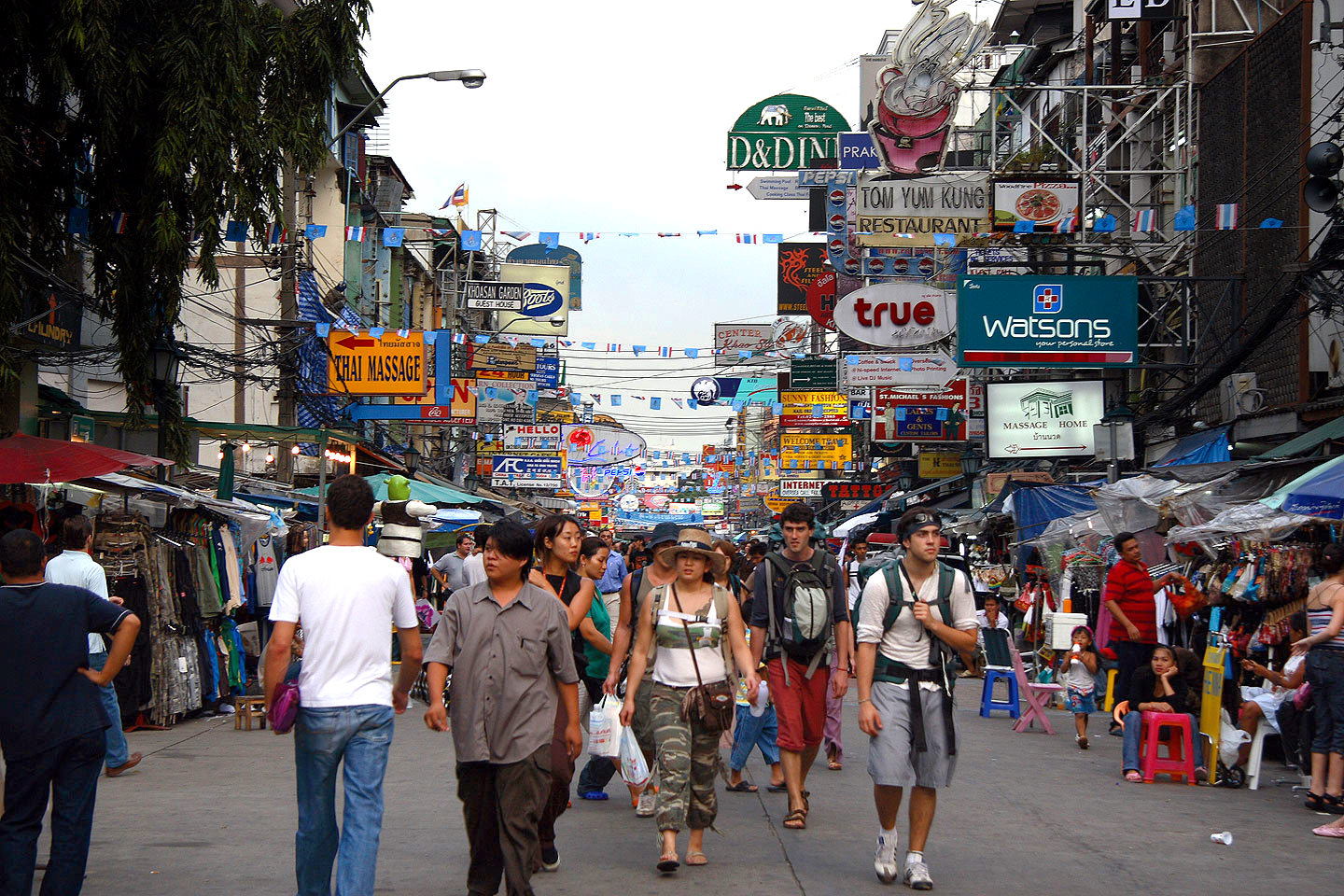
Khao San Road in Bangkok, Thailand, a notable stop on the Banana Pancake Trail

There is no firm geographical definition of the Banana Pancake Trail, as it is a metaphor to describe the ever-developing travellers' trails in South Asia and Southeast Asia, rather than an actual route or road (much like the Silk Road is not a single road).
