= Wat Mangkon Kamalawat =

Chinese Buddhist temple in Bangkok, Thailand

- วัดมังกรกมลาวาส 龍蓮寺
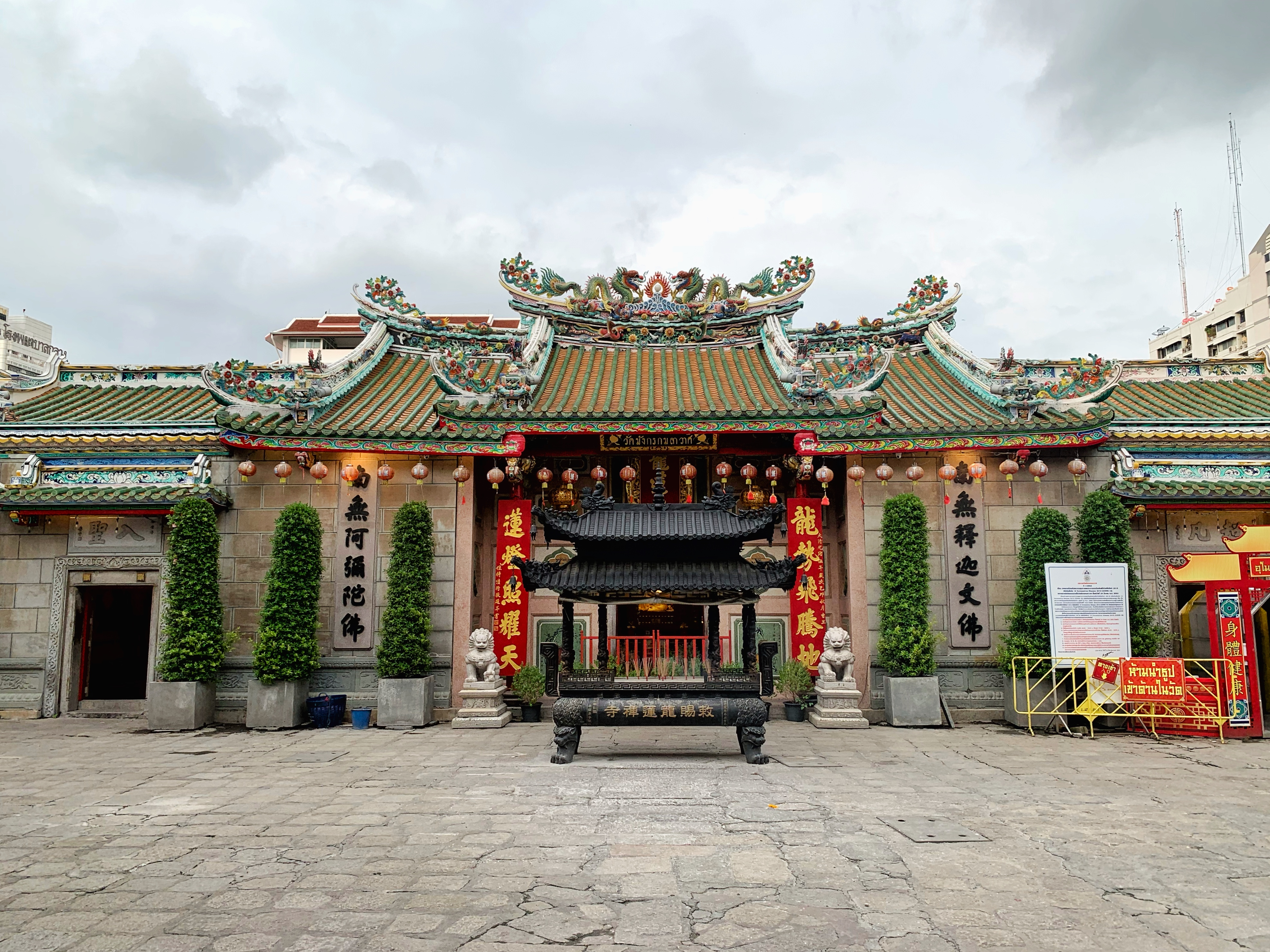
- Wat Mangkon Kamalawat in 2020 during the COVID-19 pandemic

- Location within Bangkok

Religion
- Affiliation: Mahayana Buddhism, Chinese Folk Religion
- Deity: Bhotisttawa Phra Mae Kuanim (Guanyin)

Location
- Country: Thailand
- Coordinates: 13.743828°N 100.509552°E

Architecture
- Type: Chinese Architecture
- Founder: King Nangklao (Rama III)
- Completed: 1846

Wat Mangkon Kamalawat (Thai: วัดมังกรกมลาวาส, pronounced [wát māŋ.kɔ̄ːn kā(m).mā.lāː.wâːt]), also known by its former name as Wat Leng Noei Yi (Thai: วัดเล่งเน่ยยี่, pronounced [wát lêŋ nɤ̂j jîː]; simplified Chinese: 龙莲寺; traditional Chinese: 龍蓮寺; pinyin: Lónglián Sì), is the largest and most important Chinese Buddhist temple in Bangkok, Thailand. It hosts celebrations of a number of year-round events, including Chinese New Year, and the annual Chinese vegetarian festival.

It is located in the district of Pom Prap Sattru Phai in the city's Chinatown, in an area between soi Charoen Krung 19 and soi Charoen Krung 21. The temple is the provenance of Wat Mangkon MRT station on the MRT Blue Line. The station has been serving the temple and nearby Chinatown since 2019.

== History ==
Wat Mangkon Kamalawat was founded as a Mahayana Buddhist temple in 1871 or 1872 (sources differ), by Phra Archan Chin Wang Samathiwat (also known as Sok Heng), initially with the name Wat Leng Noei Yi. It was later given its current name, Wat Mangkon Kamalawat, meaning "Dragon Lotus Temple", by King Chulalongkorn (Rama V).

== Style and Layout ==
The temple is built in a classic Chinese architectural style, with typical sweeping tiled roofs decorated with animal and floral motifs, including the ubiquitous Chinese dragons. The ubosot (ordination hall) houses the temple's main, gold colored, Buddha image in a fusion of Thai and Chinese style, and is fronted by an altar at which religious rites are performed.

The main entrance to the viharn (sermon hall) is flanked by large statues of the four guardians of the world, the Chatulokkaban, clothed in warrior costumes, two on each side. Around the temple there are shrines dedicated to a variety of Buddhist, Taoist and Confucian deities and religious figures, all important in local Chinese beliefs.

At the rear of the temple stand three pavilions, one dedicated to the Chinese goddess (or bodhisattva) of compassion, Guan Yin, one to the temple's founder, Phra Archan Chin Wang Samathiwat, and one to the saint Lak Chao. Near the rear is also to be found a gallery containing cases of gilded Buddha images in the double Abhaya Mudra position.

The courtyard in front of the main temple buildings is home to several other shrines, including a furnace for the ritual burning of paper money and other offerings to the devotees' ancestors.

== Timings ==
The temple is open from 8 am to 4 pm. Admission to this temple is free.

== See also ==
- List of Buddhist temples in Thailand
- Wat Bamphen Chin Phrot
- Wat Dibayavari Vihara
- Thian Fah Foundation
