= Wat Bamphen Chin Phrot =

Buddhist temple in Thailand

Coordinates: 13°44′31.9″N 100°30′27.8″E

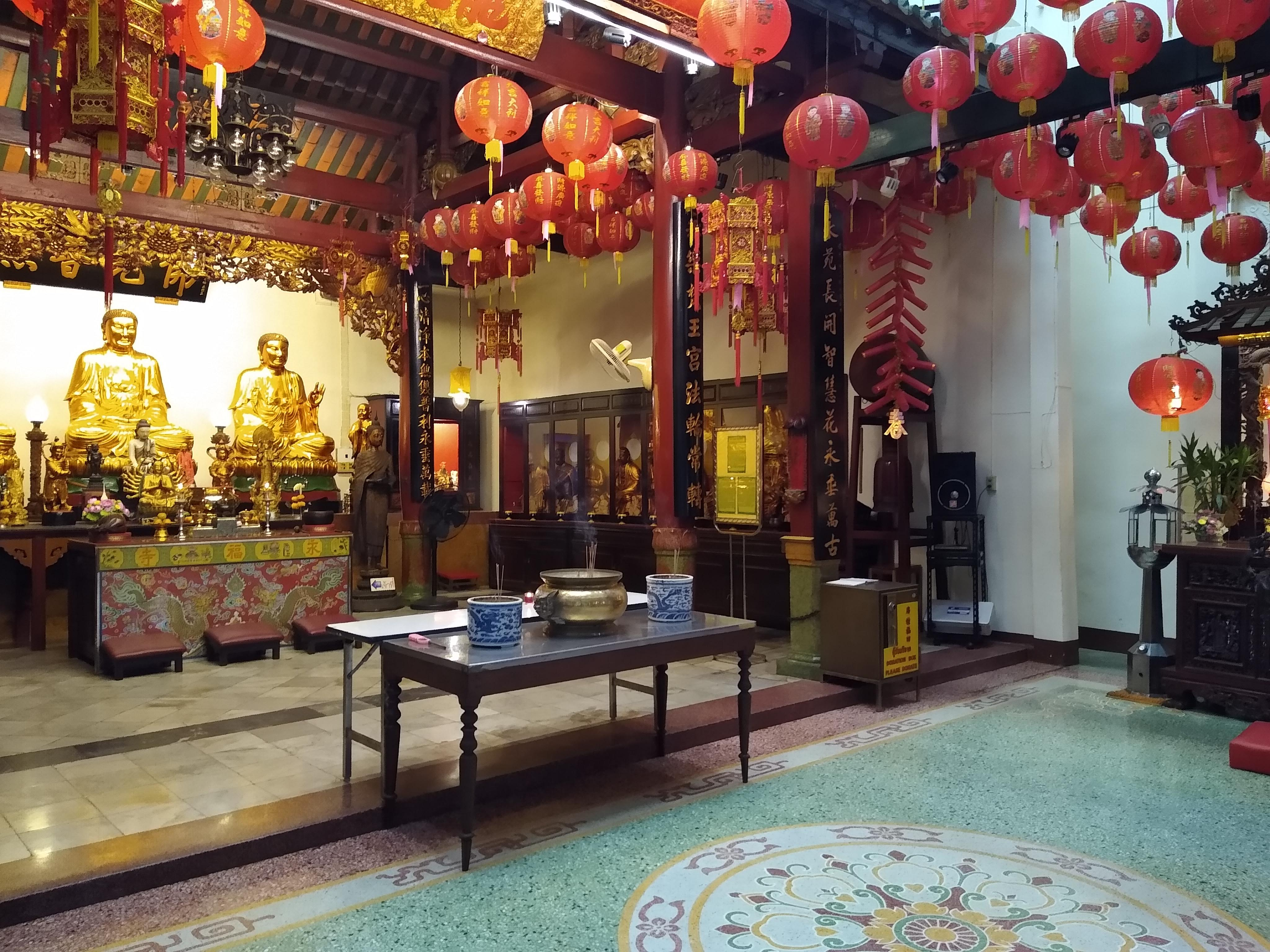

Wat Bamphen Chin Phrot (Thai: วัดบำเพ็ญจีนพรต; Chinese: 永福寺; pinyin: Yǒngfú Sì) or familiarly known in Teochew Yong Hok Yi (ย่งฮกยี่) is a Chinese temple of the Mahāyāna sect in Thailand, located on Soi Yaowarat 8 (Trok Tao), Samphanthawong Subdistrict, Samphanthawong District, Bangkok. This temple has many interesting features, because it is one of the oldest Chinese temples in Thailand (old than nearby Wat Mangkon Kamalawat), including the only temple located on Yaowarat Road and can be considered as the smallest temple in the country, because it is only five storey shophouse.

The temple was originally Avalokiteśvara's place of worship founded by overseas Chinese who live in Siam (Thailand at that time) since 1795 (corresponding to the reign of Qianlong Emperor). Later abandoned, Chinese monk named Sok Heng was renovated in 1867 and received a Thai name from King Chulalongkorn (Rama V) that "Wat Bamphen Chin Phrot" (literally: Practice Chinese Buddhist Teaching Temple) until now. At present the temple name plaque, which was given by the king still hanging over the entrance of the main hall.

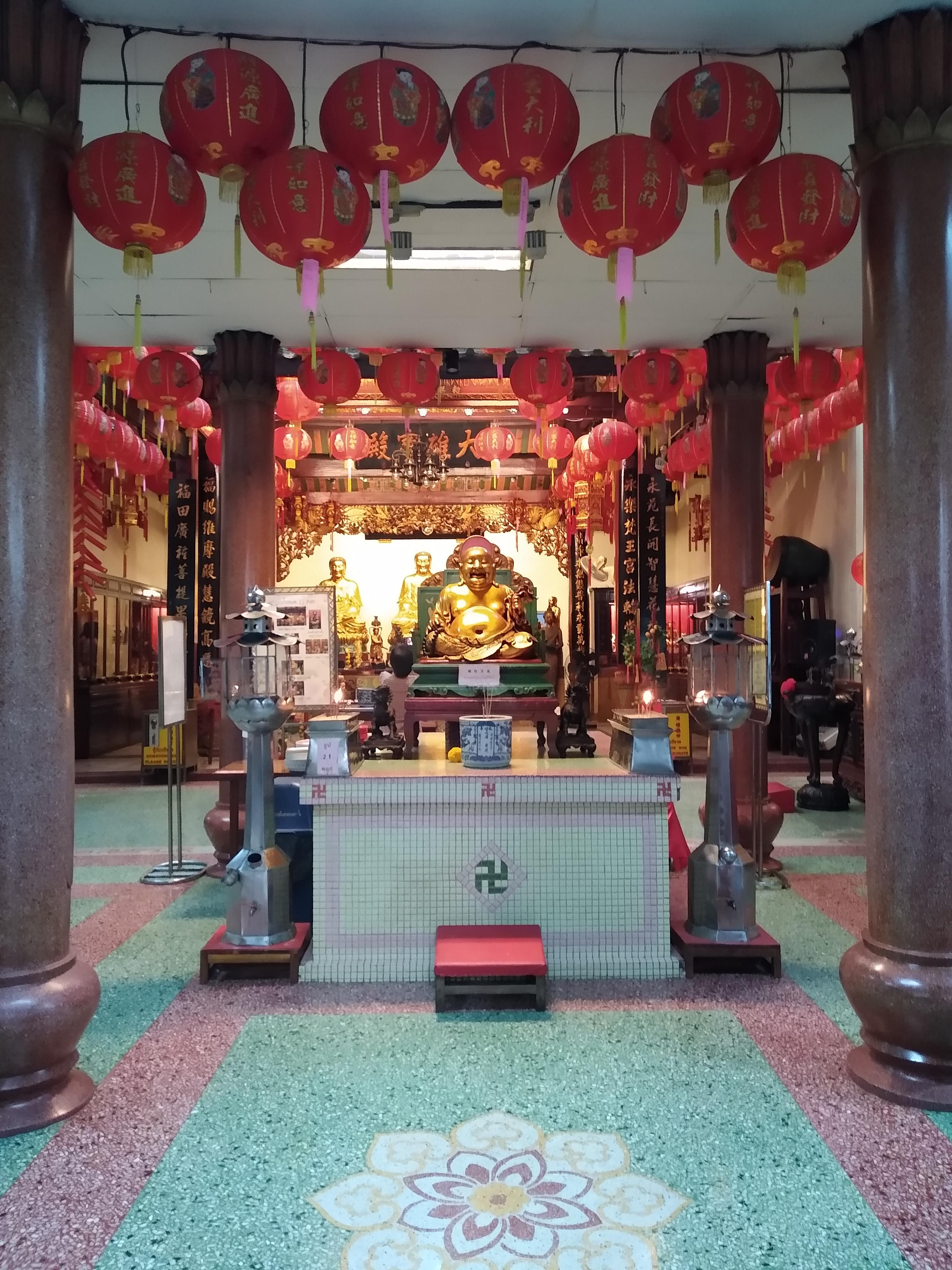

The interesting thing of Wat Bamphen Chin Phrot, besides the main hall, is only a small room built with a width of 7.80 m and 10.20 m long with Teochew architectural style. The principle Buddha images are Trikāya and Eighteen Arhats that enshrined on the side all made from papier-mâché. Including idols of other Chinese gods to worship such as Guan Yu, Xuanwu, Caishen, Tai Sui, Kātyāyana etc.
