= Wat Rakhangkhositaram =

Buddhist temple in Bangkok, Thailand

- วัดระฆังโฆสิตาราม
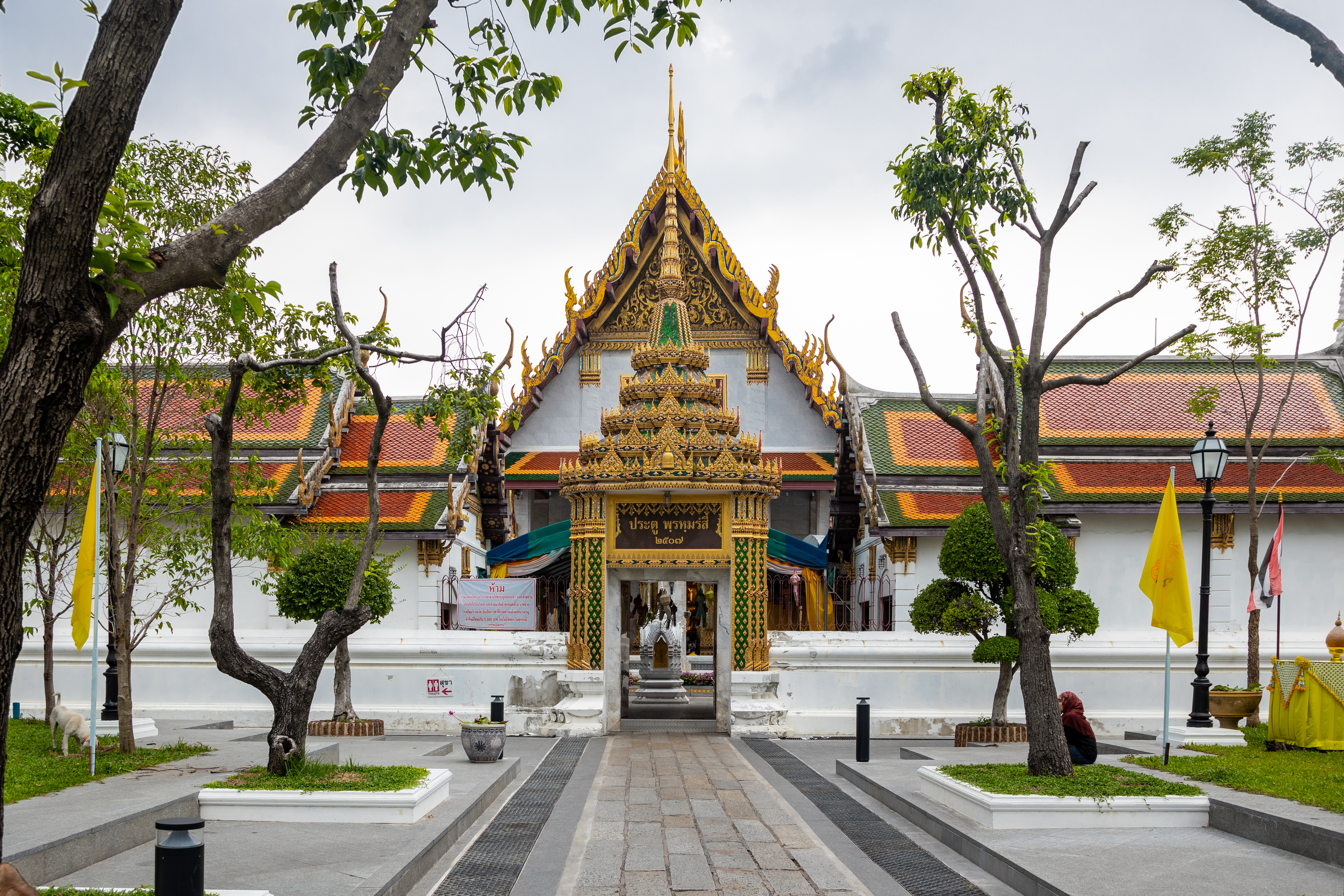
- The entrance of Wat Rakhang Khositaram in 2019, following recent renovations of the gardens

- Location within Bangkok

Religion
- Affiliation: Buddhism

Location
- Location: 250/1 Arun Amarin Road, Siri Rat Subdistrict, Bangkok Noi District, Thonburi
- Country: Thailand
- Coordinates: 13°45′09.72″N 100°29′07.44″E

Wat Rakhangkhositaram (Thai: วัดระฆังโฆสิตาราม วรมหาวิหาร) is a second-class royal monastery in Bangkok, Thailand. It's located at 250/1 Arun Amarin Road, Siri Rat subdistrict, Bangkok Noi district, Thonburi side on the west bank of Chao Phraya River near Siriraj Hospital, Wang Lang Market and Ban Khamin Junction.

The temple, formerly named "Wat Bangwayai" (วัดบางหว้าใหญ่; lit: big black plum temple), was built in the Ayutthaya period. It was restored and appointed a royal temple by King Taksin of the Thonburi Kingdom, who sponsored the revision of the tripitaka scriptures at the temple. During the reign of King Rama I, a melodious rakhang or bell was found in the temple compound. The King order it to be moved to the Temple of the Emerald Buddha (Wat Phra Kaew), and had five new bells sent back in exchange. The king then changed the temple's name to Wat Rakhangkositaram. In the reign of King Mongkut (Rama IV) the name was to be changed again to "Wat Rajkanthiyaram" (วัดราชคัณฑิยาราม; "kanthi" meaning bell). But people don't accept this name, and the temple is still called Wat Rakhang today.

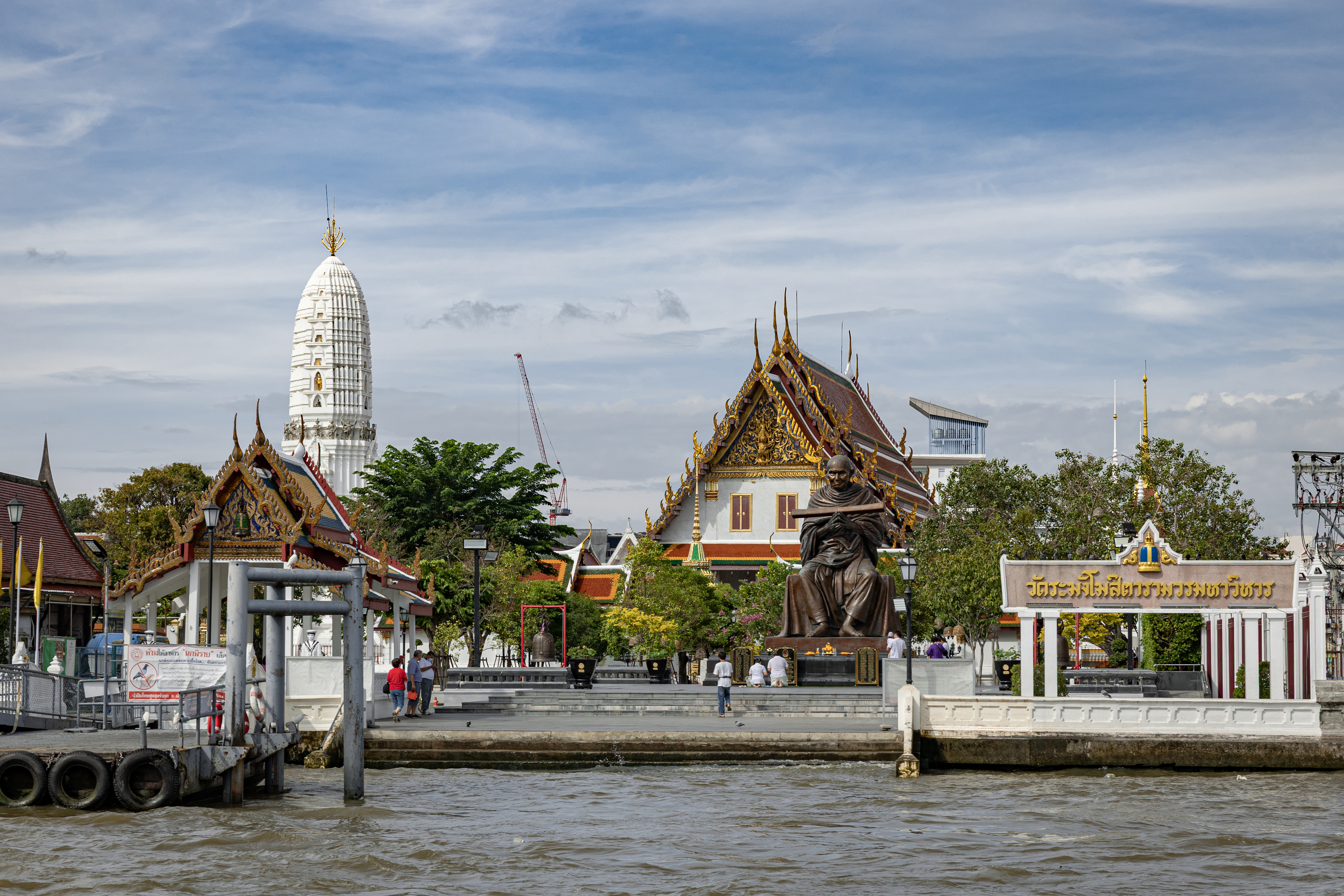
Wat Rakhang as seen from Chao Phraya River

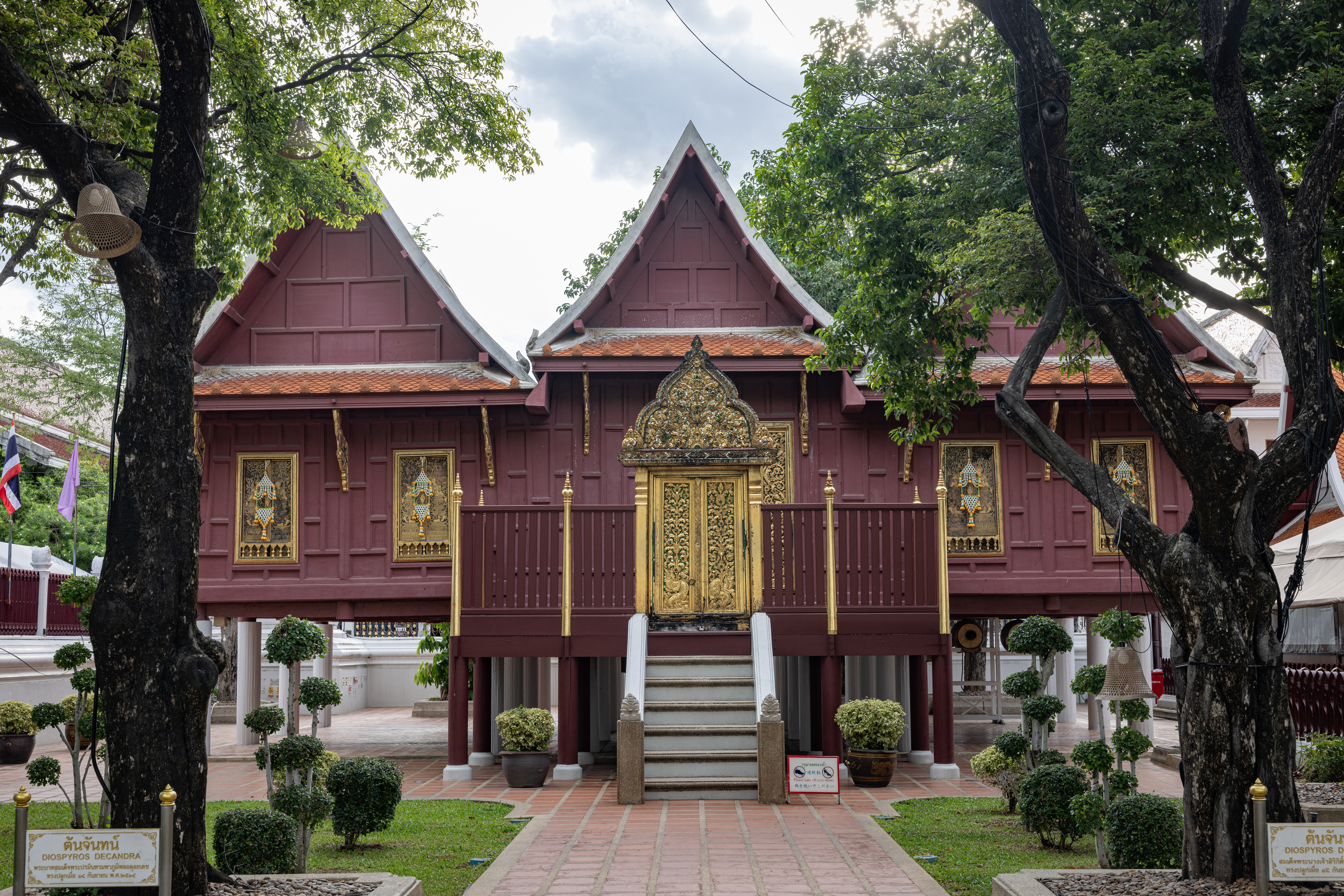
Ho Phra Trai Pidok (หอพระไตรปิฎก; tripitaka hall)

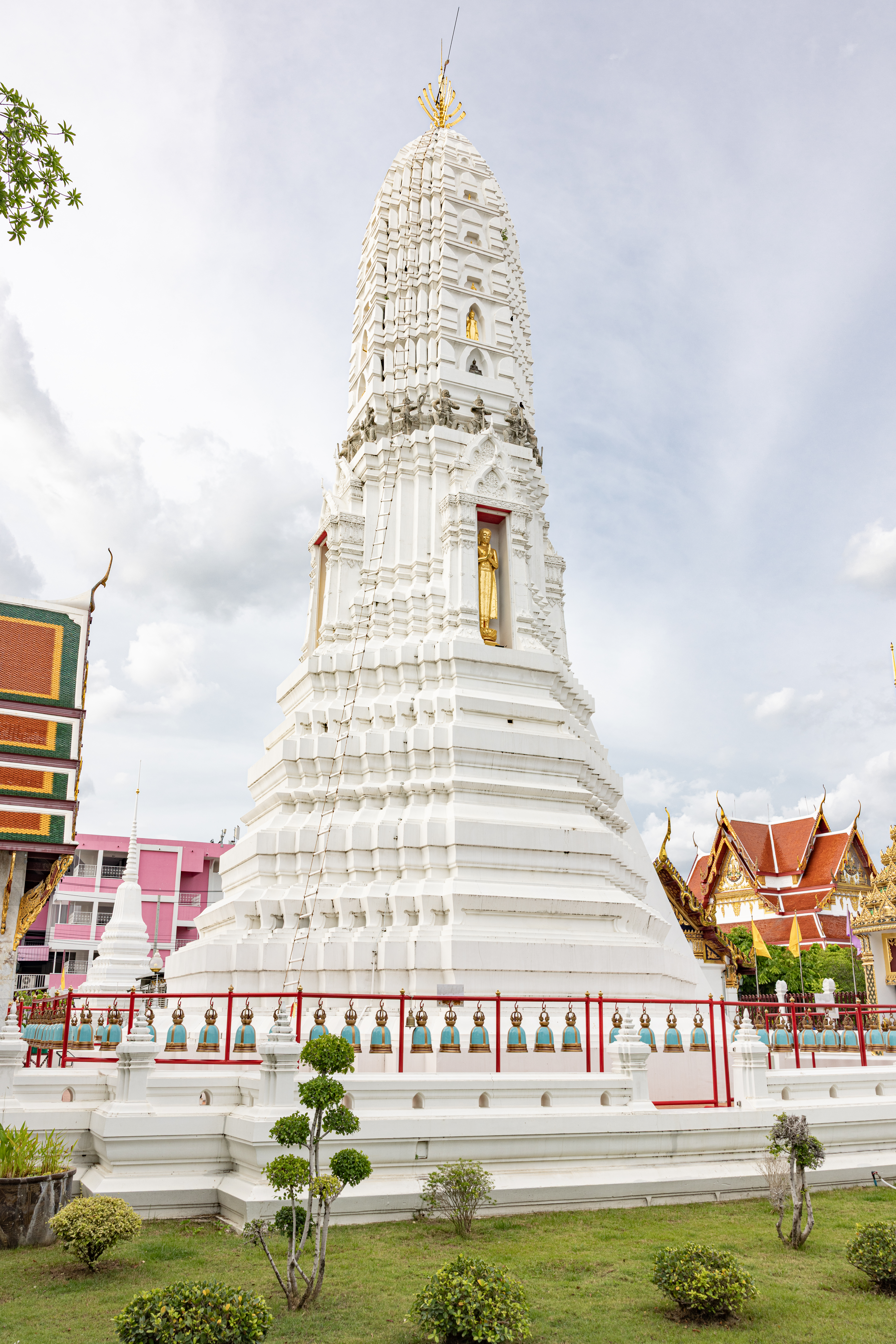
Chedi

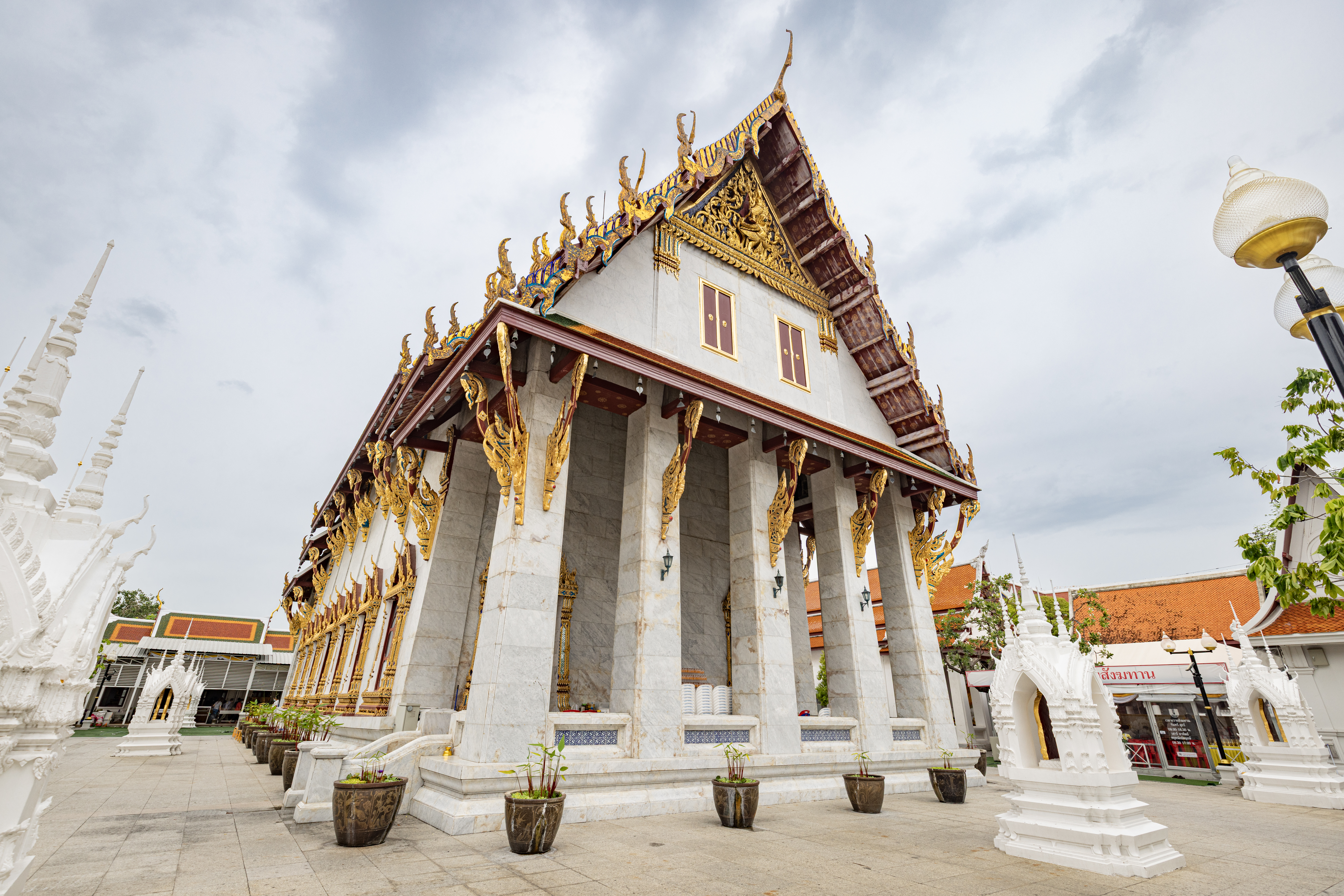
Ubosot

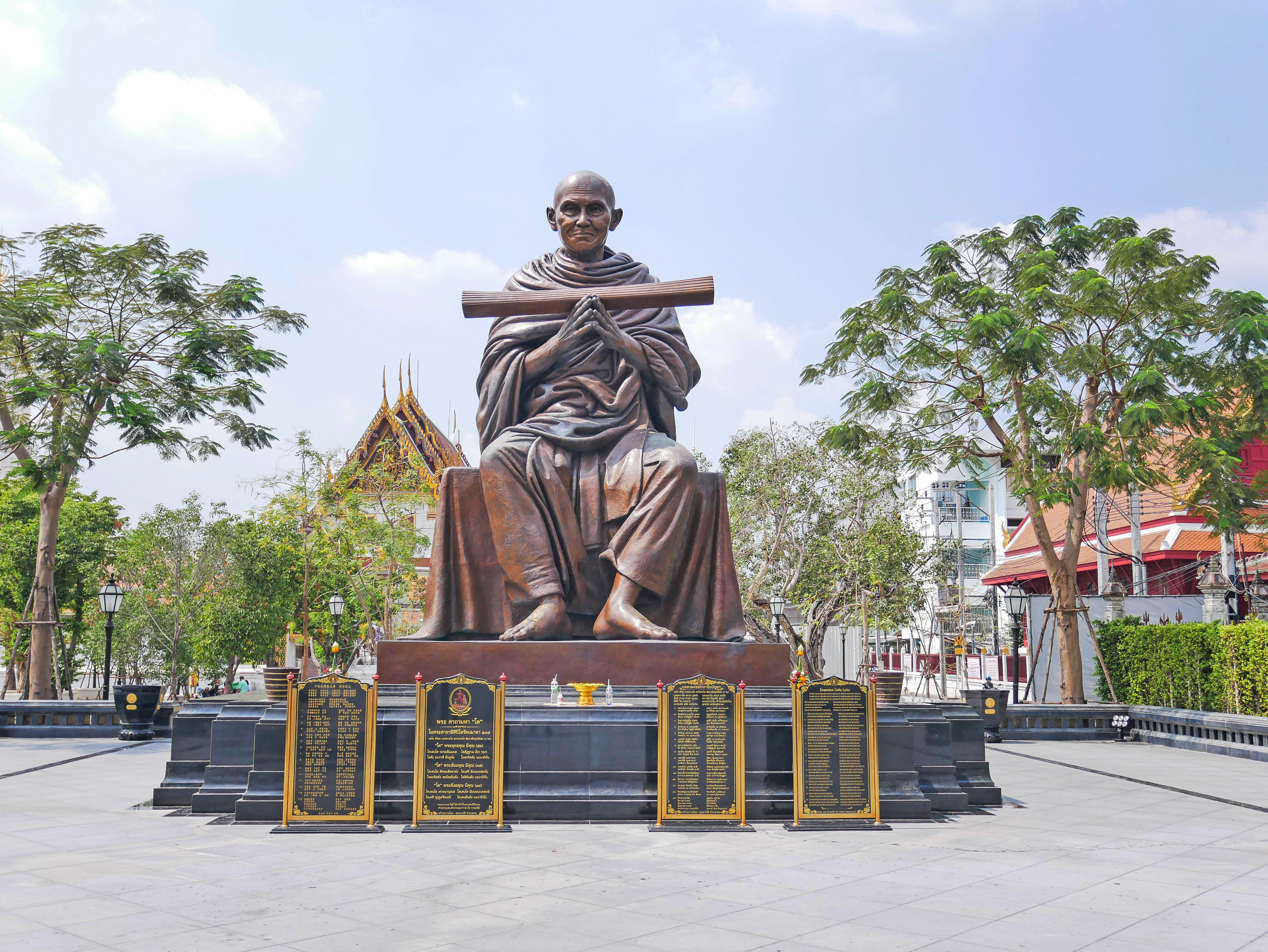
Somdej Toh

Highly venerable monk, Somdej Toh was once the abbot of this temple (1852–72). At present, the temple has an old tripitaka hall, which inside, there're beautiful and precious Thai paintings. Tourism Authority of Thailand (TAT) have encouraged Wat Rakhangkhositaram as one of the nine temple-based campaign "Respect to the Nine Temples" (ไหว้พระ 9 วัด) along with other temples in Bangkok including (Phra Nakhon side): Wat Phra Kaew, Wat Pho, Wat Chana Songkhram, Wat Suthat, City Pillar Shrine, San Chao Pho Suea (Thonburi side): Wat Arun and Wat Kalayanamitr.
