= Thai fabrics =

Thai Fabrics are Thai handicraft products that are indicative of the flourish of the Thai national culture and creativity of the nation in making products and clothes for daily use. Thai Fabric is hand-woven fabric produced in Thailand. It is a cultural heritage and unique culture to the Thai culture and now has been famous throughout the world.

== Background of Thai fabrics ==
Thai people known weaving since prehistoric. Culture and society in the countryside is regarded as weaving is a woman's leisure after her main job, rice planting or farming. This is common to all regions of the country. Product development, design, pattern and color of the fabric inherited a weaver's imagination and the influence of other factors. Thai fabrics is a core material in a cloth and it is indicative of social status including position of the wearer in society. Hence, weaving can classify three main types for people. The first type for public people or citizen. The whole fabric used in daily life and the fabric used on special occasions related to the faith traditions such as fabrics religious ceremony, carnival, festival and important ceremonies. The second type for privileged class, royalty and majesty. This type used a significant fabric such as the ancient embroidered cloth and different extraordinary types of fabric. And the third type for monk and Buddhist Scriptures. Thai fabric has many styles and local identity in each region which has evolved over many generations, such as:

- The 14th – 16th century AD - The Northern Thailand is the location of The Lan Na or Lanna Kingdom. They said that the Lanna people are skilled in weaving, particularly cotton. There is weaving widespread to distribute to the neighboring kingdom. The colorful of cottons in this era are extremely outstanding.
- The Kingdom of Sukhothai - Around 755 years ago, The Sukhothai weaved both cotton and silk fabrics. And especially cotton called "Benjarong Cotton" is a traditional Thai five-colored famous cotton in the Rattanakosin period. The general public is use a common cotton whereas a top grade cotton is used in royal court that has royal tailors and some of fabric order from abroad such as silk, satin from China. Moreover, fabrics are used to decorate houses or made products, for instance mattresses, pillows, curtains, etc.
- Ayutthaya Kingdom - Around 400 years ago, fabrics are important in the trade and economic in the country, it is also used as currency instead money. King used them for reward or maybe the royal salary per year which is embroidered clothes and woven with silk and the center is patterned by fabric. For the general public, men often use loincloth and Commer band (Kamar band in Persian language) and women wear shawl.
- Early Rattanakosin Kingdom - Local weaving in Thailand has spread to almost all regions, but there are specially the Northeast and the North of Thailand. The pattern of the fabric will vary based on ideology, beliefs and traditions of each ethnic group.

== Thai fabrics in regions of Thailand ==
The local Thai fabrics were divided by region.

- Fabrics in the north of Thailand
  Woven fabrics in the north of Thailand or Lanna kingdom, but nowadays they are Chiang Rai, Phayao, Nan, Phrae, Lampang, Chiang Mai and Mae Hong Son and some of the land in Myanmar, China and Laos. Tai Yuan people of Thailand in the past had their own culture, they use of fabric since weaving, creating the pattern and wearing. For example, men would wear such apparel hiked through thigh to show off a tattoo above the knee up to the thigh, and they did not wear shirt or T-shirt but had a fabric across the shoulders, meanwhile elite wear shirt and cummerbund. Women wear Sinhs or Lao skirt fabric striped body. It has a linear pattern and, they wore a fabric chest strap instead shirt. And often have hair bun in the middle of the head, and then pin connector pins or flowers. This dress also appeared on the mural paintings, such as the mural paintings at Wat Phra Sing Waramahavihan in Chiang Mai.
- Fabrics in the northeast of Thailand
  In general, the northeast has a farming social. Most major occupation is farming. It takes about 7 – 9 months from planting until harvest in each year throughout the rainy season and winter. In summer time is about 3 – 5 months, the northeast will spare time to prepare equipment and tools used in everyday life includes the tradition of philanthropy and relaxation. This is the cycle of life in the every year. Local fabrics in the northeast are well known since ancient times. There are two types of woven fabrics from cotton and silk. Nevertheless, they bring polyester mixed such as thread and Toray silk. This is characterized by native weaving same people are doing every step. Since cotton planting and mulberry planting (Mulberry in Thailand) to feed silkworms. Remove the cocoons to the line until they purify and dyed cotton.
- Fabrics in the central of Thailand
  Immigration Tai - Laos to settle in various localities in the central region. As a result, they dispersed among various places. Most of these communities are still woven fabric for clothing like typical and popular tradition handed down since predecessors. There are important local weaving, for instance the Tai Puan weaving group, in Sukhothai Tai province and the Tai Puan from Laos. In the era of King Rama III, some groups have dispersed settlements in some areas of the province of Suphan Buri, Maha Sarakham and so on. The central region has woven fabrics in many local authorities. But when the industry into the weaving. Many local weaving decays. Although some are still woven together in a way, but the pattern is often changed to meet the needs of consumers. The pattern of fabric in central of Thailand.
- Fabrics in the south of Thailand
  Movement of people from political. Not only Muslims, but Malay moving settlers in the provinces in the South. And the family had to move into Thailand some settlements in a land which originally belonged to Thailand by such communities were evacuated to Thailand in Kelantan and Thairaburi.

This behavior can cause the mixture of races ago. Also caused by a combination of cultural pressure. The weaving of Southern culture. Firstly begins to Nakhon Si Thammarat and then it spread to the other.
