= Wat Dibayavari Vihara =

Buddhist temple in Bangkok

Coordinates: 13°44′45.89″N 100°29′55.45″E

- Kham Low Yi, Temple of Green Dragon
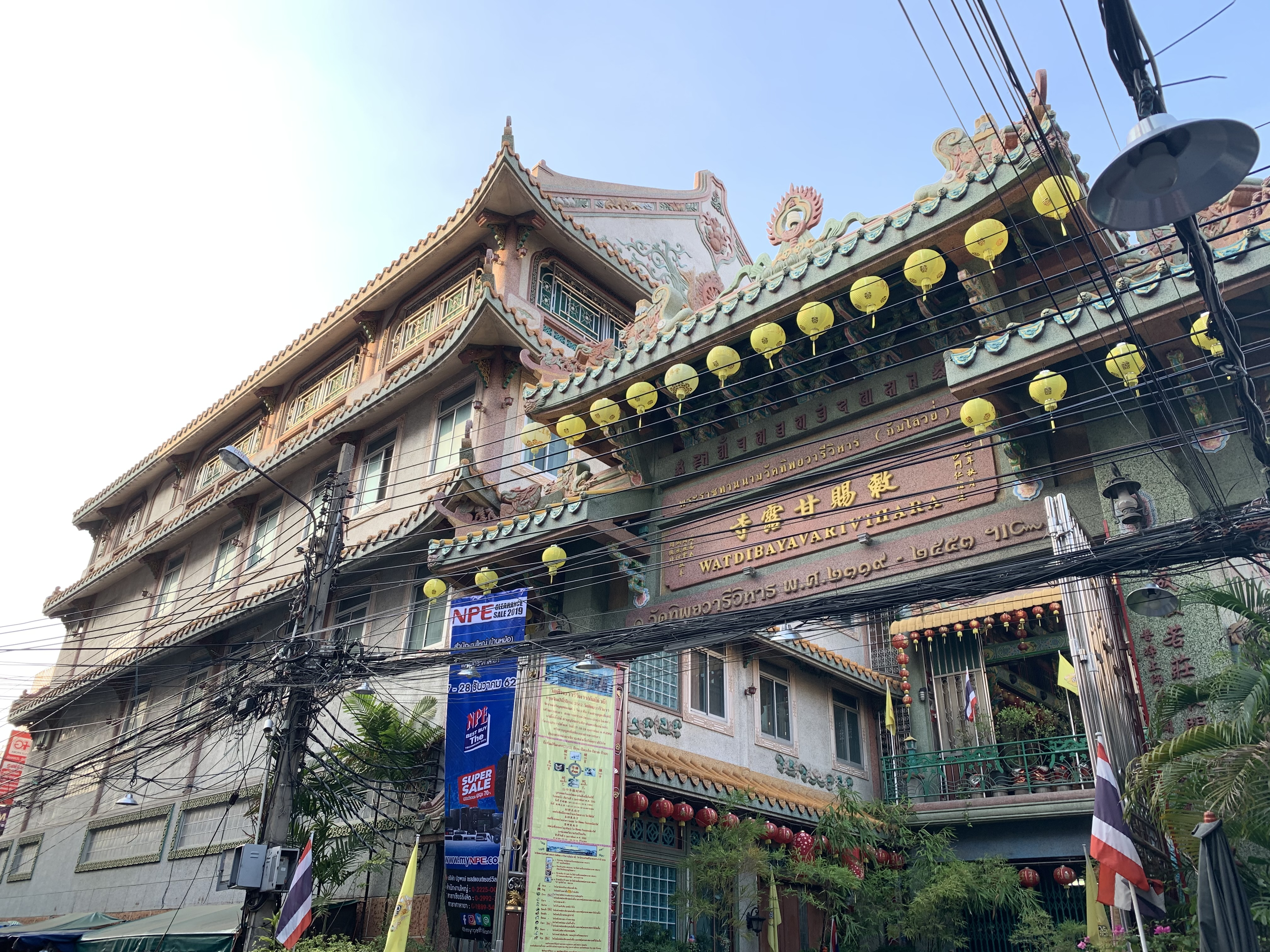
- Temple entrance as seen from Soi Thip Wari

- Location within Thailand

Religion
- Affiliation: Taoist, Buddhist
- Deity: Green Dragon

Location
- Location: 119 Soi Thip Wari, Tri Phet Road, Wang Burapha Phirom Subdistrict, Phra Nakhon District, Bangkok
- Country: Thailand
- Interactive map of Wat Dibayavari Vihara

Architecture
- Founder: Chinese and Vietnamese
- Completed: 1776–77

Wat Dibayavari Vihara (Thai: วัดทิพยวารีวิหาร; RTGS: Wat Thipphaya Wari Wihan; Chinese: 敕賜甘露禪寺; pinyin: Chì cì gānlù chán sì; lit: "Temple of Holy Water"), commonly known as Kham Low Yi (กัมโล่วยี่; 甘露寺; Gānlù sì) is a historic Chinese-Vietnamese temple in Bangkok, located at 119 Soi Thip Wari, Tri Phet Road, Wang Burapha Phirom Subdistrict, Phra Nakhon District, Bangkok in the area of Ban Mo, opposite to The Old Siam Plaza.

This temple was built in the Thonburi period in B.E. 2319 (between April 1776–March 1777) during the reign of King Taksin. He gave the east bank of the Chao Phraya River as a residence for Chinese and Vietnamese. Later on, in the Rattanakosin period. Nguyễn Phúc Ánh, Prince of Huế, who came to rely on the Thai King, smuggled back to his country. Thus making the King's younger brother, Prince Maha Sura Singhanat had doubts about the Vietnamese who living in Siam (Thailand at that time). He ordered the Vietnamese who living there to move out. As a result, this area lonely immediately, and the temple has no monks lived for many years.

Until the B.E. 2439 (1896), one Chinese monk named "Hai Son" (ไห่ซัน) from Hunan came to live here and restored by local Chinese millionaires are sponsors. The result of the restoration makes the temple more beautiful. King Chulalongkorn (Rama V) appointed him as abbot in B.E. 2452 (1909), and gave a Thai official name "Wat Dibayavari Vihara", which meaning "Holy Water Temple". Because of there is a small pond, the water in the pond is believed to be holy water. This pond is believed to have Green Dragon (one of Four Symbols according to the ancient Chinese beliefs) as patron. This makes the temple is well known as "Temple of Green Dragon". Inside were enshrined many idols such as Hua Tuo, Green Dragon, Yue Lao, Erlang Shen, Trikāya, Avalokiteśvara etc.

At present, it is popular among Chinese, including Thais for ward off bad luck according to Chinese astrology especially in New Year or Chinese New Year and Chinese vegetarian festival.
