= Wat Kanlayanamit =

Buddhist temple in Bangkok, Thailand

Wat Kalayanamitr
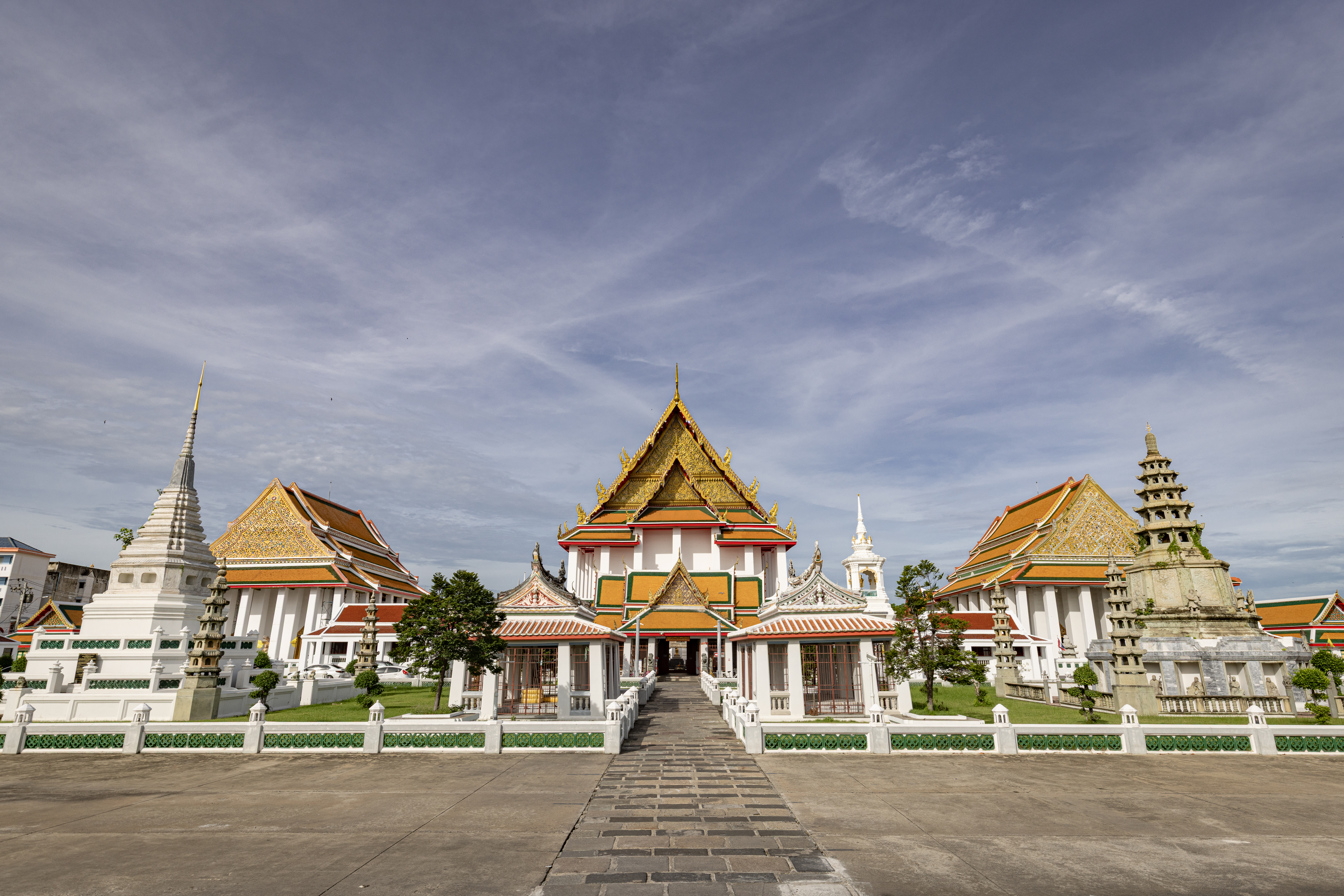

- Location within Bangkok

Religion
- Affiliation: Buddhism

Location
- Country: Thailand
- Coordinates: 13.739939°N 100.491226°E

Architecture
- Founder: Chaophraya Nikonbodin
- Completed: 1825; 201 years ago

Wat Kalayanamitr Varamahavihara (Thai: วัดกัลยาณมิตรวรมหาวิหาร, RTGS: Wat Kanlayanamit Woramahawihan, IPA: [wát kanlajaːnamít wɔːráʔmahǎːwíʔhǎːn]) is a Buddhist temple (wat) in Bangkok, Thailand. The temple is located in Wat Kanlaya sub-district, on the Thonburi bank of the Chao Phraya River. The temple was established in 1825 by Chaophraya Nikonbodin (born To, Thai: เจ้าพระยานิกรบดินทร์ (โต)), a wealthy Thai Chinese trader, who donated the temple to Rama III. Chaophraya Nikonbodin was an ancestor of the Kalayanamitr family, whose descendants include Saprang Kalayanamitr. A poem inscribed in the temple reads:

Golden Buddha image in the Palilai posture inside Wat Kalayanamitr Woramahawihan, a second-class royal temple in Bangkok, Thailand.

Wat Kalayanamitr Varamahavihara is one of three family temples of the Kalayanamitr family, along with Wat Rakhang and Wat Chakkrawatdirachawat Woramahawihan. The family name Kalayanamitr derives from a poem inscribed in the temple.

The ordination hall stands prominently on the riverbank, housing the massive Buddha image Phra Buddha Trai Rattananayok (พระพุทธไตรรัตนนายก), commonly known in Thai as Luang Pho To (หลวงพ่อโต, lit. 'Big Buddha') and among the ethnic Chinese as Sampokong (ซำปอกง, Chinese: 三寶佛公). It was once considered the largest Buddha image in Bangkok and shares its style with the Big Buddha at Wat Phanan Choeng in Phra Nakhon Si Ayutthaya. This makes the ordination hall notably large and highly visible from the river. Both Buddha images are revered as representations of both the Buddha and the Chinese admiral Zheng He. Thai people and those of Chinese descent firmly believe that paying respect to these images brings prosperity, good fortune, and safe journeys throughout the year.

Thai	Transcription	English
วัดกัลยาณมิตรคนสนิทกษัตริย์สร้าง งามสล้างรุ่งเรืองดั่งเมืองสรวง เป็นที่เคารพสักการะคนทั้งปวง เพราะในหลวงจักรีวงศ์ทรงอุ้มชูฯ	Wat Kalayanamitr khon sanit kasat sang Ngam salang rung rueang dang mueang suang Pen thi khaorop sakkara khon thang puang Phro nailuang chakkriwong song umchu	True friend temple was built by a close friend of the King; As glorious, beautiful, and prominent as the city of heaven It is respected and worshiped by all people Because it is cherished by the Chakri Dynasty King

== Gallery ==
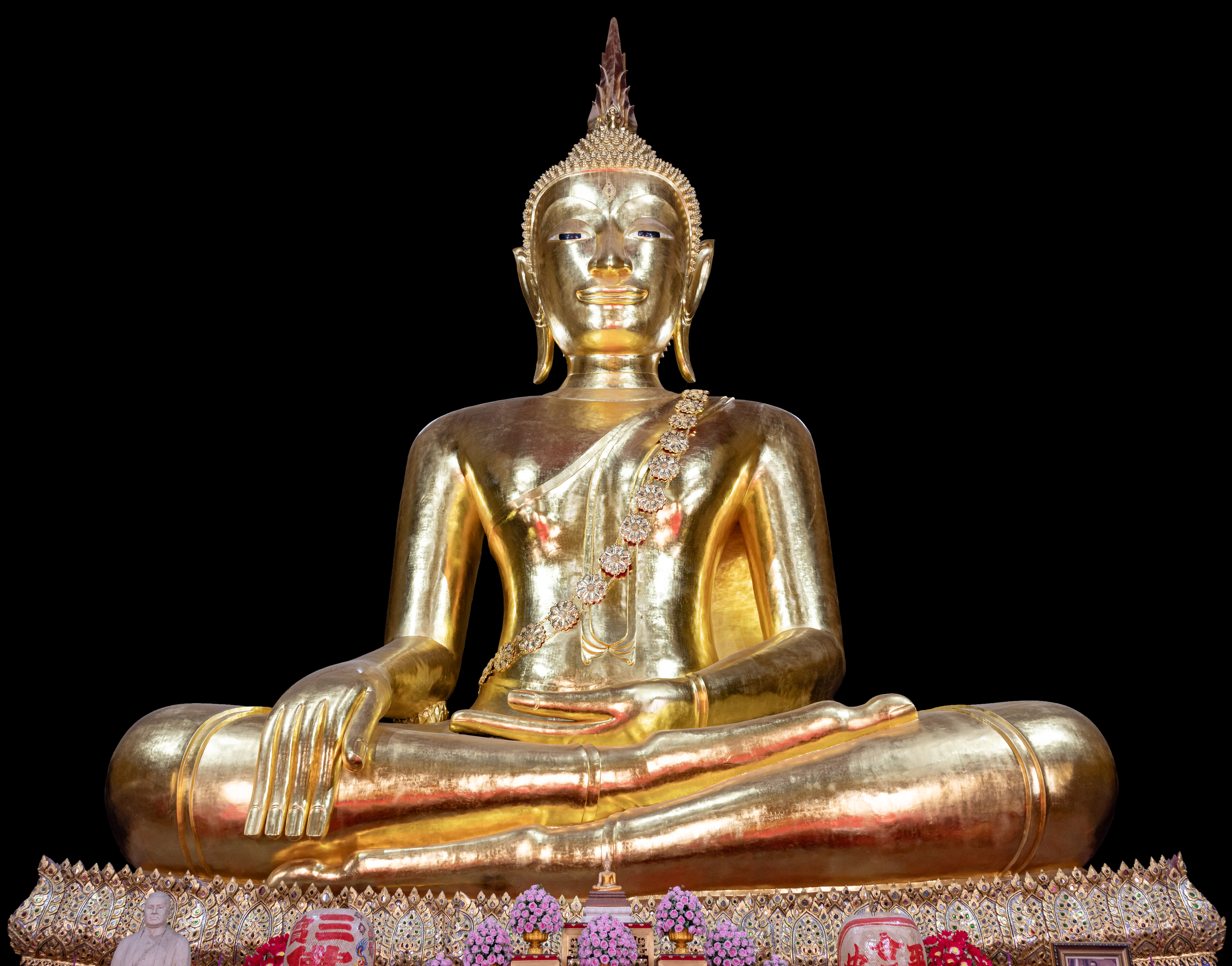
Phra Buddha Trai Rattananayok, also called Sampokong according to Teochew dialect

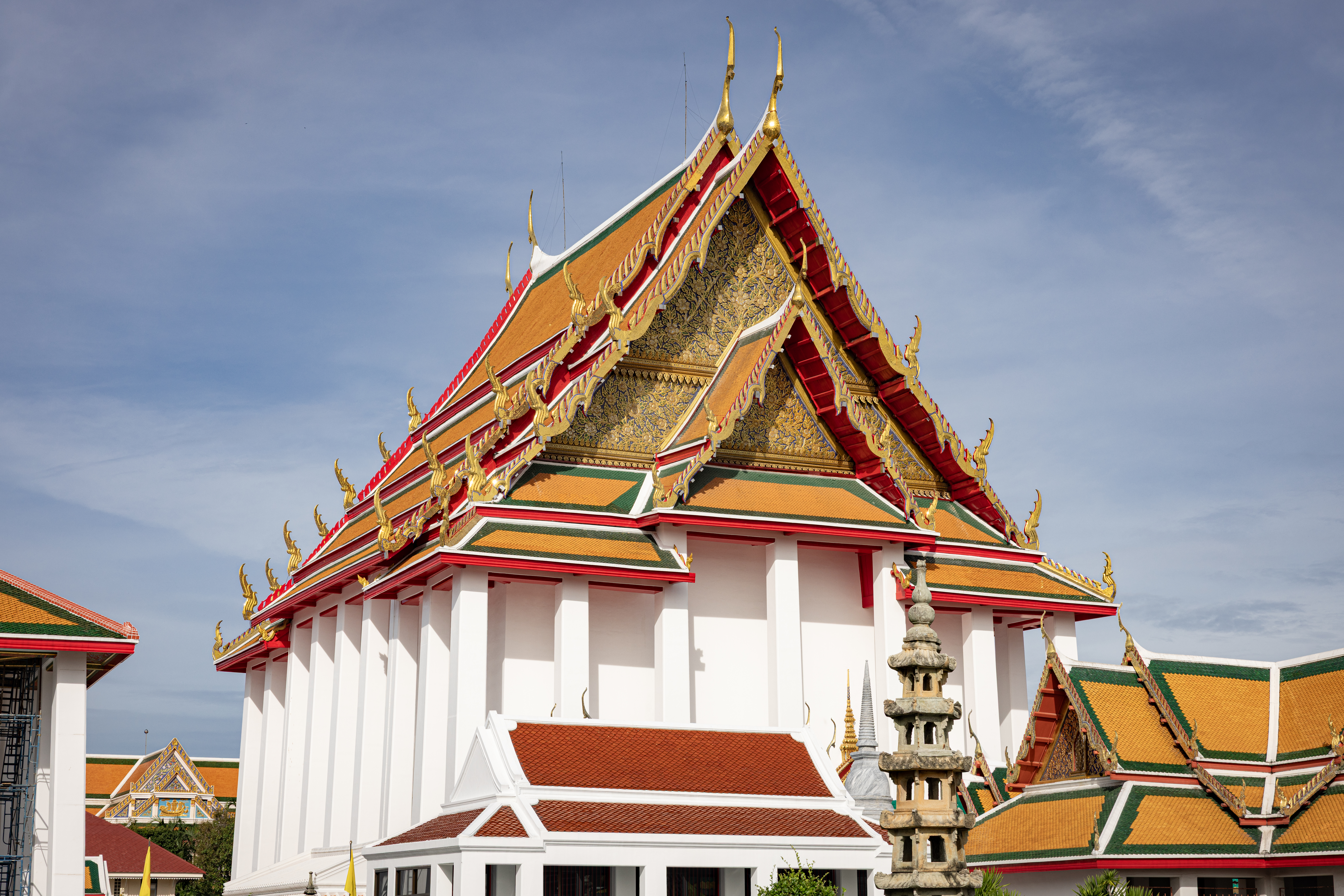
Phra Vihāra

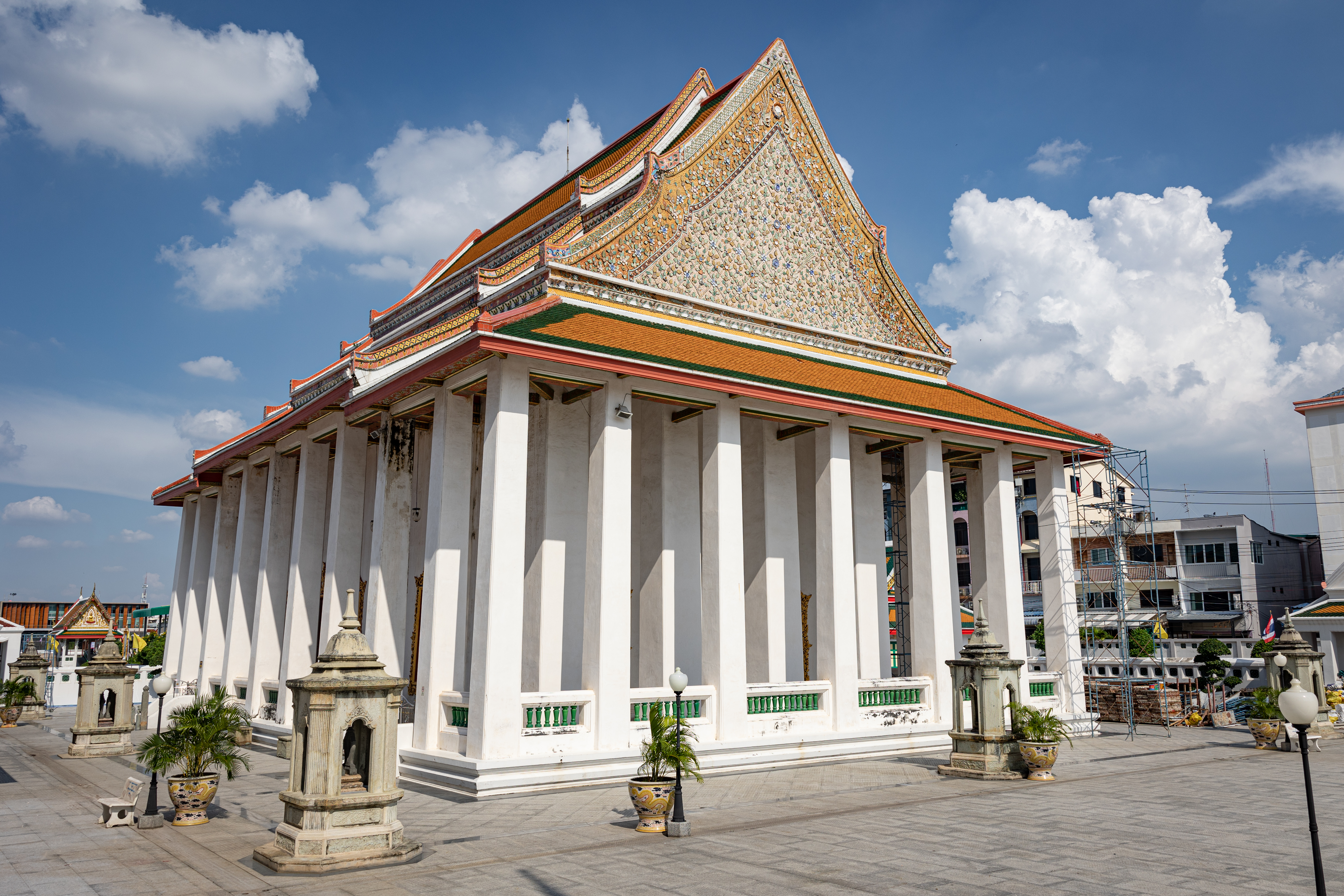
The ordination hall

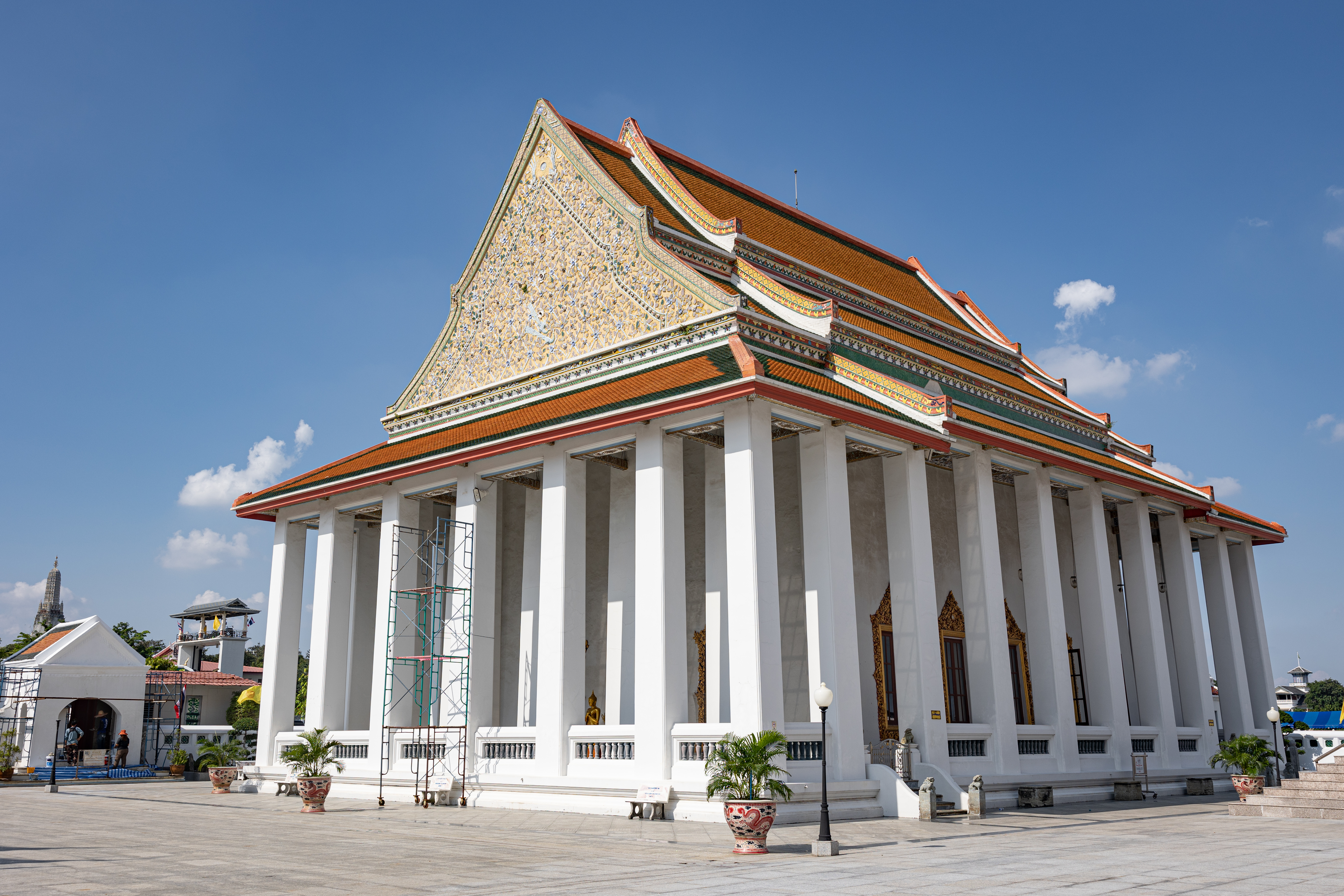
Sermon hall

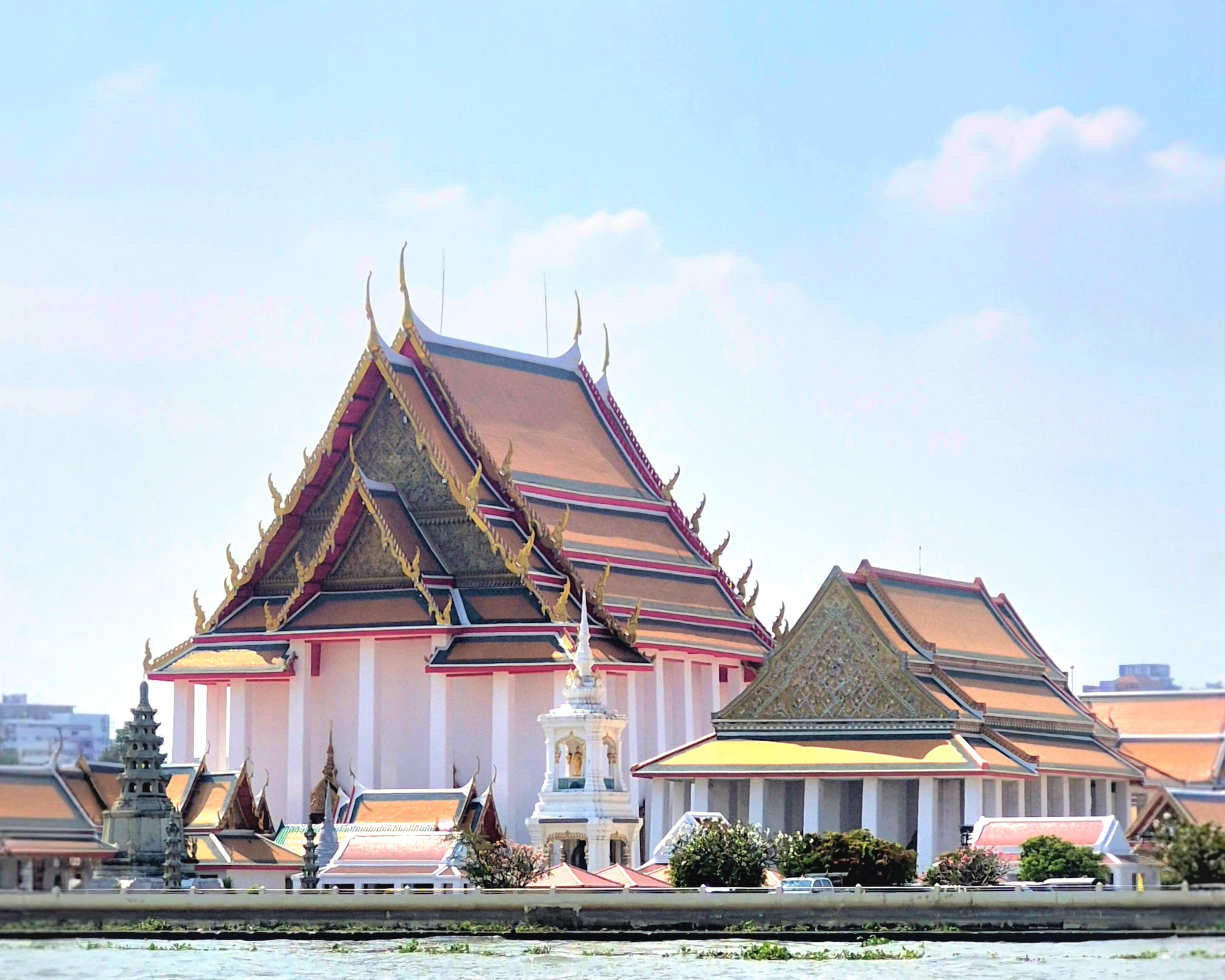
Seen from Chao Phraya River
