= Soraya =

- Gender: Female

Origin
- Origin: Arabic language
- Meaning: Pleiades
- Region of origin: Western Asia

Soraya (Persian: ثریا) is a feminine Arabic and Persian name. It is derived from the Arabic name for the Pleiades star cluster, Thurayyā or Suraya (Arabic: ثُرَيَّا). The name, also spelled Zoraya, is used in Spain and throughout the Spanish-speaking world with an origin in Al-Andalus. One historical example is Isabel de Solís, one of the final princesses of the Nasrid dynasty of Granada who converted to Islam and took the name Soraya or Zoraya. The name is also popular in Europe due to its association with Soraya Esfandiary-Bakhtiari, the second wife of Shah Mohammad Reza Pahlavi of Iran, who became a European socialite.

For phonological reasons, it is usually transcribed as Suraya in Afghanistan and Surayyo in Tajikistan.

== People ==
- Isabel de Solís (before 1471-1510), princess of the Nasrid dynasty of Islamic Spain who converted to Islam from Christianity and took the name Soraya or Zoraya before eventually returning to the use of her Christian name.
- Soraya (1969–2006), Colombian-American singer/songwriter
- Soraya Antonius (1932–2017) Palestinian writer, filmmaker, curator
- Soraya Bedjora Adiong (1944–2024), Filipino politician
- Soraya Alekozei (born 1955), Afghan-German interpreter and veteran
- Soraya Arnelas (born 1982), Spanish singer
- Soraya Ray Bañas (born 1989), Filipina singer, comedienne and actress better known as Kitkat
- Soraya Brigui (born 2005), singer and 2018 finalist of The Voice Kids (Belgium).
- Soraya Córdova (born 1959), Mexican politician
- Soraya Esfandiary-Bakhtiary (1932–2001), second wife of Mohammad Reza Pahlavi of Iran, known during her marriage as Queen Soraya
- Soraya Jiménez (1977–2013), Mexican weightlifter, first female athlete from Mexico to win an Olympic gold medal
- Soraya Manutchehri, subject of the 2008 film The Stoning of Soraya M.
- Soraya Marcano (born 1965), American visual artist
- Soraya Martínez Ferrada (born 1972), Chilean-born Canadian politician
- Soraya Milla (born 1989), French filmmaker
- Soraya Moraes (born 1973), Brazilian singer, four-time Latin Grammy Award winner
- Soraya Peke-Mason (born 1957/1958), New Zealand politician
- Soraya Post (born 1956), Swedish politician
- Soraya Sáenz de Santamaría (born 1971), Spanish politician
- Soraya Saga (born 1969), Japanese illustrator and video-game story-writer
- Soraya Sarhaddi Nelson, American journalist for National Public Radio
- Soraya Serajeddini (1960–2006), Kurdish-Iranian human rights activist
- Soraya Tarzi (1899–1968), wife of King Amanullah Khan of Afghanistan, known during her marriage as Queen Soraya
- Soraya Telles (born 1958), Brazilian former middle-distance runner
- Suraiya (1929–2004), Indian actress and singer
- Suraiya Hasan Bose (1928–2021), Indian textile conservator
- Suraiya Multanikar (born 1940), Pakistani singer
- Süreyya Ağaoğlu (1903–1989), first female lawyer in Turkish history

== Other ==
- Sorayya (newspaper), Persian weekly newspaper published between 1898 and 1900 in Cairo
- Soraya, a small lunar crater within Alphonsus
- Sooraya Qadir (Dust), a Marvel comic book character from the X-Men series
- Soraya, a song on the album Animals as Leaders by the band of the same name
- a sunflower variety
- Soraya Montenegro, a character in María la del Barrio portrayed by Itatí Cantoral
- Suraiya Nagar, village in Madhya Pradesh, India
- Soraya (satellite), an Iranian satellite launched in 2024
- Soraya (wasp), a genus of parasitoid wasp named after entomologist Soraya Alencar

== See also ==
- Saraya (disambiguation)
- Sabina (disambiguation)
- Sabrina (disambiguation)
- Sarah (disambiguation)
- Sarai (disambiguation) / or Serai / Saraj
- Sarina (disambiguation)
- Sarita (disambiguation)
- Sariya (disambiguation)
- Seraiah, a Hebrew name
- Seraya (disambiguation)
- Surya (disambiguation)
