= Suraya =

Suraya may refer to:

- Shabnam Surayyo (also spelled as Surayo, Suraya, or Soraya), a Tajik singer
- Jasmine Suraya Chin Xian Mei, a Malaysian television presenter and actress
- Suraya Bibi, a Pakistani politician from Upper Chitral District
- Suraya Dalil an Afghan physician and politician
- Suraya Marshall or Air Vice-Marshal Suraya Antonia Marshall, CBE (born 1973), a senior Royal Air Force officer
- Suraya Pakzad, an Afghan women's rights activist
- Suraya Qajar, a Soviet and Azerbaijani singer
- Suraya Sadeed, an Afghan-born American author, philanthropist, and activist
- Suraya Yaacob, a Malaysian politician

== See also ==
- Suraya Mosque (Spanish: Mezquita Suraya), a mosque located in Torreón, Coahuila, Mexico
- Suriya (disambiguation)
- Surya (disambiguation)
  - Surya, the Sun as well as the solar deity in Hinduism
- Sarai (disambiguation), including Serai and Saraj
- Saray (disambiguation)
- Saraya (disambiguation)
- Sarayu (disambiguation)
- Sariya (disambiguation)
- Seraiah, a Hebrew name
- Seraya (disambiguation)
- Soraya (disambiguation)
