= Sariya =

Sariya, Sariyah or Suriya may refer to:

== Given name ==
- Sariyah Hines, Canadian contestant on the reality music competition series The Launch
- Sariya Jones, participant on the TV series Tough Love
- Sariya Lakoba (1904–1939), Soviet woman who was the spouse of Nestor Lakoba
- Sariya Mirzhanova (1924–2000), Soviet Bashkiria linguist and Turkologist
- Sariya Sharp (born 1975), Canadian actress on the TV series You Can't Do That on Television
- Sariya Zakyrova (born 1964), Russian Olympic rower

== Places ==
- Barki Saraiya, a census town in Giridih district, Jharkhand, India
- Sariya (community development block), in Giridih district, Jharkhand, India
  - Suriya, Giridih, inhabited place not identified as a separate place in 2011 census, a part of Barki Saraiya

== See also ==
- Saraya (disambiguation)
- Sabina (disambiguation)
- Sabrina (disambiguation)
- Saira (disambiguation)
- Supriya
- Sarah (disambiguation)
- Sarai (disambiguation) / or Serai / Saraj
- Sarina (disambiguation)
- Serina (disambiguation)
- Sarita (disambiguation)
- Seraiah, a Hebrew name
- Seraya (disambiguation)
- Shakila (disambiguation)
- Shakira (disambiguation)
- Sierra (disambiguation)
- Soraya (disambiguation)
- Surya (disambiguation)
