= Shukri =

- Gender: Male

Origin
- Origin: Arabic
- Meaning: Thankful

Other names
- Alternative spelling: Shoukri, Shoukry, Choukri

Shukri (Arabic: شكري) (Turkish: Şükrü), alternatively Shoukri, Shoukry, Shokri, Choukri, Choucri, Chokri etc., is an Arabic name for males/females meaning 'thankful'. It is the masculine active participle of the Arabic verb شَكَرَ meaning 'to be thankful. The feminine form of the name is Shukriya or Shukria (شكريّة), or Şükriye in Turkish. It can be used as either a given name or surname. A similar Arabic name is Shakir (Feminine form: Shakira).

== Given name ==
- Choukri Abahnini (born 1960), pole vault athlete from Tunisia
- Shukri al-Asali (1868–1916), Ottoman parliamentarian and Syrian political activist
- Shukri al-Quwatli (1891–1967), president of Syria from 1943 to 1949 and from 1955 to 1958
- Choucri Atafi (born 1981), Moroccan Greco-Roman wrestler
- Chokri Belaid (1964–2013), Tunisian lawyer and politician
- Chokri El Ouaer (born 1966), former Tunisian football goalkeeper
- Shukri Ghanem (born 1942), former General Secretary of the People's Committee in Libya
- Shukri Hussein Gure (born 1978), Somali politician
- Shukri Lawrence, Palestinian fashion designer and artist
- Shukri Mustafa, Egyptian Khariji
- Choukri Ouaïl, Algerian footballer
- Shoukry Sarhan (1925–1997), Egyptian actor
- Shukri Rahim, Malaysian cricketer
- Shukri Toefy (born 1984), Cape Town based film producer

== Surname ==
- Abdel Rahman Shokry, Egyptian poet
- Ahmed Shoukry, Egyptian footballer
- Alawi Shukri, Emirati cricketer
- Andrew Wagih Shoukry (born 1990), Egyptian professional squash player
- Artin Bey Shoukry, Egyptian Foreign Minister from 1844 to 1850
- Hassan Bey Shukri, co-founded the Muslim National Associations (MNA)
- Ibrahim Shoukry (1916–2008), Egyptian politician
- Islam Shokry, Egyptian footballer currently playing for Egyptian club "Tersana"
- Javid Shokri, Iranian footballer
- Mahmoud Shokry, chief of staff of the Egyptian Army
- Mamdouh Shoukri, seventh President and Vice-Chancellor of York University
- Mohamed Choukri (1935–2003), Moroccan author and novelist
- Mohammad Shukri (cricketer) (born 1986), Malaysian cricketer
- Monia Chokri (born 1982), Canadian actress
- Moustapha Choukri (1945–1980), Moroccan footballer
- Muhammad Shukri (1861–1919), Christian convert who became a missionary by the name of Johannes Avetaranian
- Nancy Shukri, Malaysian politician
- Peter Shoukry (born 1986), Egyptian-American model and artist
- Sameh Shoukry (born 1952), Egyptian career diplomat
- Shoukri brothers, Andre Khalef Shoukri and Ihab Shoukri, a pair of Egyptian-Northern Irish loyalist paramilitaries
- Suhaizi Shukri (born 1979), Malaysian football referee

== Middle name ==
- Emile Shukri Habibi (1922 - 1996) Palestinian/Israeli Arab writer and communist politician
- Ezzedine Choukri Fishere (born 1966), Egyptian novelist, diplomat and academic

== See also ==
- Shukri, Sudan, a village
- Shokri Kola, a village in Iran
