= Suraiya (disambiguation) =

Suraiya (1929–2004) was an Indian actress and playback singer who worked in Hindi films.

Suraiya may also refer to:

== People ==
- Suraiya Azmin (born 1999), Bangladeshi cricketer
- Suraiya Begum, Bangladeshi civil servant
- Suraiya Hasan Bose (1928–2021), Indian textile conservator, textile designer, and manufacturer
- Suraiya Faroqhi (born 1941), German scholar and Ottoman historian
- Suraiya Jatoi, Pakistani politician
- Suraiya Khanum, Pakistani singer
- Suraiya Multanikar (born 1940), Pakistani singer
- Suraiya Shahab (1945–2019), Pakistani newscaster, poet, and novelist
- Jug Suraiya, Indian journalist, author and columnist
- Kamala Suraiya (1934-2009), Indian author and poet

== Other ==
- Suraiya Nagar, village in Bhopal district, Madhya Pradesh, India
- Suraiya (film), 2020 Indian Bengali-language short film by Anirudho Rasel

== See also ==
- Sariya (disambiguation)
- Pagli Suraiya, 2015 album by Sania Sultana Liza
- Sariah
- Seraiah
