= Sabinia =

Sabinia may refer to:

== Geology ==
- Sabinia microcontinent, a fragment of continental crust that underlies the Sabine Uplift, Texas and Louisiana

== Paleontology ==
- Sabinia (bivalve), a genus of rudist bivalves in the superfamily Hippuritacea

== Surname ==
- The Sabinia gens, a minor plebeian family at ancient Rome

== See also ==
- Sabina (disambiguation)
- Santa Sabina (disambiguation)
- Sabine (disambiguation)
- Sabrina (disambiguation)
