= Saraya =

Saraya may refer to:

== People ==
- Saraya Bevis (born 1992), English professional wrestler, formerly known as Paige
- Sweet Saraya (born 1971), English professional wrestler, mother of Saraya

== Places ==
- Saraya, Pazardzhik Province, a village in southern Bulgaria
- Saraya, Senegal, a small town with commune status in south-east Senegal
- Saraya Department, one of the 45 departments of Senegal
- El Saraya (neighborhood), a neighborhood in Alexandria, Egypt
- Seraya (also spelled Saraya), a historical building in Nazareth, Israel

== Other uses ==
- Saraya (band), a former American rock band
- Saraya (newspaper), an Arabic online newspaper based in Amman, Jordan
- Saraya Aqaba, a Jordanian private shareholding company
- Saraya Ahl al-Sham, a rebel alliance active in the Syrian Civil War
- Saraya, the Ogre's Daughter
- Saray (building), also known as saraya

== See also ==
- Sarai (disambiguation), including Serai and Saraj
- Saray (disambiguation)
- Sarayu (disambiguation)
- Sariya (disambiguation)
- Seraiah, a Hebrew name
- Seraya (disambiguation)
- Soraya (disambiguation)
- Suraya, a given name
