= Seraya (disambiguation) =

Seraya or Serayah may refer to:

- Seraya, historical building in Nazareth, Israel
- Seraya Shapshal (1873–1961), hakham and leader of the Crimean and then the Polish and Lithuanian Crimean Karaites (Karaim) community
- Serayah McNeill (born 1995), American actress, model and singer also known by the mononym Serayah
- Seraya Energy, licensed electricity retailer in Singapore
- Seraya, trade name for timber from various Shorea and Parashorea species

== See also ==
- Sarah (disambiguation)
- Saraya (disambiguation)
- Sarai (disambiguation) / or Serai / Saraj
- Saray (disambiguation)
- Sabina (disambiguation)
- Sabrina (disambiguation)
- Sarita (disambiguation)
- Sariya (disambiguation)
- Seraiah, a Hebrew name
