= Saray (disambiguation) =

Saray, or seray (also spelt saraya or seraya), is a Turkish word from Persian: سرای, romanized: sarāy, lit. 'palace', traditionally translated as serail or seraglio via Italian influence. The term is usually referred to:

- Saray (building), a castle/palace/headquarters in the Ottoman Empire,

or, per derivation:

- Saray (harem), the sequestered living quarters used by wives and concubines in an Ottoman household

It may also refer to:

== Buildings ==
- Palace of the Shirvanshahs is a 15th-century palace built by the Shirvanshahs and described by UNESCO as "one of the pearls of Azerbaijan's architecture"
- Bogdan Saray, an Eastern Orthodox church in Istanbul, Turkey
- Ismailiyya Palace is a historical building that currently serves as the Presidium of the Academy of Sciences of Azerbaijan
- Gulustan Palace during the Soviet era is the main state convention center of the Azerbaijani government
- Grand Serail, Ottoman barracks and seat of the prime minister of Lebanon
- Petit Serail, an administrative building in Ottoman Beirut, destroyed in 1951
- Jumeirah Zabeel Saray, a resort located on the west crescent of The Palm in Dubai, United Arab Emirates
- Agha Gahraman Mirsiyab Saray is an 18th-century Azerbaijani saray and caravanserai located in Karabakh region of Azerbaijan
- Seraya, Nazareth, an 18th-century palace built by Sheikh Daher al-Umar in Nazareth.

== Places ==
=== Azerbaijan ===
- Saray, Absheron
- Saray, Qubadli

=== Bosnia and Herzegovina ===
- Sarajevo, the capital city and largest urban centre of Bosnia and Herzegovina

=== Iran ===
- Saray, East Azerbaijan
- Saray, Marand, East Azerbaijan Province
- Saray, Osku, East Azerbaijan Province
- Saray, Hamadan
- Saray, Isfahan
- Saray-ye Sheykh Ali
- Saray Mohammad Hoseyn

=== Iraq ===
- Saray Azadi, a square in the old town centre in the Kurdish city of Sulaymania

=== Turkey ===
- Saray, Kahramankazan, a neighbourhood in Kahramankazan district of Ankara Province
- Saray, Tekirdağ, a district and municipality in Tekirdağ Province
- Saray, Van, a district and municipality in Van Province
- Sarayburnu, a promontory in Istanbul, where the Topkapı Palace stands
- Bahçesaray, Van, a district and municipality in Van Province, literally "garden palace"

=== Ukraine ===
- Bakhchysaray (Bağçasaray/Bahçesaray), the former capital of the Crimean Khanate, literally "garden palace", and the name-sake Raion.

== People ==
- Saray García (born 1984), Spanish footballer
- Seray Kaya (born 1991), Turkish actress
- Tum Saray (born 1992), Cambodian footballer
- Saray Mulk Khanum (1343–1406), Empress of the Timurid Empire as the chief consort of Timur

== Other uses ==
- Saray Masjid, is a mosque of the 15th century, which is included in Shirvanshah's palace complex in Baku, Azerbaijan
- Saray helva, a popular Turkish confectionery
- Saray (military unit), a military unit in the Arab world

== See also ==
- Sarah (disambiguation)
- Sarai (disambiguation)
- Saraya (disambiguation)
- Seraiah, a Hebrew name
- Seraya (disambiguation)
- Saray hamam, is bath houses, dated back to the 15th century and are a part of the Shirvanshahs' Palace Complex in Azerbaijan
- Galatasaray (disambiguation)
- Caravanserai, a kind of roadside inn
