= Chekira =

Chekira may refer to:

- Chekira Lockhart Hypolite, Dominican politician
- Chekira Airfield, an abandoned airfield in Tunisia

== See also ==
- Chakira (disambiguation)
- Shakira (disambiguation)
