= Shukriya =

Shukriya or Shukria (Arabic: شكريّة) is an Arabic name for females meaning 'thankful'. It is the feminine active participle of the Arabic verb, شَكَرَ, meaning 'to be thankful'. The masculine form of the name is Shukri (Arabic: شكري) (Turkish: Şükrü), alternatively Shoukri, Shoukry, Shokri, Choukri, Choucri, Chokri etc., or Şükrü in Turkish. It can be used as either a given name or surname. It is also an Urdu word (شکریہ) meaning 'thank you'.

People with the given name include:

- Shukria Asil, Afghan women's rights activist
- Shukria Barakzai, Afghan politician, journalist and feminist

== See also ==
- Shukriya (disambiguation)
- Shukria clan, a large clan of Arab nomads
