= Isabel de Solís =

Concubine of the Sultan of Grenada

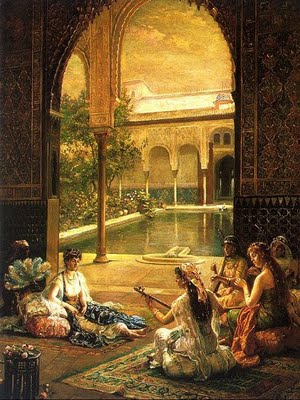
- Isabel de Solis by Filippo Baratti
- Born: before 1471; Aguilar de la Frontera, Kingdom of Castile
- Died: after 1510; Seville, Kingdom of Castile
- Spouse: Abu'l-Hasan Ali of Granada (died 1485)
- Issue: Juan de Granada; Fernando de Granada
- House: Nasrid (by marriage)
- Father: Sancho Jiménez de Solís
- Religion: Roman Catholic (reconverted)

Isabel de Solís (Arabic: ثريا الرومية Thoraya, Soraya, Zoraya) (before 1471 – after 1510) was the slave concubine and later the wife of Abu l-Hasan Ali, Sultan of Granada. Originally a Christian from Castile, she converted to Islam under the name of Zoraya. She exerted a strong influence over her spouse. However, after the fall of Granada, she took up the name of Isabel again and reverted back to Catholicism.

== Life ==
De Solís was the daughter of Castilian nobleman Sancho Jiménez de Solís. When Granada's new king refused to continue paying tribute to the crown of Castile, Christian armies began raiding the Kingdom of Granada. In reprisal, Muhammad XII of Granada (El Zagal), the sultan's brother, began conducting raids on Castile.

=== Granada ===
On a raid toward Aguilar in Castile on 29 September 1471, Isabel was taken prisoner. She was taken to the Alhambra palace in Granada, and sold as a slave to Abu l-Hasan Ali, the sultan of Granada. She worked as a chambermaid in the Nasrid harem of the palace of the sultan. She was noticed by Abu l-Hasan Ali, who fell in love with her, married her and gave her the Daralcotola Palace and several other gifts, and proclaimed that prayers should be said to her in the mosques. Upon de Solís' conversion to Islam, she took the name Turai, Soraya or Zoraya.

The Sultan lived with Zoraya in the Comares Tower of Alhambra, abandoning his first spouse Aixa. Zoraya had two sons with the sultan, Nasr and Said, who were named royal princes from the start, causing Aixa to worry that the sultan would have his sons with Zoraya favored in the succession before his sons with Aixa.

Because Aixa (known as Fatima) was a descendant of the Prophet Mohammed, the people, especially the religious leaders, saw the marriage between Zoraya and the sultan as a scandal, and the opposition caused a civil war in Granada in 1482.

Abu l-Hasan Ali was eventually deposed by his first wife Aixa, with the help of Ibrahim Aliatar, the warlord of Loja. De Solís was taken captive by the Aixa faction and allowed to live, on condition that Abu l-Hasan Ali give up the throne to his son Boabdil.

In 1483, Abu l-Hasan Ali retook the throne, and reigned for another two years. After the death of her husband, he was succeeded by his brother Muhammad XII of Granada (El Zagal), who abdicated in favor of his nephew Boabdil in 1486. It appears Zoraya and her son became wards of El Zagal. When El Zagal surrendered to Ferdinand and Isabella in December 1489, and was given lands and estates in return, the rights of Zoraya and her sons were protected by El Zagal who provided land from his own estates for them. When El Zagal left for North Africa in 1491, Zoraya chose to remain.

=== Later life ===
After the defeat of Granada in 1492, Zoraya and her two sons attracted the attention of Ferdinand and Isabella. She is noted to have lived in Cordoba in 1494, still a Muslim under the name Zoraya. Reportedly, she unsuccessfully asked Ferdinand and Isabella through her secretary Hernando de Zafra that her sons be permitted to be exiled to North Africa and remain Muslims. Her sons converted to Catholicism and took the names Juan de Granada and Fernando de Granada. She herself was asked first by her sons and then by the king and queen to reconvert to Catholicism, which she eventually did, taking back her original name Isabel, and becoming known as Isabel de Granada and Queen Isabel. She is last mentioned living in Seville in 1510.

== Fiction ==
Isabel de Solís appears as a character in the historical fiction work People of the Book by Geraldine Brooks, as does Abu l-Hasan Ali. She also is prominent character in the historical drama series Isabel, along with Abu l-Hasan Ali.
