= Sarai =

Sarai, Serai, or Saraj may refer to:

== Places ==
- Sarai (city), a large medieval city, and the capital city of the Golden Horde
- Saray-Jük, the Little Sarai of the Golden Horde

=== Azerbaijan ===
- Sarai Village, an old Turkic village in Absheron, Baku
- Saray, Qubadli a village in Karabakh, occupied by Armenians
- Sarai Masjid, a 15th-century mosque in Shirvanshah's palace complex in Baku
- Gulustan Palace, the main state convention center of the Azerbaijani government, referred to as Gülüstan Sarai during the Soviet era

=== Afghanistan ===
- Chaga Serai, (Asadabad) in the Kunar River valley, at the confluence of the Pech River

=== Bangladesh ===
- Sarai Union, a subdivision in Bandarban District, Bangladesh

=== Eritrea ===
- Serai, An ancient province in the state of Eritrea

=== India ===
- Aminagar Sarai, Uttar Pradesh
- Ber Sarai, Delhi
- Begusarai, Bihar
- Sarai Khas, a village in Jalandhar District of Punjab,
- Jia Sarai, Delhi
- Kheta Sarai, Uttar Pradesh
- Laheria Sarai, Darbhanga, Bihar
- Mughal Sarai, a popular railway junction in Chandauli district of Uttar Pradesh
- Mughal Serai, Punjab
- Mughal Serai, Doraha, Punjab
- Sarai, Raebareli, a village in Raebareli district, Uttar Pradesh
- Sarai Aquil, Uttar Pradesh
- Sarai Kale Khan (disambiguation), Delhi
- Sarai Mir, Uttar Pradesh
- Sarai Rohilla railway station, Delhi
- Sarai Shishgaran, Uttar Pradesh
- Sulem Sarai, Allahabad, Uttar Pradesh
- Nampally Sarai, Andhra Pradesh
- Yusuf Sarai, a locality in Delhi
- Sarai metro station, Delhi, India

=== Iran ===
- Sarai Village, East Azerbaijan
- Sarai, East Azerbaijan, Iran
- Sarai, Isfahan, Iran
- Sarai, Iran, Kermanshah Province

=== Iraq ===
- Sarai Mosque, late 12th century mosque in Baghdad, Iraq
- Zuqaq al-Sarai, an old street in downtown Baghdad

=== North Macedonia ===
- Saraj municipality, a municipality in Greater Skopje
  - Saraj, Skopje, a village near Skopje; seat of the Saraj municipality
- Saraj, Bosilovo, a village
- Saraj (Resen), a neoclassical estate in Resen built by Ahmed Niyazi Bey

=== Pakistan ===
- Sarai Alamgir, a city in the Gujrat District, Punjab
- Sarai Alamgir Tehsil, a tehsil in the Gujrat District, Punjab
- Sarai Sidhu, a city in the Khanewal District, Punjab
- Serai Naurang, a town in Lakki Marwat District, Khyber Pakhtunkhwa province

=== Russia ===
- Sarai, Russia, name of several inhabited localities in Russia

=== Turkey ===
- Saray, Van, also spelled Sarai

== People ==
- Sarai, the original name of the biblical Sarah
- Sarai (rapper) (born 1981), American female rapper
- Sarai (tribe), a Jat clan from Punjab, mostly of the Sikh faith
- Sarai Bareman, Samoan New Zealand born former footballer
- Sarai Givaty (born 1982), Israeli actress and model
- Bijan Djir-Sarai (born 1976), Iranian-born German politician
- Reza Saraj (1965–2024), Iranian politician who was the head of foreign intelligence for the Intelligence Organization of the Islamic Revolutionary Guard Corps

== Other ==
- Sarai (resting place) or caravanserai, a caravan station where travelers would rest
- Sarai, a common name of Shorea robusta, a tree native to the Indian subcontinent
- The Sarai Programme at CSDS (the Centre for the Study of Developing Societies, an Indian research institute for the social sciences and humanities in Delhi)
- Sarai Records, an independent label founded by Teena Marie
- Multani script, or Sarai, an obsolete abugida writing system for the Saraiki language

== See also ==
- Saray (disambiguation)
- Sarah (disambiguation)
