= Sarit =

Sarit is a given name. It may be a Hebrew female given name, שרית. Notable people with the name include:

== Female ==
- Sarit Hadad (born 1978), Israeli musician
- Sarit Kraus (born 1960), Israeli academic and computer scientist
- Sarit Shenar (born 1983), Israeli football player
- Sarit Sivan, Israeli biotechnology engineer
- Sarit Yishai-Levi Israeli journalist and writer, The Beauty Queen of Jerusalem

== Male ==
- Sarit Kumar Das, Indian academic
- Sarit Thanarat (1908–1963), Thai military officer and politician

== See also ==
- Sarita (disambiguation)
