= Abid Hasan =

Indian National Army officer and diplomat

Major Abid Hasan "Safrani"
- Born: Zain-al-Abdin Hasan; 11 April 1911; Hyderabad, Hyderabad State, British India (now in Telangana, India)
- Died: 9 May 1984 (aged 72); Hyderabad, Andhra Pradesh, India (now in Telangana, India)
- Education: St. George's Grammar School
- Employer(s): Indian National Army (1942–1945); Indian Foreign Service (1948–1969)
- Notable work: Shubh Sukh Chain, Jai Hind

Indian Ambassador to Denmark

Indian Ambassador to Egypt

Abid Hasan Safrani, IFS, born Zain-al-Abdin Hasan, was an officer of the Indian National Army (INA) and later, after 1947, an Indian diplomat. He famously introduced the slogan 'Jai Hind', coined by Chempakaraman Pillai, which translates to 'victory belongs to India' that is used for official and semi-official purposes including army salutes, moral upliftment and in pop culture.

Born to an anti-colonialist family in Hyderabad, Abid Hasan was brought up in India and later went to Germany to train as an engineer. While he was a student in Germany during World War II, Abid Hasan met Subhas Chandra Bose and decided to join the Indische Legion. Hasan would later serve as Bose's personal secretary and interpreter while Bose was in Germany. Hasan also sailed with Bose in the German U-boat U-180 in 1943 on Bose's voyage to South East Asia. Over the course of the reformation of the INA and its campaigns in the south east Asian theatre, Hasan rose to be a Major in the Azad Hind Fauj. It was also during this that he adopted "Safrani", after the holy Hindu colour of Saffron, to his name as a mark of communal harmony.

After repatriation to India at the end of the war, Abid Hasan was released following the end of the INA trials in 1946 and joined the Indian National Congress briefly. After partition, Hasan chose to settle in Hyderabad and joined the nascent Indian Foreign Service. Over a long diplomatic career, Hasan served as the Indian Ambassador to a number of countries including Egypt and Denmark before retiring in 1969 and settling back in Hyderabad. Abid Hasan Saffrani died in 1984.

On suggestion of Abid Hasan, the INA adopted "Jai Hind" as its slogan; The term "Jai Hind" had been coined by Chempaka Raman Pillai . In the 1940s, the INA leaders decided to devise a religion-agnostic greeting for its soldiers: Thakur Yashwant Singh suggested "Hindustan ki Jai", but Hasan felt this was too long and suggested "Jai Hind" as an alternative, which was unanimously accepted. The term emerged as a national slogan after India's independence.

Netaji Bose's nephew Aurobindo Bose later married Safrani's niece. Her name is Suraiya Hasan Bose. She was the daughter of elder brother of Abid Hasan safrini by name Badrul Hasan, who worked with Gandhiji. Mr Abid Hasan died on April 9, 1984.

== Scholarly activities ==
Hasan was also a scholar who spent long hours with his Persian and Urdu poetry. His Hindi-Urdu translation of Jana Gana Mana with the music from Ram Singh Thakuri, became Shubh Sukh Chain, the anthem of the Provisional Government of Free India. Abid Hasan Safrani died on 9 April 1984 in Hyderabad.

== See also ==
- Syed Akbaruddin
