= Sainte-Sabine (disambiguation) =

Sainte-Sabine is a commune in the Côte-d'Or department in eastern France.

Sainte-Sabine (French for Saint Sabina) may also refer to:

- Sainte-Sabine, Chaudière-Appalaches, Quebec, Canada, a municipality
- Sainte-Sabine, Montérégie, Quebec, Canada, a municipality
- Sainte-Sabine-Born, a commune in the Dordogne department, southwestern France
- Sainte-Sabine-sur-Longève, a commune in the Sarthe department, Pays-de-la-Loire, north-western France

== See also ==
- Sabine (disambiguation)
- Sabina (disambiguation)
- Santa Sabina (disambiguation)
