= Karnali =

Karnali may refer to:

== Places in Nepal ==
- Karnali Bridge, a bridge over the Karnali River in Nepal
- Karnali Highway, a vital transport link in Nepal
- Karnali Province, a federal province in Nepal
- Karnali River also known as Ghaghara and Sarayu, a river in Nepal and India originating in the Tibetan Plateau
- Karnali Zone, a former administrative zone in Nepal

== Other ==
- Karnali Air, a defunct airline that operated in Nepal

== See also ==
- Karnali Blues, a novel written by Nepali Buddhi Sagar
- Sarayu (disambiguation)
