= Sehr =

Sehr is a surname. Notable people with the surname include:

- Markus Sehr (born 1977), German film director
- Walter Sehr (1904–?), Austrian bobsledder

== See also ==
- Sehr Mahmood, 2006 winner of Miss Pakistan World
- Sehr Bagla, village
- Sehra (disambiguation)
