= Sabine (disambiguation) =

Sabine refers a member of the Sabines tribe of ancient Italy, their territory, which still bears the ancient tribe's name, and their language.

== People ==
- Sabine (given name)
- Sabine (surname)
- Sabine (musician), Lebanese singer and actress Sabine Fouchaux (born 1988)

== Places ==
=== Canada ===
- Sabine Bay, Nunavut
- Cape Sabine, Nunavut
- Sabine Island (Nunavut)

=== United States ===
- Cape Sabine (Alaska)
- Mount Sabine (Alaska)
- Sabine National Wildlife Refuge, Louisiana
- Sabine Parish, Louisiana
- Sabine County, Texas
- Sabine National Forest, Texas
- Sabine Lake, a salt water estuary on the Texas-Louisiana border
- Sabine Pass, the natural outlet of Sabine Lake into the Gulf of Mexico
- Sabine River (Texas-Louisiana)
- Sabine, West Virginia, an unincorporated community
- Sabine Free State, anachronistic name for an area of disputed ownership between Spain and the United States from 1806 to 1821

=== Elsewhere on Earth ===
- Sabine Glacier, Graham Land, Antarctica
- Sabine, Queensland, Australia, a locality
- Sabine Island, Greenland
- Sabina (region), Italy, also called the Sabine Hills or the Sabines
- Sabine River, New Zealand
- Sabine Valley, New Zealand
- Sabine Land, Norway, a land area on the east coast of Spitsbergen, Svalbard
- Sabine Islands, Svalbard, Norway

=== Outer space ===
- Sabine (crater), a lunar crater
- 665 Sabine, an asteroid

== Animals ==
- Sabine shiner (Notropis sabinae), a fish
- Sabine's gull (Xema sabini), a bird
- Sabine's puffback (Dryoscopus sabini), a bird
- Sabine's spinetail (Rhaphidura sabini), a bird

== Businesses ==
- Sabine Transportation Company, a shipping company in Cedar Rapids, Iowa, United States
- Bethlehem Sabine Shipyard, Port Arthur, Texas, United States, a former shipyard which opened in 1985
- SABINE Inc., manufacturer of professional audio equipment, e. g. Electronic tuner#Types AX3000

== Entertainment ==
- Sabine (TV series), a German television series
- Sabine Cheng, a character in the animated series Miraculous: Tales of Ladybug & Cat Noir
- Sabine Strohem, a fictional character from the Griffin and Sabine series
- Sabine Wren, a fictional character from the Star Wars Rebels TV series
- Sabine, a fictional character in The Order of the Stick, a webcomic

== Ships ==
- HMS Sabine, several Royal Navy ships
- USS Sabine (1855), a sailing frigate in service during the American Civil War
- USS Sabine (AO-25), a United States Navy fleet oiler, launched in 1940

== Other uses ==
- Sabine (olive), an olive grown in Corsica
- Sabine baronets, an extinct title in the Baronetage of England
- Sabine Field, a sports stadium in Northfield, Vermont, United States
- Cyclone Sabine, which struck north-western Europe in February 2020
- Sabine Normal and Industrial Institute (1903–1928) in Converse, Louisiana

== See also ==
- Sainte-Sabine (disambiguation)
- Sabine Expedition, a volunteer expedition to protect the US/Mexico border in 1806
- Sabine Hall (Garden City, Kansas), United States, a historic building
- Sabine Hall (Tappahannock, Virginia), a historic building near Warsaw, Virginia
- Sabine Hill, a historic home in Elizabethton, Tennessee, United States
- William H. Sabine House, a historic house in Syracuse, New York, United States
- Sabina (disambiguation)
