= Amr Singh =

South African director (born 1985)

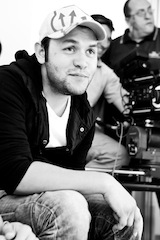
- Born: 26 April 1985 (age 40); Cape Town, South Africa
- Occupations: Music video director; film director; chief creative officer
- Years active: 2006–present
- Website: www.amrsingh.com

Amr Singh (born 26 April 1985) is a film director, and creative partner at Fort. He is currently based in Johannesburg, South Africa.

== Early life ==
Amr Singh was born in Cape Town, South Africa on 26 April 1985. He attended the University of Cape Town in 2003 where he graduated with degrees (BA Hons) in media studies, anthropology and film.

== Career ==
While students, Amr Singh and Shukri Toefy founded Fort, where Singh now serves as co-founder, creative partner and film director.

Best known for his music videos and commercials, Singh has since worked with international celebrities, directors and talent, including Nigerian singer-songwriter and musician D'banj, actor, writer, comedian and producer Kevin Hart, director and producer Leslie Small, and Swedish singer-songwriter and music producer Maher Zain, among others.

=== Unwritten: A Visual Journey of Nepal ===
In 2014, filming began on Unwritten: A Visual Journey of Nepal, an arthouse short film shot in the Kathmandu Valley, Nepal only months before the Ghorka earthquakes. A film project started with Shukri Toefy under the Rainmakers Journal thought leadership platform, Unwritten is a powerful cinematic account of Toefy's journey across the Kathmandu Valley as told by the pages of his journal. Along his journey he meets with artisans, musicians, spiritualists, scholars, and survivors of a bygone era where the knowledge handed down from generation to generation was seen as a rite of passage, in search of lessons he can apply to his own life.

Unwritten has received critical acclaim in the international film category with Official Selection at Roma Cinema Doc, Largo Film Awards and the 10th Annual Bali International Film Festival, and has won at the 2016 Amsterdam Film Festival and Hollywood International Independent Documentary Awards.

== Filmography ==
=== Short films ===
- Unwritten: A Visual Journey of Nepal (2016)

=== Music videos ===
- Maher Zain – Close to You (2016)
- Maher Zain – The Power (2016)
- Da L.E.S – Heaven (2014)
- AKA – Congratulate (2014)
- Danny K – Brown Eyes (2013)

=== Television commercials ===
- South African Airways – Next Beginnings (2016)
- Brutal Fruit – Blesser (2016)
- Nedbank – Athlete (2016)
- Menlyn Park – Beautiful Day (2016)
- MTV Base – My Base My Life (2016)
- South African Airways – Carrier of Dreams (2015)
- YAS Mall – The Race (2015)
- Etisalat – Photobook (2014)

== Awards and nominations ==
List of awards and nominations
Year	Award / Film Festival	Category	Work	Result	Ref(s)
2013	CFP-E & SHOTS Young Director Award	Non-European	Sizalo – Flower Seller	Nominated	
2014	Channel O Music Video Awards	Most Gifted Music Video	AKA – Congratulate	Nominated	
2014	MTV Africa Music Awards	Best Music Video	Da L.E.S – Heaven	Nominated	
2016	Amsterdam Film Festival	Van Gogh Award: World Cinema Doc	Unwritten: A Visual Journey of Nepal	Won	
2016	Hollywood International Independent Documentary Awards	Best Cultural Short	Unwritten: A Visual Journey of Nepal	Won	
