= Filippo Baratti =

Italian Orientalist painter (1849–1936)

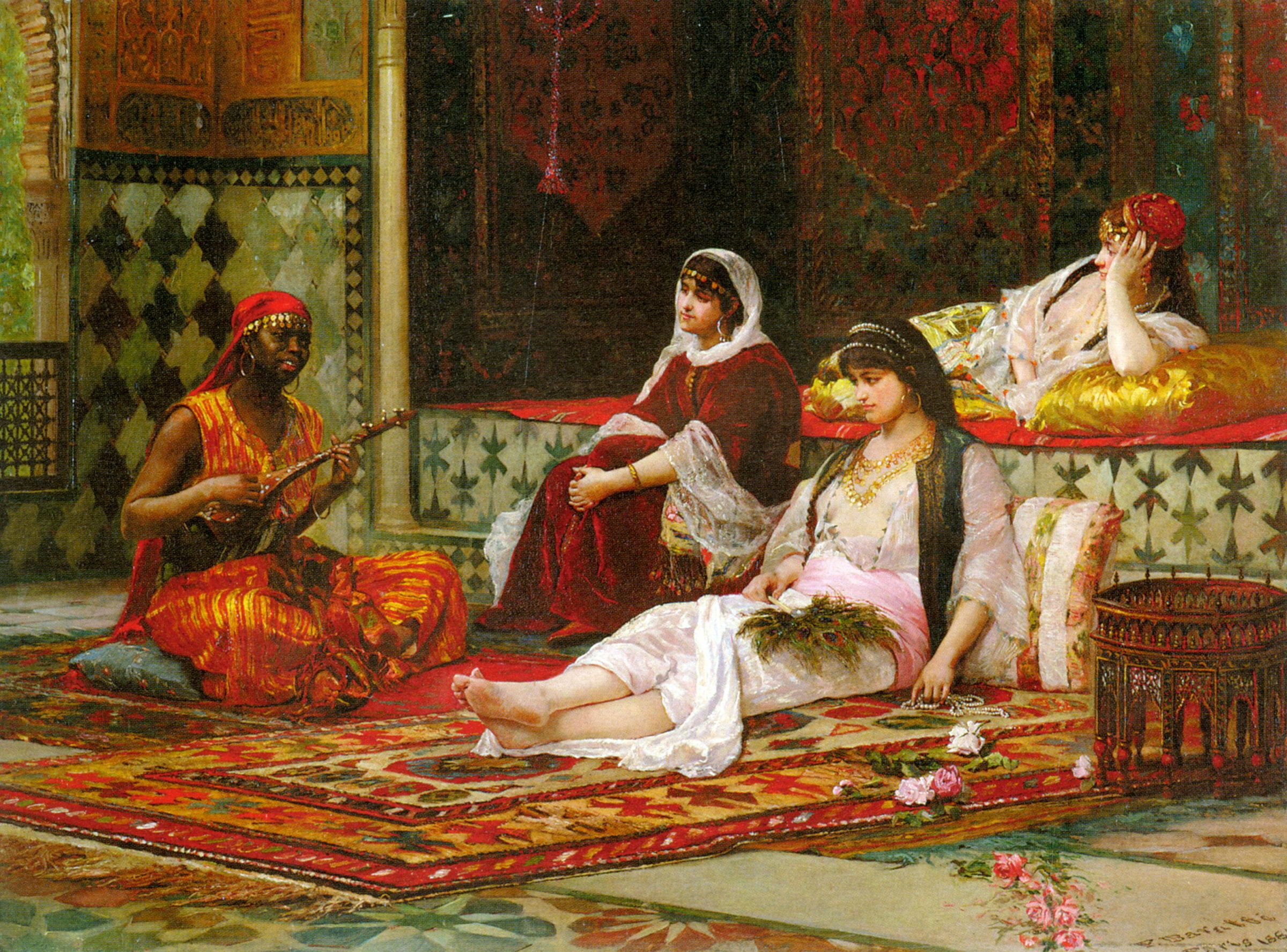
Entertaining the Harem Favorites

Filippo Baratti (1849, Trieste, Austrian Empire – 1936, Paris?) was an Italian painter; known primarily for his Orientalist scenes.

== Life and work ==
Where he studied, or who with, is unknown. In fact, very little is known of him prior to 1868, when he exhibited a painting at the "Esposizione di Belle Arte" in Milan. From 1869 to 1872, he had several showings at the "Societa Promatirice di Bella Arte" in Turin.

During this period, he focused on works with an Orientalist theme, and became one of the primary representatives of that style in Italy. His style was, itself, heavily influenced by Delacroix and Gérôme; whose works he had likely seen during an early visit to Paris.

Later, he lived in Paris (1870–1880) and London (1880–1885); where he began to concentrate more on cityscapes and landscapes. These are often judged superior to his earlier works, which were produced entirely through imagination and imitation. He returned to Paris and was there into the late 1900s, after which, again, very little is known.

== Selected works ==
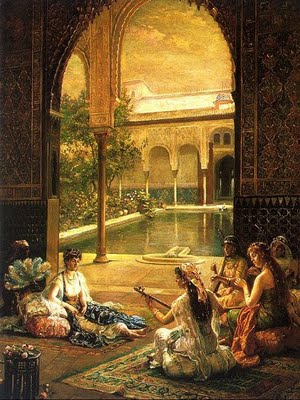
Isabel de Solis

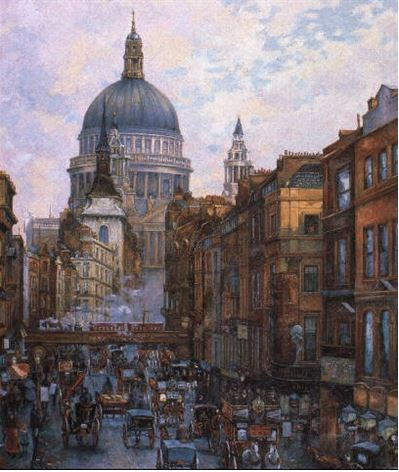
St Paul's Cathedral

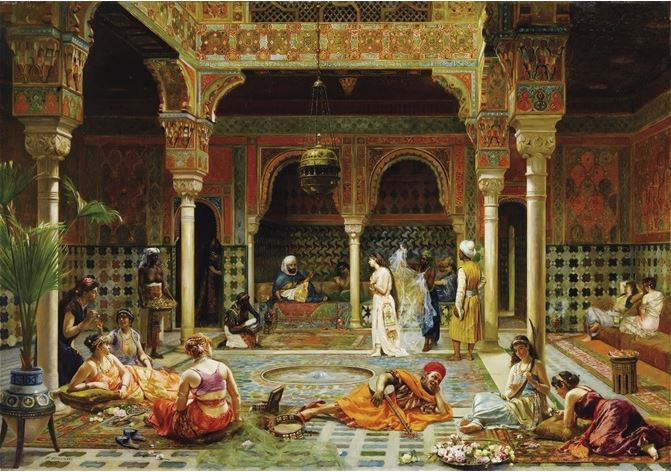
The new favourite

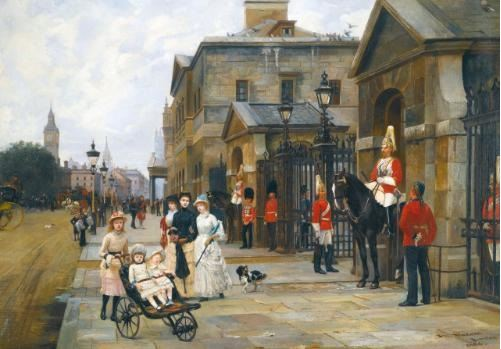
Horse guards
