= Shakir =

Shakir is both a surname and a given name originating from Arabic, similar to the surname or name Shakur. The feminine form of Shakir is Shakira. Notable people with the name include:

== Given name ==
- Shakir Ali (artist) (1875–1916), Pakistani artist and teacher
- Shakir Ali (barrister) (1879–1962), Indian lawyer and politician
- Samir Shakir Mahmoud (born 1944), a member of the Interim Iraq Governing Council
- Shakir Mukhamadullin (born 2002), Russian ice hockey player

== Surname ==
- Ahmad Muhammad Shakir (1892–1958), Egyptian scholar of Hadith (prophetic traditions)
- Habiburrahman Shakir (1903–1975), Tatar imam in Finland
- Faiz Shakir (born 1979), American Democratic political advisor and campaign manager for Bernie 2020
- Hannah Sabbagh Shakir (1895–1990), Lebanese-American businesswoman and club founder
- Khalil Shakir (born 2000), American football player
- M. H. Shakir (1866–1939), a translator of the Qur'an
- Mohammed Shakir (Iraqi politician) (born 1941/42), Iraqi politician
- Mohammed Shakir (Indian politician) (born 1948), Indian politician
- Zaid Shakir (born 1956), American Islamic scholar

== See also ==
- Shakur
