= Sarit Sivan =

Israeli biotechnology engineer

- שרית סיון
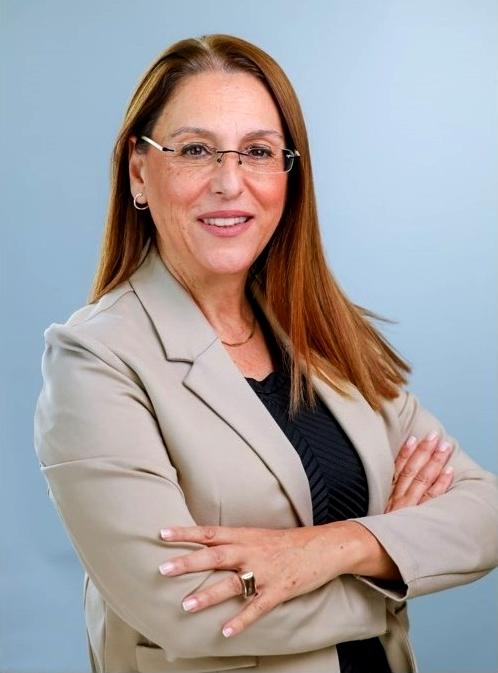
- Education: Technion – Israel Institute of Technology
- Known for: Research on biomaterials and connective tissues
- Scientific career
- Fields: Biotechnology engineering Biomaterials; Biophysics; Biomedical engineering
- Workplaces: Braude College of Engineering in Karmiel

Sarit Sivan (Hebrew: שרית סיון) is an Israeli professor of biotechnology engineering and the President of the Braude College of Engineering in Karmiel, Israel. Her research focuses on biomaterials for musculoskeletal and orthopedic applications, with an emphasis on structure–function relationships in connective tissues, and she is a recipient of the European Union's Marie Curie Award for Innovation and Entrepreneurship in Science.

== Biography ==
Sivan studied at the Appelman High School in Dimona and served in the Computer Unit of the Israeli Air Force. In 1992 she received a bachelor's degree in biology, in 1995 a master's degree in biomedical engineering, and in 2000 a Ph.D. in biomedical engineering, all from the Technion. Her doctoral research focused on hemoglobin derivatives as oxygen-carrying materials. Between 2003 and 2005 she completed a post-doctoral fellowship at the Technion, and between 2006 and 2008 she was awarded a Marie Curie Fellowship and conducted postdoctoral research at the Department of Physiology, Anatomy and Genetics at the University of Oxford.

During her postdoctoral research, Sivan developed biomaterials that mimic the natural tissue of the intervertebral disc as a potential treatment for disc degeneration and disc herniation. For this work, she and her colleagues received in 2009 the Spine Prize for Regenerative Technologies for the development of a biomaterial for intervertebral disc repair (Regenerative Technologies – Intervertebral Disc Biomaterial: Aston–Oxford–Keel).

In 2010, Sivan and her colleagues published a paper in the prestigious journal Langmuir on liposome-based lubricants for the treatment of arthritis, in collaboration with Prof. Yechezkel Barenholz of the Hebrew University of Jerusalem, Prof. Avi Schroeder, Prof. Yitzhak Aizenberg of the Technion, and others. The project to develop these materials led to the establishment of the startup company Moebius Medical; according to the company's official product information, its lead candidate (MM-II) is currently in Phase 3 clinical development for osteoarthritis of the knee.

In 2012, Sivan became the first Israeli woman to win the Marie Curie Award of the European Union in the category of Innovation and Entrepreneurship in Science, for her work developing biomaterials to treat connective tissue degeneration.

Upon her return to the Technion, Sivan received another Marie Curie Fellowship in the field of synovial joints lubricants.

In August 2013, Sivan joined the Department of Biotechnology Engineering at the Braude College of Engineering as a senior lecturer. Between 2013 and 2018 she headed the department, establishing its research laboratories and semi-industrial pilot laboratory. In November 2015 she was promoted to associate professor, in May 2018 appointed Vice President for Affairs, and in May 2024 appointed President of the college.

In 2025, Sivan was promoted to Full Professor.

== Research and publications ==
Sivan has authored more than 50 scientific papers in international journals on biomaterials, biochemistry and biophysics, as well as a book and chapters in other books.

She has received competitive research grants from the European Union (Marie Curie research grants), the Israel Science Foundation (ISF), an award from the American medical magazine Orthopedics Today, and has participated in several European Union consortia – FP5, FP6 and FP7 of the Framework Programmes for Research and Technological Development.

Her research focuses on the mechanisms of degeneration and aging of connective tissues (particularly the intervertebral disc and cartilage), with an emphasis on structure–function relationships, and on translating basic scientific knowledge into applied biomedical materials.

Together with Dr. Mirit Shariabi, she is developing a comprehensive structural and functional model of the intervertebral disc. She has also developed, with collaborators, a multifunctional platform integrating therapy, diagnostics and imaging for cancer treatment based on copper oxides, and another platform for aneurysm treatment using specialized hydrogels.

== Awards and research grants ==
- 2022–2026 – ISF Research Grant: Structural biomimetics of the intervertebral disc interfaces: lessons by reverse engineering.
- 2017–2021 – ISF Research Grant: Regeneration of the intervertebral disc annulus fibrosus using novel injectable biomimetic hydrogels.
- 2012 – Marie Curie Award for Innovation & Entrepreneurship in Science (European Union)
- 2011–2014 – Marie Curie Fellowship: synovial joint lubricants.
- 2009 – Orthopedy Today Award for Best Technology for Intervertebral Disc Repair.
- 2006–2008 – Marie Curie Fellowship, University of Oxford.
