= Shukriya (disambiguation) =

Shukriya is an Arabic female given name.

Shukriya may also refer to:

- Shukriya (TV series), a 2015 Indian reality TV show
- Shukriya: Till Death Do Us Apart, a 2004 Indian film
