= Sabrina Sabrok =

Argentine TV host, singer, adult actress, and producer

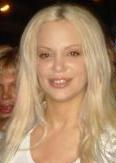
- Sabrok in March 2008
- Born: Lorena Fabiana Colotta; March 4, 1977 (age 48); Buenos Aires, Argentina
- Spouse: Alexandro Hernandez (m. 2016)
- Children: 2
- Modeling information
- Height: 176 cm (5 ft 9 in)
- Hair color: Blonde
- Eye color: Amber/Brown
- Website: sabrinasabrokvideos.com

Lorena Fabiana Colotta (born March 4, 1977), known professionally as Sabrina Sabrok, is an Argentine television host, cyberpunk rock singer, adult model, pornographic actress, and producer.

== Discography ==
- Deal with the devil (2016)
- Dangerous love (2016)
- Antisocial EP (2009)
- Jugando Con Sangre (2008)
- Sabrina EP (2006)
- Sodomizado Estas (2002)
- Primeras Impresiones IV (2001)
- Primeras Impresiones III (1999)
- Primeras Impresiones II (1998)
- Primeras Impresiones (1997)

== Television appearances ==
Sabrok has appeared in several television shows such as La hora pico (as a model), and the Mexican edition of the reality show Big Brother VIP. She hosted her own television show on TeleHit, called Sabrina, El Sexo en su Máxima Expresión or more commonly known simply as Sabrina. In 2015, Sabrok took part in the TV segment 'Te lo hundo y te mojas', alongside Andrea Rincon.

== Personal life ==
Since 2016, Sabrok has been married to Alexandro Hernandez, a musician fifteen years her junior. Sabrok has two daughters, Dulcinea, from a previous relationship with Roberto Dubaz, and Metztli (who is deaf and is autistic), from her relationship with to Erick Farjeat. Both children live with their fathers. In 2020, she alleged that professional wrestler Cibernético was the biological father of her daughter, and not Farjeat.
