= Sarai, Russia =

Set index of articles associated with the same name

Sarai (Russian: Сараи) is the name of several inhabited localities in Russia.

Urban localities

- Sarai, Ryazan Oblast, a work settlement in Sarayevsky District of Ryazan Oblast

Rural localities

- Sarai, Altai Krai, a selo in Stukovsky Selsoviet of Pavlovsky District of Altai Krai
- Sarai, Rostov Oblast, a khutor in Azhinovskoye Rural Settlement of Bagayevsky District of Rostov Oblast
