= Shubh Sukh Chain =

National anthem of the Provisional Government of Free India

Śubh Sukh Cain
English: Auspicious Happiness
- National anthem of the Provisional Government of Free India
- Lyrics: Capt. Abid Ali, Mumtaz Hussain, 1943
- Music: Capt. Ram Singh Thakuri
- Adopted: 1943
- Relinquished: 18 August 1945

Shubh Sukh Chain (Hindustani: शुभ सुख चैन, سب سکھ چین), also romanised as Śubh Sukh Cain (Hindi: [ʃʊbʱ sʊkʰ tʃɛːn]; lit. 'Auspicious Happiness'), was the national anthem of the Provisional Government of Free India also known as Azad Hind.

The song was based on a Bengali poem Bharoto Bhagyo Bidhata by Rabindranath Tagore. When Subhas Chandra Bose shifted to Southeast Asia from Germany in 1943, he, with the help of Mumtaz Hussain, a writer with the Azad Hind Radio, and Colonel Abid Hasan Safrani of the Indian National Army (INA), rewrote Tagore’s Jana Gana Mana into the Hindustani Shubh Sukh Chain for use as the national anthem. Bose then went to what was then the INA broadcasting station at the Cathay Building in Singapore and asked Capt. Ram Singh Thakuri to compose the music for a song translated from Rabindranath Tagore's original Bengali score. He asked him to give the song a martial tune.

India attained independence on 15 August 1947, and the next morning Jawaharlal Nehru unfurled the tricolour on the ramparts of the Red Fort and addressed the nation. It was on this occasion that Captain Thakuri was invited to play the tune of Shubh Sukh Chain along with the members of his orchestra group.

== History ==
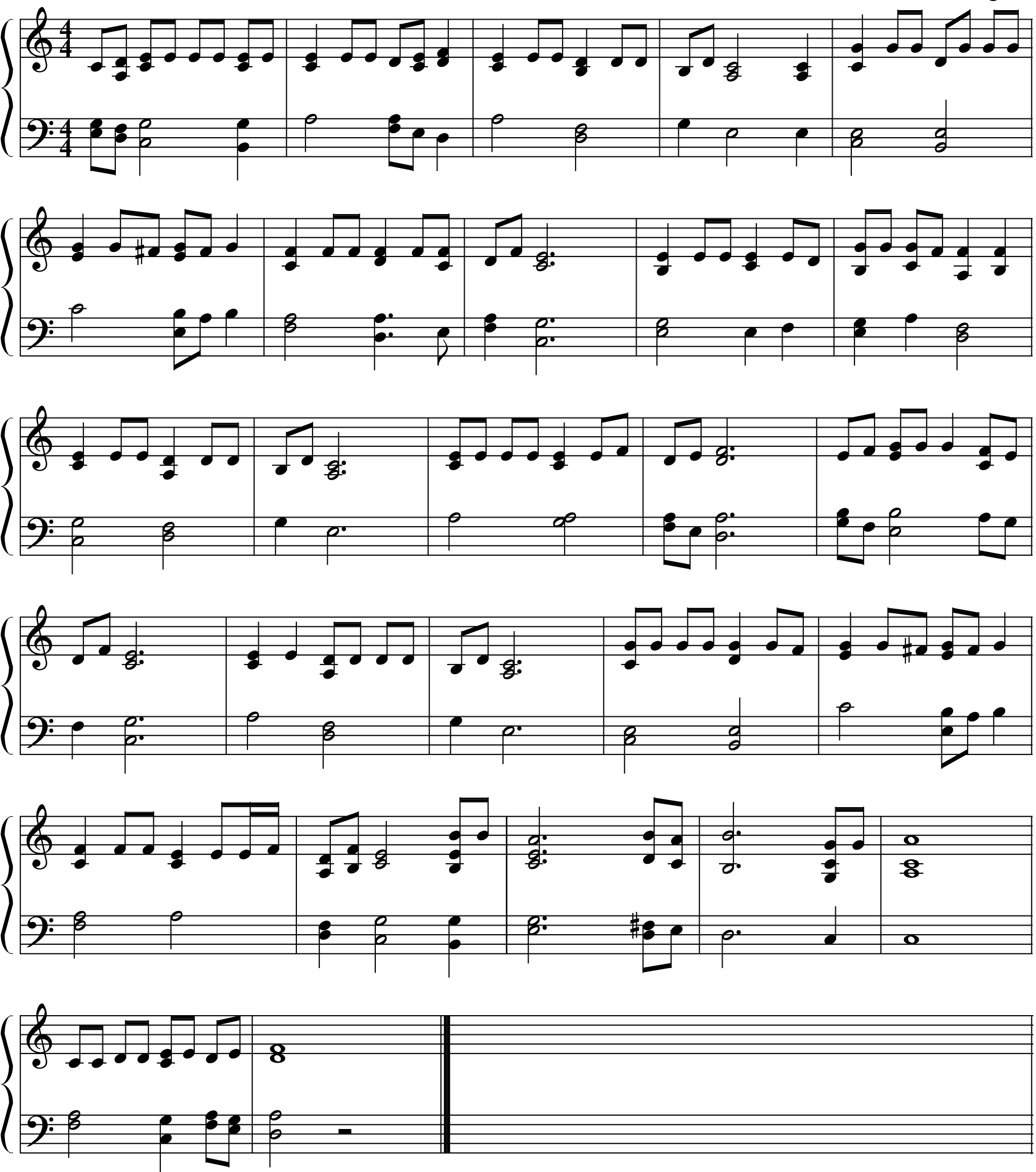
The score for the first stanza of the anthem. This is also shared by the current national anthem of India.

During the Indian independence movement, the song Vande Mataram was frequently sung at protest meetings, including at the proclamation of the Provisional Government of Free India in Singapore in October 1943. Some Muslims were, however, not comfortable with the expressly Hindu metaphors used in the song, and disliked the book, Anandamath, in which it had been first published. The leaders of the Indian National Army in Singapore were aware of this problem, and hoped that Subhas Chandra Bose, the head of the INA and the Azad Hind, would settle it. Lakshmi Sahgal, who was an INA member, favoured the selection of Jana Gana Mana, which was composed by Rabindranath Tagore and had been sung at sessions of the Indian National Congress. She arranged to have it sung at a women's meeting attended by Bose. Bose was taken by the song, which he thought was nationally representative. However, he did not like that the song was in Sanskritized Bengali, and commissioned a free translation to Hindustani.

The translation, Shubh Sukh Chain, was written by Captain Abid Hasan Safrani, and its score composed by Captain Ram Singh Thakuri. It took Vande Mataram's place as the official national anthem of the Provisional Government, and was sung at all meetings, including at the final assembly before Bose's departure.

On 24 January 1950, President-elect Rajendra Prasad announced the final decision that Jana Gana Mana would be the national anthem of the independent Republic of India.

== Lyrics ==
Unlike Jana Gana Mana, the lyrics of Shubh Sukh Chain is written in the Hindustani language. The core theme of the anthem's lyrics is that of the whole of India joining together to hope for peace and unity in the nation.

| Devanagari script | Nastaliq script | | English translation |
|---|---|---|---|
| शुभ सुख चैन की बरखा बरसे, भारत भाग है जागा पंजाब, सिन्ध, गुजरात, मराठा, द्राविड़ उत्कल बंगा चंचल सागर, विन्ध्य, हिमालय, नीला यमुना गंगा तेरे नित गुण गाएँ, तुझसे जीवन पाएँ सब तन पाए आशा। सूरज बन कर जग पर चमके, भारत नाम सुहागा, जय हो! जय हो! जय हो! जय जय जय जय हो! भारत नाम सुहागा॥ सब के दिल में प्रीत बसाए तेरी मीठी वाणी, हर सूबे के रहनेवाले, हर मज़हब के प्राणी, सब भेद और फरक मिटा के, सब गोद में तेरी आके, गूँथे प्रेम की माला सूरज बनकर जग पर चमके, भारत नाम सुहागा, जय हो! जय हो! जय हो! जय जय जय जय हो! भारत नाम सुहागा॥ शुभ सवेरे पंख पखेरे, तेरे ही गुण गाएँ, बास भरी भरपूर हवाएँ, जीवन में रुत लाएँ, सब मिल कर हिन्द पुकारे, जय आज़ाद हिन्द के नारे, प्यारा देश हमारा सूरज बन कर जग पर चमके, भारत नाम सुहागा, जय हो! जय हो! जय हो! जय जय जय जय हो! भारत नाम सुहागा॥ | شبھ سکھ چین کی برکھا برسے، بھارت بھاگ ہے جگ۔ پنجاب، سندھ، گجرات، مراٹہ، دراویڈ، اتکل، بنگا، چنچل ساگر، وندھی، ہمالی، نیلا جمنا، گنگا۔ تیرے نِت گُن گئے، تجھے جیون پائے، سب تن پائے آشا۔ سورج بن کر جگ پر چمکے، بھارت نام سہاگہ، جے ہو! جے ہو! جے ہو! جے، جے، جے، جے ہو! بھارت نام سہاگہ! سب کے دل میں پریت بسے تیری میٹھی وانی، ہر سوبے کے رہنوالے، ہر مذاق کے پرانے، سب بھید اور فراق میتا کے سب خدا میں تیری آکھے، گنٹے پریم کی ملا۔ سورج بن کر جگ پر چمکے، بھارت نام سہاگہ، جے ہو! جے ہو! جے ہو! جے، جے، جے، جے ہو بھارت نام سہاگہ! شبھا سیورے پنکھ پکھیرے، تیرے ہی گنیں گے، بھاس بھری بھرپور ہوائیں، جیون میں رت لے، سب مل کر ہند پُکارے، جے آزادی ہند کے نارے، پیارا دیش ہمارا۔ سورج بن کر جگ پر چمکے، بھارت نام سہاگہ، جے ہو! جے ہو! جے ہو! جے، جے، جے، جے ہو! بھارت نام سہاگہ! | Shubh sukh chain ki barkha barse, Bhārat bhāg hai jāg. Panjāb, Sindh, Gujarāt, Marāṭha, Drāviḍ, Utkal, Banga, Chanchchal sāgar, Vindhy, Himālay, nīla Yamuna, Ganga. Tere nit guṇ gaeñ, tujhse jīvan paeñ, sab tan paeñ āsha. Sūraj ban kar jag par chamke, Bhārat nām suhāga, Jay ho! Jay ho! Jay ho! Jay, jay, jay, jay ho! Bharat naam suhāgā! Sab ke dil meñ prīt basae teri mīṭhi vāṇi, Har sūbe ke rahnevāle, har mazhab ke prāṇi, Sab bhed aur farak mita ke Sab godh men teri ākhe, gūnthe prem ki māla. Sūraj ban kar jag par chamke, Bhārat nām suhāga, Jay ho! Jay ho! Jay ho! Jay, jay, jay, jay ho Bharat naam suhāgā! Shubha savere pankh pakhere, tere hi guṇ gaeñ, Bhās bhari bharpūr havaeñ, jīvan meñ rut laeñ, Sab mil kar Hind pukāre, Jay Āzād Hind ke nāre, pyāra desh hamāra. Sūraj ban kar jag par chamke, Bhārat nām suhāga, Jay ho! Jay ho! Jay ho! Jay, jay, jay, jay ho! Bharat naam suhāgā! | May it rain peace, happiness and tranquility India's Destiny has awakened! All of Punjab, Sindh, Gujarat, Maratha, Dravida, Utkal, Bengal, From The wavy seas, the Vindhya and the Himalayas, to the blue Yamuna and Ganges, They all sing your praises, get their lives from you, every body gains hope! May the auspicious name of India shine on the world like the sun. Victory to Thee! Victory to Thee! Victory to Thee!, Victory Victory Victory Victory To Thee! The auspicious name of India. Your sweet voice keeps love in everyone's heart, May the residents of every province, the creatures of every religion, By erasing all differences between them, All come together into your lap, and weave together a garland of love. May the auspicious name of India shine on the world like the sun Victory to Thee! Victory to Thee! Victory to Thee!, Victory Victory Victory Victory To Thee! The auspicious name of India. On the mornings, with wings fluttering, we sing your praises, The fragrant and full winds bring seasons into our lives, All together, India cries out, Slogans of "Victory to Free India" O! Our lovely country. May the auspicious name of India shine on the world like the sun. Victory to Thee! Victory to Thee! Victory to Thee!, Victory Victory Victory Victory To Thee! The auspicious name of India. |

== See also ==
- Jana Gana Mana, the National Anthem of India
- Vande Mataram, the National Song of India
- Amar Shonar Bangla, the National Anthem of Bangladesh
- Qadam Qadam Badhaye Ja, the March of Indian National Army
- Abid Hasan
- Capt. Ram Singh Thakuri
