= Shakur =

Shakur is a surname that is also occasionally used as a given name, in a similar vein to Shakir. Additionally, it derives from one of the names of God in Islam, Ash-Shakur. Notable people with the name include:

== Surname ==
- 'Abd Allah II ibn 'Ali 'Abd ash-Shakur (died 1930), Ethiopian emir
- Afeni Shakur (1947–2016), American political activist
- Assata Shakur (1947–2025), American political activist
- Mopreme Shakur (born 1969), American rapper
- Muhammad ibn 'Ali 'Abd ash-Shakur (died 1875), Ethiopian emir
- Mustafa Shakur (born 1984), American basketball player
- Mutulu Shakur (1950–2023), Black Liberation Army leader
- Sanyika Shakur (1963–2021), Los Angeles gang member
- Tupac Shakur (1971–1996), American rapper and actor

== Given name ==
- Shakur Brown (born 1999), American football player
- Shakur Stevenson (born 1997), American professional boxer

== See also ==
- Ayize Jama-Everett (a Shakur descendant)
