= Shakir Ali (barrister) =

Indian lawyer and politician

Shakir Ali (7 June 1879 – 26 December 1962) was an Indian lawyer and politician.

Ali was born in a small town about twenty miles from Lucknow, the capital of Northwestern Provinces, during India's period under British rule. His ancestors acted as Quazi during the Mughal regime. He completed his early education at MAO Aligarh (now Aligarh Muslim University). He went to England in 1905 to join Lincoln's Inn in order to obtain a degree in law. In 1908 he graduated and came back to India. He was appointed inspector of Schools, but after some time he decided to resign the post and began practicing as a barrister in Gorakhpur. He became one of India's most notable criminal lawyers, appearing in such important cases as the Meerut Conspiracy Case, the INA trials (held in Delhi's Red Fort), the Kakori train dacoity and the Chauri Chaura arson case.

During the Quit India Movement, he joined the Congress and very soon became a force to reckon with in the party. He served on the executive committee of the Congress and was very popular in whole of the eastern region of India. He was a member of the reformed Legislative Council from 1921 to 1923. He was a staunch nationalist throughout his life. and led the Khilafat movement in Gorakhpur in 1920.

He retired in 1956 after practicing criminal law for 45 years. He died at the age of 84 on 26 December 1962.
