= Braude College of Engineering =

University in Karmiel, Israel

Coordinates: 32°54′51.76″N 35°16′57.33″E

Braude Academic College of Engineering
- המִכְלָלָה האָקָדֶמִית להַנְדָּסָה בראודה
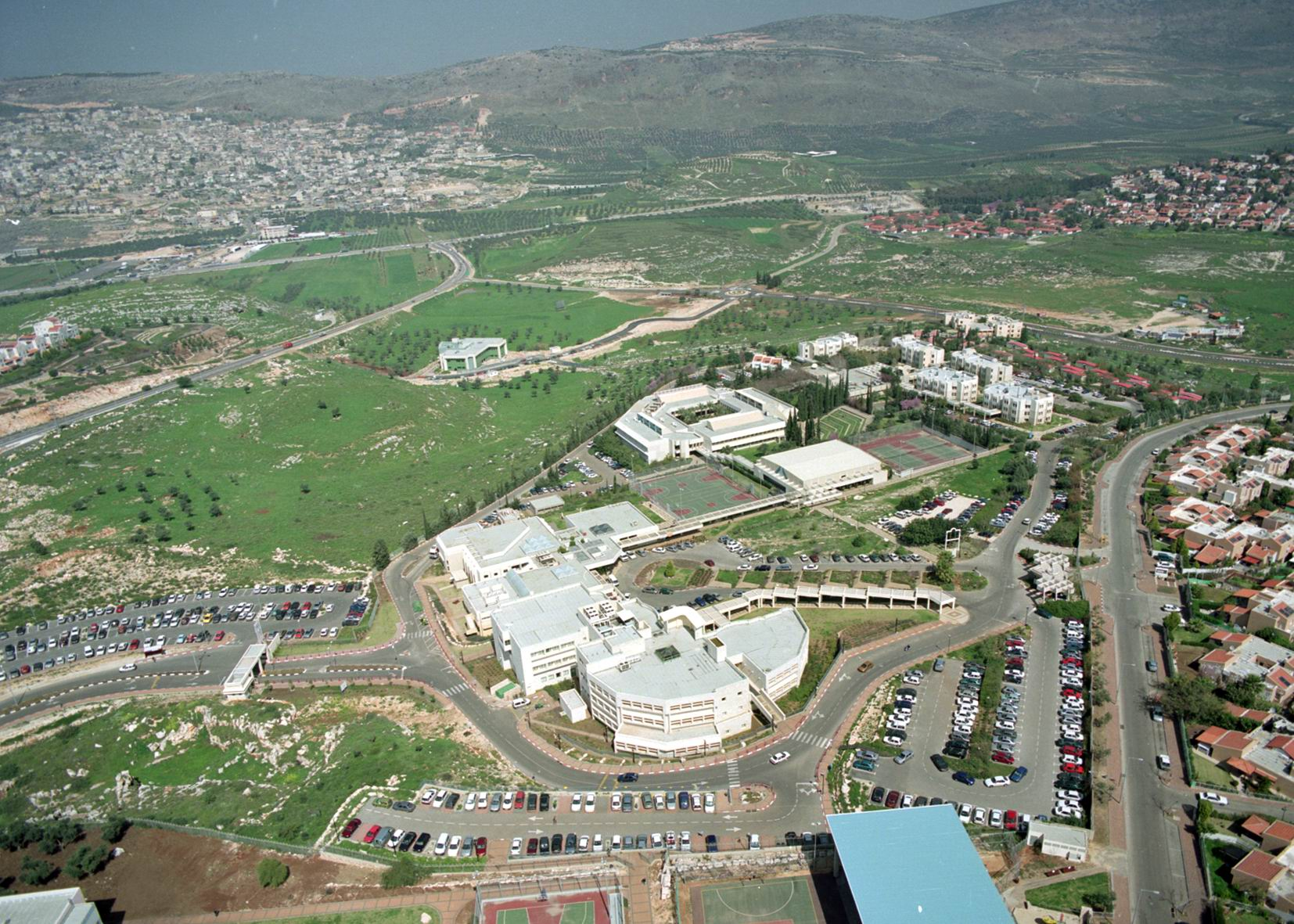
- Aerial view, Braude College (2006)
- Students: 3,400
- Location: Karmiel, Israel

Braude Academic College of Engineering (Hebrew: המִכְלָלָה האָקָדֶמִית להַנְדָּסָה בראודה, romanized: ha-mikhlala ha-akademit le-handasa Braude) is a college in the city of Karmiel, Israel.

== History ==
Braude college was established in Karmiel in 1985 by ORT Israel and World ORT organizations. In 1992 an academic college, financed by the government, started operating on the campus grounds. The college also offers student exchange programs through partnerships with universities abroad.

== See also ==
- List of universities and colleges in Israel
- Education in Israel
