= Shakila (disambiguation) =

Shakila (born 1962) is a Persian-American singer-songwriter.

Shakila may also refer to:

- Shakila (actress) (1935–2017), Indian film actress
- Shakila Jalaluddin, Indian politician

== See also ==
- Shakira (disambiguation)
- Shakeela, Indian actress
  - Shakeela (film), 2020 Indian biographical film by Indrajit Lankesh based on her life
- Shakeela Bano Bhopali, Indian actress and singer
