= Sarah (ship) =

Several ships have been named Sarah:

- Sarah (1788 ship) was a brig of 154 tons (bm) launched in 1788. She sailed to Great Britain and from 1789 was a slave ship in the triangular trade in enslaved people. She made two full enslaving voyages from Bristol. She was lost on her third voyage after having delivered her captives to Jamaica.
- Sarah (1792 ship) was launched at Bombay. In 1801 she participated as a transport in the British expedition to the Red Sea. Her captain deliberately ran her ashore in 1805 to prevent the French from capturing her.
- Sarah (1797 ship) was launched at Liverpool. She then made six voyages carrying slaves from West Africa to the West Indies. A French privateer captured Sarah in 1803 on her seventh voyage.
- Sarah (1798 ship) was launched in Spain in 1791, presumably under another name. The British captured her c.1798. She made five voyages as a slave ship before a Spanish privateer captured her in 1805. On her fourth voyage Sarah had captured two French slave ships at Loanga.
- Sarah (1800 ship) was launched at Hartlepool. Between 1807 and 1813 Sarah made two voyages as a whaler in the British southern whale fishery. As she was coming home from her first whaling voyage a French privateer captured her, but a British privateer recaptured her. After her whaling voyages Sarah became a transport, a West Indiaman, and traded with North America. She was last listed in 1826.
- Sarah (1803 ship) was launched at Liverpool. She made a short voyage as a privateer during which she captured a valuable prize. She then made two voyages as a slave ship. A French naval squadron captured her early in her third slaving voyage.
- Sarah (1810 ship) was launched at Bristol as a West Indiaman. From 1818 she sailed as an East Indiaman until she wrecked at the Cape of Good Hope in 1822.
- Sarah (1819 ship) was launched at Rotherhithe. She made three trips to China and went to Australia four times. In 1829 she transported convicts to New South Wales and in 1837 she delivered convicts to Van Diemen's Land. She was condemned c.1842.
- Sarah (1986 ship) was launched at Hamble. She was rebuilt in 2023 to rescue migrants in the Mediterranean Sea.
