= Sarju (disambiguation) =

Sarju, or Sarayu, is a river in Uttarakhand, India.

Sarju, Saryu or Sarayu may also refer to:

== Geography ==
- Sarayu (Rigvedic river), a river mentioned in the Rigveda, variously identified with the Sarju and other rivers
- Sarayu River (Ayodhya), the Ghaghara river as it is known around the Ayodhya region in Uttar Pradesh, India, also transcribed as Saryu and Sarju
- Sarju railway station, railway station in Uttar Pradesh, India
- Sarju Sagar Dam, dam in Jhunjhunu, Rajasthan, India

== People ==
- Saryu Doshi, Indian art historian
- Sarayu Mohan, Indian actress
- Sarayu Rao, Indian-American actress also known as Sarayu R. Blue
- Saryu Roy (politician), Indian politician
- Saryoo Singh, Indian politician
- Sarju Bala Devi, Indian boxer
- Sarju Prasad Saroj, Indian politician
- Sarju Prasad Misra, Indian politician
- Saraju Bala Devi, Indian actress and singer
- Saraju Bala Sen, Indian writer and educator
- Saraju Mohanty, Indian-American computer scientist
- Dilip Sardjoe (alternative transliteration of Sarju), Indo-Surinamese politician
- Ram Sardjoe, Indo-Surinamese politician, Vice President of Suriname from 2005 to 2010

== Others ==
- INS Sarayu (P54), a Sukanya-class patrol vessel
- Saryu-class patrol vessel, class of Indian Navy ships
  - INS Saryu (P54), the lead ship of the follow-on class of patrol ships
- Saryu Express, passenger train of the Indian Railways, running to and from Ayodhya which is settled on the Sarayu River in Uttar Pradesh
- Saryu Yamuna Express, passenger train of the Indian Railways, running between Ayodhya and Delhi, the latter settled on the Yamuna River
- Saryu Pareen Brahmin, a Brahmin community originating from the Sarayu River in Ayodhya, India
