= Sarai Kale Khan (disambiguation) =

Sarai Kale Khan, officially known as Birsa Munda Chowk, is a village in Delhi, India.

The term may also refer to:

- Sarai Kale Khan Inter-State Bus Terminus, a bus terminal complex in Delhi
- Sarai Kale Khan Nizamuddin metro station, a metro station in Delhi
- Sarai Kale Khan RRTS station, an upcoming RapidX's Delhi–Meerut RRTS station
