= Sariya Mirzhanova =

Soviet Bashkiria and Russian linguist, Turkologist (1924–2000)

Sariya Fazullovna Mirzhanova (Russian: Сария Фазулловна Миржанова, Bashkir: Şəriә Fazyl ҡыҙы Әmirљінова; 24 December 1924 – 25 November 2000) was a Soviet Bashkiria and Russian linguist, and Turkologist. She was awarded the title, Honored Culture Worker of the Bashkir ASSR (1985). Her name is also spelled as Saria Fazulova Mirzhanova.

== Early life and education ==
Sariya Fazullovna Mirzhanova was born on 24 December 1924, in the village of Kashkarovo, Bashkir Autonomous Soviet Socialist Republic.

She graduated in 1948 from the Magnitogorsk Pedagogical Institute (now Magnitogorsk State University); and from the Bashkir State Pedagogical Institute named after K.A. Timiryazev in 1956. She was a Doctor of Philological Sciences (1985).

== Career ==
Mirzhanova began teaching Russian language and literature at the Askarovsky Secondary School. From 1948 until 1955, she was a teacher of Russian language and literature in Sibayevsk and Khabrovsk. Beginning in 1955, she was a senior laboratory assistant at the Institute of History of Language and Literature of the Bashkir Branch of the Academy of Sciences of the Soviet Union, where she worked until the 1990s.

In 1979, she wrote the monograph "The Southern Dialect of the Bashkir Language", which formed the basis of her doctoral dissertation, which was defended in 1984. She wrote the monograph "The Northwestern Dialect of the Bashkir Language" in 1991.

She is recognized as an expert in the field of Turkic and Bashkir dialectology and lexicography. He has over 40 published scientific articles. She participated in the compilation of the "Dictionary of Bashkir Dialects" in 3 volumes, Bashkir-Russian, Russian-Bashkir and other dictionaries. As a dialectologist, he studies the interaction of languages at the level of the national spoken language, the literary language and dialects.

Mirzhanova died after a long illness on 25 November 2000, in Ufa, Russia. She was buried at the Timashevsky Cemetery in Ufa.

She is the namesake of a street in the village of Askarovo, Bashkortostan.

== Works ==
- Mirzhanova, Sariya Fazullovna (1979). Yuzhnyy dialekt bashkirskogo yazyka [Southern Bashkir Dialect in Russian] (in Russian). Moscow.
