= Saray Azadi =

Town square in Sulayamania, Iraq

- Square
- Bar Darki Sara, Maidani Azadi
- سەرای ئازادی
- Location: Sulaymania, Iraq
- Interactive map of Saray Azadi
- Coordinates: 35.557°N 45.443°E
- The square was occupied by anti-KRG protestors between 17 February and 18 April 2011.

Saray Azadi (Freedom Square) (Kurdish: سەرای ئازادی) is a square in the old town centre in the Iraqi Kurdish city of Sulaymania. The square has otherwise been known as Bar Darki Sara (Sara Gate Square) and more recently Maidani Azadi (Kurdish: مەیدانی ئازادی). Some Kurdish media outlets have combined the old and the new name, calling it Saray Azadi. All three names are still in usage, but Saray Azadi has been more frequently used.

The square was occupied by anti-KRG protestors between 17 February and 18 April 2011.
