= Sarai, Iran =

Sarai سرائي
- Village
- Location within Iran
- Coordinates: 34°42′18″N 45°49′17″E
- Country: Iran
- Province: Kermanshah
- County: Salas-e Babajani
- Bakhsh: Ozgoleh
- Rural District: Jeygaran

Population (2006)
  - Total: 128
- Time zone: UTC+3:30 (IRST)
  - Summer (DST): UTC+4:30 (IRDT)

Sarai (Persian: سرائي, also Romanized as Sarā’ī) is a village in Jeygaran Rural District, Ozgoleh District, Salas-e Babajani County, Kermanshah Province, Iran. At the 2006 census, its population was 128, in 24 families.
