= Sarajubala Sen =

Bengali writer

- Born: 1889
- Died: 1949 (aged 59–60)
- Occupation: Writer

Sarajubala Sen (Bengali: লেখক:সরযূবালা সেন) (1889–1949) was a Bengali writer and educator.

== Biography ==
Sen was born in 1889, her father was Brajendra Nath Seal, the humanist philosopher, writer and poet. She grew up with three sisters and three brothers. Sen studied kindergarten education in England and returned home in 1915. Her nickname was Tuli. Sen married twice. Her first husband was Basantrajan Das, whose brother Chittaranjan Das was a poet. After Basantrajan's death, Sen married again, this time to Das' widowed brother-in-law Saratchandra Sen. He was a staunch nationalist.

== Writing ==
Whilst Sen was in England, the country was undergoing political unrest prior to the First World War and this experience had an effect on her writing. Her first work The Passing Away of Spring was a self-reflective symbolic work and the introduction to it was written by Rabrindranath Tagore.

Debottar Vishwanatya (The Superdivine Play of the Universe) was written in 1916 and is a metaphysical drama depicting the struggle of peasant workers. What is striking about this play is the feminist dimensions of it: the heroine rejects marriage and features comments about the struggle working women have over child-care. She features in The Complete History of Bengali Literature (1960). Critic Sukumar Sen states that the philosophical influence of her father is present in all her work.

== Works ==
- The Passing Away of Spring - বসন্তপ্রয়াণ (1914)
- Triveni Sangam - ত্রিবেণী সঙ্গম (1915)
- Debottar Vishwanatya- দেবোত্তর বিশ্বনাট্য (1916)
- Annapurna - অন্নপূর্ণা
- Viswanath - বিশ্বনাথ

== Activism ==
Sen was also a political activist, along with many other Bengali women in the first half of the twentieth century. Hers and her husband's home was a political one, and was often raided by the police. Sarajubala was also actively involved in the nationalist cause on at least one occasion, singing a song by Tagore at a public meeting attended by Bipin Chandra Pal.
