= Sarah-e Shadadi =

Sarah-e Shadadi سراح شهدادي
- Village
- Country: Iran
- Province: Hormozgan
- County: Hajjiabad
- Bakhsh: Central
- Rural District: Tarom

Population (2006)
  - Total: 718
- Time zone: UTC+3:30 (IRST)
  - Summer (DST): UTC+4:30 (IRDT)

Sarah-e Shadadi (Persian: سراح شهدادي, also Romanized as Sarāḥ-e Shahdādī) is a village in Tarom Rural District, in the Central District of Hajjiabad County, Hormozgan Province, Iran. At the 2006 census, its population was 718, in 153 families.
