= Sehra =

Sehra may refer to:

- Sehra (headdress), a headdress worn by the groom during Pakistani, Indian and Bangladeshi weddings
- Sehra (poetry), a poem or prothalamion sung at a nikah (Muslim wedding) in praise of the groom, praying to God for his future wedded life
- Sehra (film), a 1963 Indian Hindi-language romantic family drama film
- "Sehra", a song by Sachin–Jigar, Dhvani Bhanushali and Varun Jain from the 2024 Indian film Kahan Shuru Kahan Khatam

== See also ==
- Sarah (disambiguation)
