= Soraya Córdova =

Mexican politician

- Born: 29 June 1959 (age 66); Puebla, Mexico
- Occupation: Deputy
- Political party: PRI

Frine Soraya Córdova Morán (born 29 June 1959) is a Mexican politician affiliated with the PRI. As of 2013 she served as Deputy of the LXII Legislature of the Mexican Congress representing Puebla.
