= Sarai Shishgaran =

- town
- Location in Uttar Pradesh, India Sarai Shishgaran (India)
- Coordinates: 26°48′43″N 79°21′02″E
- Country: India
- State: Uttar Pradesh
- District: Auraiya

Languages
  - Official: Hindi
- Time zone: UTC+5:30 (IST)
- Vehicle registration: UP-
- Coastline: 0 kilometres (0 mi)

Sarai Shishgaran is a town in Auraiya district in the state of Uttar Pradesh, India.
