= Shukri Toefy =

Entrepreneur, investor, film producer, speaker and co-founder and CEO at Fort

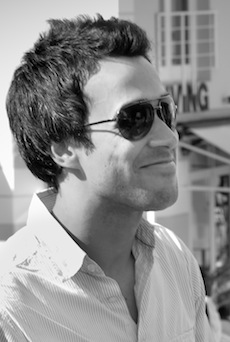
- Born: 1 April 1984 (age 41); Cape Town, South Africa
- Occupations: Entrepreneur, investor, film producer, public speaker, CEO
- Years active: 2006–present
- Website: shukritoefy.com

Shukri Toefy is an entrepreneur, investor, film producer, speaker and co-founder and CEO at Fort. He is currently based in Johannesburg, South Africa.

== Career ==
Shukri Toefy holds a degree in Law and Politics from the University of Cape Town, an Executive MBA from the University of Cape Town Graduate School of Business, and is an Entrepreneurship Expert at Saïd Business School, University of Oxford.

He has served on a number of boards, including The Cape Film Commission, Sizalo Investment Group and Kinza.org, and has presented on topics including entrepreneurship, business model innovation, storytelling, shared value, and policy on economic and social development.

== Fort ==
While a student at the University of Cape Town, Shukri Toefy met Amr Singh. The two became friends and, after choosing to miss their graduation ceremony to take a job filming in Dublin, Ireland, went on to found Fort (formerly West Fort, then The Fort, before a final name change in 2017) together, where he now serves as co-founder and chief executive officer.

== The Rainmakers Journal ==
Shukri Toefy is the founder and narrator of the Rainmakers Journal, a thought leadership platform that, through a series of projects, hopes to help people unlock the value of shared knowledge. Current projects include Unwritten: A Visual Journey of Nepal, an award-winning arthouse short film, and a series of workshops designed around the importance of journaling as a method of unlocking hidden treasures, setting goals and the value of shared knowledge.

== Unwritten: A Visual Journey of Nepal ==
In 2014, filming began on Unwritten: A Visual Journey of Nepal, an arthouse short film shot in the Kathmandu Valley, Nepal only months before the Ghorka earthquakes. A film project started with Fort co-founder Amr Singh, under the Rainmakers Journal thought leadership platform, is a powerful cinematic account of Toefy's journey across the Kathmandu Valley as told by the pages of his journal. Along his journey he meets with artisans, musicians, spiritualists, scholars, and survivors of a bygone era where the knowledge handed down from generation to generation was seen as a rite of passage, in search of lessons he can apply to his own life.

The short has since caught the attention of various international film festivals, including the Amsterdam Film Festival, where it won the Van Gogh award for best World Cinema: Documentary Feature, the Hollywood International Independent Documentary Awards (HIIDA) where it won Best Cultural Short, as well as official selections at Rome Film Festival, Balinale and Largo Film Festival.

== Filmography ==
=== Film ===
- 2016: Unwritten: A Visual Journey of Nepal

=== Commercials ===
- Lays – Endless Questions (2010)
- The Haven Night Shelter – Lets Get the Homeless Home (2010)
- Women's Health South Africa – Good To Be You (2009)
- Remia – Over the Fence (2009)
- SuperSport – Globacom Premier League (2008)

=== Television ===
- Hamba Dompas Woza ID (2010) (producer)
- Sudafrica 2010 (2010) (producer)

=== Music videos ===
- "First We Need the Love" – Zain Bhikha (2010)
- "Who I Am" – Zain Bhikha (2009)
- "What's Love" – HC (2008)

== Awards and nominations ==
List of awards and nominations
Year	Award / Film Festival	Category	Work	Result
2016	Amsterdam Film Festival	Van Gogh Award: World Cinema Doc	Unwritten: A Visual Journey of Nepal	Won
2016	Hollywood International Independent Documentary Awards	Best Cultural Short	Unwritten: A Visual Journey of Nepal	Won

== Other recognition ==
- 2008, Cape Film Commission – Board of Directors
