= Ram Singh Thakuri =

Indian freedom fighter

Captain Ram Singh Thakuri
- Born: 15 August 1914; Khanyara, Dharamsala, Punjab Province, British India (now in Himachal Pradesh, India)
- Died: 15 April 2002 (aged 87); Bhaisakund, Uttar Pradesh, India
- Spouse: Premu Thakuri
- Military career
- Allegiance: British India; Azad Hind; India
- Branch: British Indian Army (Azad Hind) Indian National Army; Indian Army
- Service years: 1942–1974
- Rank: Company Havildar Major
- Unit: 1st Gorkha Rifles
- Conflicts: Khyber-Pakhtunkhwa War
- Awards: King George VI Coronation Medal
- Other work: Band Master

Ram Singh Thakuri (15 August 1914 – 15 April 2002) was an Indian freedom fighter, musician and composer. He was an Indian Gorkha. He composed a number of patriotic songs including Qadam Qadam Badhaye Ja and Shubh Sukh Chain whilst serving in the Indian National Army.

Later in life, Captain Singh worked for the Uttar Pradesh Provincial Armed Constabulary (PAC) and founded the Constabulary band.

== Early life ==
Capt Ram Singh Thakuri was born in Bhagsu Khaniara village near Dharamsala, on August 15, 1914. His father Havaldar Delip Singh groomed Ram Singh to join the Army. After passing middle examination, he joined the IInd Gorkha Rifles in 1927 at Dharamsala cantonment as a recruit boy in the band. "I was inspired by my maternal grandfather Nathu Chand to learn music. Later on, I got training from renowned British musicians Hadson and Danish in brass band, string band and dance band in Army. I also learnt the violin from Capt Rose."

== Service ==
In the Army, Singh combined his love for music along with his service. He trained in classical and western music as well as ballad, brass band, string band and dance band. Apart music, he was fond of football, sports and wrestling.

=== British Indian Army ===
Singh earned the King George VI medal while serving in the Khyber-Pakhtunkhwa between 1937 and 1939. Promoted in 1941 to Company Havildar Major, he was sent to Singapore and Malaya with his unit during World War II.

=== Indian National Army ===
In December 1941, the Japanese forces attacked the Malaya-Thailand border and forced the British army to make a retreat. As many as 200 Indian soldiers were arrested by the Japanese.

On February 15, 1942, Singapore was conquered by Japan as a result of which the INA got a fillip. Capt Ram Singh also joined the INA to free himself from the clutches of Japanese. Subhas Chandra Bose was instrumental in tapping the talent of Captain Ram Singh as a dedicated music director. Captain Ram Singh recalled, "Subhasji told me that the tune of Qaumi Tarana should be so powerful and inspiring that when INA soldiers render the same, it should stir the soul of not only the soldiers but millions of Indians also, as such we kept on practising the Qaumi Tarana at Deedadri camp in Singapore. I vividly recall the words uttered by Subhas Chandra Bose about the Qaumi Tarana. He had said, ‘Ram Singh, the day Indian National Army takes shape in the Cathay Building of Singapore the song Subh Sukh Chain Ki Barkha Barse would be played. The song should have such an indelible impact and force that the Cathay Building should ‘break’ into two parts and the sky should become visible. The gods and goddesses will shower flowers straight on the Tricolor of India.’ On October 31, 1943, the INA came into power and my orchestra played the Qaumi Tarana. The Cathay Building reverberated thunderously. It was a humble step towards liberating India from the British rule."

In 1944, Capt Ram Singh was decorated by Subhas Chandra Bose with a gold medal. "The gold medal was sent to Rangoon after my departure from Singapore to Rangoon. Netaji wanted that the gold medal should be presented to me by the Indian Government on some historic day. But this could not happen. Later on, General Lokanand presented this gold medal to me at Rangoon in the presence of all INA officers on January 23, 1944." Netaji had sent a citation which was read out at the function: "Today we are presenting the gold medal to Captain Ram Singh for his musical creation on behalf of the supreme command of the INA." This Qaumi Tarana of the INA was sung by 30 lakh Hindustanis settled in East Asia.

=== Return to India ===
After the end of the war, Singh was shipped back to India with his fellow soldiers. Imprisoned at the Kabul Lines of the Delhi Cantonment, Captain Ram Singh had an opportunity to play the National Anthem of the INA in the presence of Mahatma Gandhi in Delhi. "We were imprisoned at Kabul line cantonment in Delhi. About 7 p.m. we were asked to get ready. Two or three cars stopped in front of our barrack. The flag of Army General was fixed on the first car. Bapuji stepped down from the General’s car. He was accompanied by Sardar Patel. We were all in queue. Mahatmaji said, ‘With the mercy of the British Government, I have got an opportunity to meet you people’. Then Bapuji asked about the name and village of each INA soldier. General Bhonsle of the INA made a plea to Sardar Patel that the INA soldiers wanted to play the Qaumi Tarana. Bapuji sought permission from the English Army General who readily gave it".

India attained Independence on August 15, 1947, and the next morning Jawaharlal Nehru unfurled the Tricolour on the ramparts of the Red Fort and addressed the nation. It was on this occasion that Capt Ram Singh was especially invited to play the tune of Qaumi Tarana of the INA along with the members of his orchestra group. Later the duration of the tune was shortened with changes in the original script. However, the musical composition was adopted in its original form.

== Post 1947 ==
Captain Ram Singh Thakuri (extreme right) playing the violin in Gandhi's presence, during one of Gandhi's visits to INA prisoners at Red Fort, 20 June 1946

Ram Singh was recruited in the 3rd Battalion PAC at Lucknow, Uttar Pradesh in 1948 by Shri Jagdish Prasad Bajpai [Commandant – 3rd Bn. PAC], and later was promoted as the Band Master in the Rank of Inspector. Thakuri retired in 1974. Upon retirement he was accorded the honorary rank of DSP. He was known as "DSP Band UP Police" at the time of his retirement. He was honoured by the Central Government, as well as the Governments of Uttar Pradesh and Sikkim.

== Final years ==
Captain Singh's final years were difficult and controversial, for which the Government drew much criticism. He was initially denied the status of a freedom fighter by the government, while the State government of Uttar Pradesh later faced contempt proceedings for withholding the corresponding payment although the amount in question was meager. A controversial court petition at one point sought to establish that he was not the composer of the National Anthem.

Captain Singh suffered an epilepsy attack in 2001, and after suffering ill health for nearly a year, died on 15 April 2002. He was cremated with State honours at Bhaisakund. However the State Government of Uttar Pradesh was again criticised for the absence of notable or prominent Government officials, except a few police officers.

== Awards ==
Over his long career, Captain Ram Singh earned a number of awards. These included:

- George VI Medal, 1937
- Netaji Gold Medal(Azad Hind), 1943
- Uttar Pradesh 1st Governor Gold Medal, 1956
- President Police Medal, 1972
- UP Sangeet Natak Akademi (UP Music and Drama Academy) Award, 1979
- Sikkim Government Mitrasen Award, 1993
- The First Azad Hind Fauj Award by the West Bengal Government in 1996

== See also ==
- Kumaoni people
