= Hakirah =

Hakirah may refer to:

- (Medieval) Jewish philosophy
- Hakirah (journal), a peer-reviewed academic journal in the field of halakha and Jewish thought

== See also ==
- Shakira (disambiguation)
