= Sabrina (Mexican TV series) =

Sabrina is a television show that currently airs on TeleHit. It is hosted by Sabrina Sabrok (hence the show's title).

== Plot ==
The show mainly consist of Sabrina and other actors and actresses putting on skits related to sex, and airing music videos in between. The music videos chosen to air on the show are usually videos of songs that have been deemed inappropriate or trashy. The show's full title is Sabrina, El Sexo en su Máxima Expresión.

== Rating ==
The show's rating differs from MA to NR. It airs on most weekdays around 12 am.
