= Sarai, Altai Krai =

Sarai Сараи
- Selo
- Location within Altai Krai Location within Russia
- Coordinates: 53°11′N 83°15′E
- Country: Russia
- Region: Altai Krai
- District: Pavlovsky District
- Time zone: UTC+7:00

Sarai (Russian: Сараи) is a rural locality (a selo) in Stukovsky Selsoviet, Pavlovsky District, Altai Krai, Russia. The population was 410 as of 2013. There are 3 streets.

== Geography ==
Sarai is located 34 km southeast of Pavlovsk (the district's administrative centre) by road. Cheryomnoye is the nearest rural locality.
