= El Saraya (neighborhood) =

El Saraya السرايا
- Location in Egypt
- Coordinates: 31.250378°N 29.975324°E
- Country: Egypt
- Governorate: Alexandria
- City: Alexandria
- Time zone: UTC+2 (EET)
  - Summer (DST): UTC+3 (EEST)

El Saraya (Arabic: السرايا) is a neighborhood in Alexandria, Egypt.

== See also ==
- Neighborhoods in Alexandria
