= Turai =

Nigerian given name

- Gender: Unisex
- Language: Hausa

Origin
- Origin: Nigerian
- Meaning: European
- Region of origin: Northern, Nigeria

Turai is a Nigerian unisex given name predominantly used among the Hausa communities. It means "European".

Notable individuals with the name include:

- Turai Yar'Adua (born 1957), widow of the former Nigerian president.
