= Shokri Kola =

Shokri Kola شكری كلا
- Neighborhood
- Location within Iran
- Coordinates: 36°38′45″N 51°28′58″E
- Country: Iran
- Province: Mazandaran
- County: Nowshahr
- Bakhsh: Central
- City: Nowshahr

Population (2011)
  - Total: 1,583
- Time zone: UTC+3:30 (IRST)

Shokri Kola (Persian: شكری كلا, also Romanized as Shokrī Kolā) is a neighbourhood in the city of Nowshahr, in Mazandaran Province, Iran. It was formerly a village in Kheyrud Kenar Rural District, in the Central District of Nowshahr County.

At the time of the 2006 National Census, the village's population was 530 in 127 households. The following census in 2011 counted 1,583 people in 463 households.
