= Sarah (Johnson book) =

2008 biography of Sarah Palin by Kaylene Johnson

Sarah: How a Hockey Mom Turned Alaska's Political Establishment Upside Down
- Author: Kaylene Johnson
- Language: English
- Genre: Biography
- Publisher: Epicenter Press
- Publication date: May 2008
- Publication place: United States
- Pages: 160
- ISBN: 978-0-9790470-8-4
- Dewey Decimal: 979.8/052092 B 22
- LC Class: F910.7.P35 J64 2008

Sarah: How a Hockey Mom Turned Alaska's Political Establishment Upside Down is a biography of Sarah Palin, written by Kaylene Johnson before Palin was nominated for the Vice President of the United States. It describes her upbringing and her quick rise to power as Governor of Alaska.

The book was called the "definitive primer" on Palin as of the time of her vice-presidential nomination.

== History ==
The author, Kaylene Johnson, is a longtime Alaska resident who lives outside of Wasilla, where Palin had served as mayor. Epicenter Press, which published the book, is a small publisher of books about Alaska, based in Seattle, Washington, run by editor Kent Sturgis, who was raised in Alaska.

Surgis approached Johnson for a "quick turnaround" biography of Palin, who was then Governor of Alaska. He gave her three months to write the book, which would be published and distributed within a further three months. She accepted because she had long admired Palin and wanted to learn more about the Governor.

In September 2008, after Palin's nomination as vice president, it was reprinted by Tyndale House.

== Public and critical reception ==
The book had been selling relatively well in Alaska, with 6,500 books in print and 3,500 on order four months after publication. However, the vice presidential nomination by John McCain of the book's subject, who was then relatively unknown as a national political leader, caused an upsurge of interest. The day after McCain's announcement Barnes & Noble telephoned for an order of 15,000 copies. As of late October 2008, the book had been on The New York Times Best Seller list for six weeks, peaking at number three, with more than 350,000 in print.

The book has been described as "upbeat", "friendly", "admiring", and "laudatory".

== See also ==
- Going Rogue: An American Life
- Going Rouge: Sarah Palin An American Nightmare
