= Shukriya (TV series) =

- Genre: Reality show
- Opening theme: Yeh Rishta Kitna Gehra Hai by Joyel Mukharjee & Plabita Borthakur
- Country of origin: India
- Original language: Hindi
- No. of seasons: 1
- No. of episodes: 13

Production
- Production location: India
- Running time: 30 minutes
- Production company: Frames Production

Original release
- Network: Zindagi
- Release: 9 August – 1 November 2015

Shukriya (English Thank you, Hindi शुक्रिया) is an Indian reality television program, the first original program, broadcast by Zindagi channel. Frames Production produced the show. The show revolves around the channel's philosophy of connecting hearts (originally Jodey Dilon Ko).

The channel has partnered with India's largest Radio Network Big FM, to bring alive the spirit of its first non-fiction show Shukriya. The show's tagline is 'Real People Aur Real Emotions Se Bana Ek Naya Reality Show' (English: A New Reality Show Made Up of Real People and Their Real Emotions).

== Plot ==
In each of its episodes to recognize and honor the spirit of the "uncommon" people who made the life of the common man special, Shukriya provides a platform for individuals to share stories of their bonding with their loved ones and say "thank you" to them in front of the camera. In each episode, a person is thanked uniquely and creatively.

There was also a special episode on the occasion of Teacher's Day in which an ex-student uniquely thanked his teacher.

== Host ==
Shukriya was hosted by actor and anchor, Gunjan Utreja.

== See also ==
- Zee Zindagi
- List of programs broadcast by Zee Zindagi
