= Shukria Asil =

Afghan women's rights activist

- Arabic: شكرية أصيل
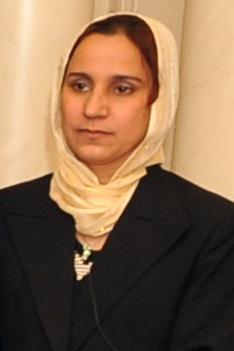
- Shukria Asil in 2010

Shukria Asil (Arabic: شكرية أصيل) is an Afghan women's rights activist. In 2009, she succeeded in reversing the sacking of three women teachers in Baghlan, who had been fired due to negative information being published about them by the Ministry of Education. As of 2010, she was one of four female members of the Baghlan Provincial Council, and as of 2012 she was the head of the Baghlan Provincial Culture and Information Department.

Asil also intervened in the case of a girl rejected by her family for being gang-raped, successfully reuniting the family, although the provincial governor had discouraged her from doing so. Her other work for women's rights includes creating networking groups for women, promoting women's driving schools, and expanding educational opportunities for young girls.

She has faced threats of kidnapping and death for her work, and had to change her address at least once.

She received the 2010 International Women of Courage Award.
