= Sabine Island (Nunavut) =

Island in the Canadian Arctic

- Location in Nunavut Sabine Island (Nunavut) (Canada)

Geography
- Location: Gulf of Boothia
- Coordinates: 67°38′N 86°37′W
- Archipelago: Arctic Archipelago

Administration
- Canada
- Territory: Nunavut
- Region: Qikiqtaaluk

Demographics
- Population: Uninhabited
- Source: Sabine Island at Atlas of Canada

Sabine Island is an uninhabited island located in Nunavut's Qikiqtaaluk Region within the northern Canadian Arctic. It is in eastern Gulf of Boothia's Committee Bay, south of Wales Island and west of the mainland's Melville Peninsula.
