= Mount Sabine (Alaska) =

Mountain in Alaska, United States

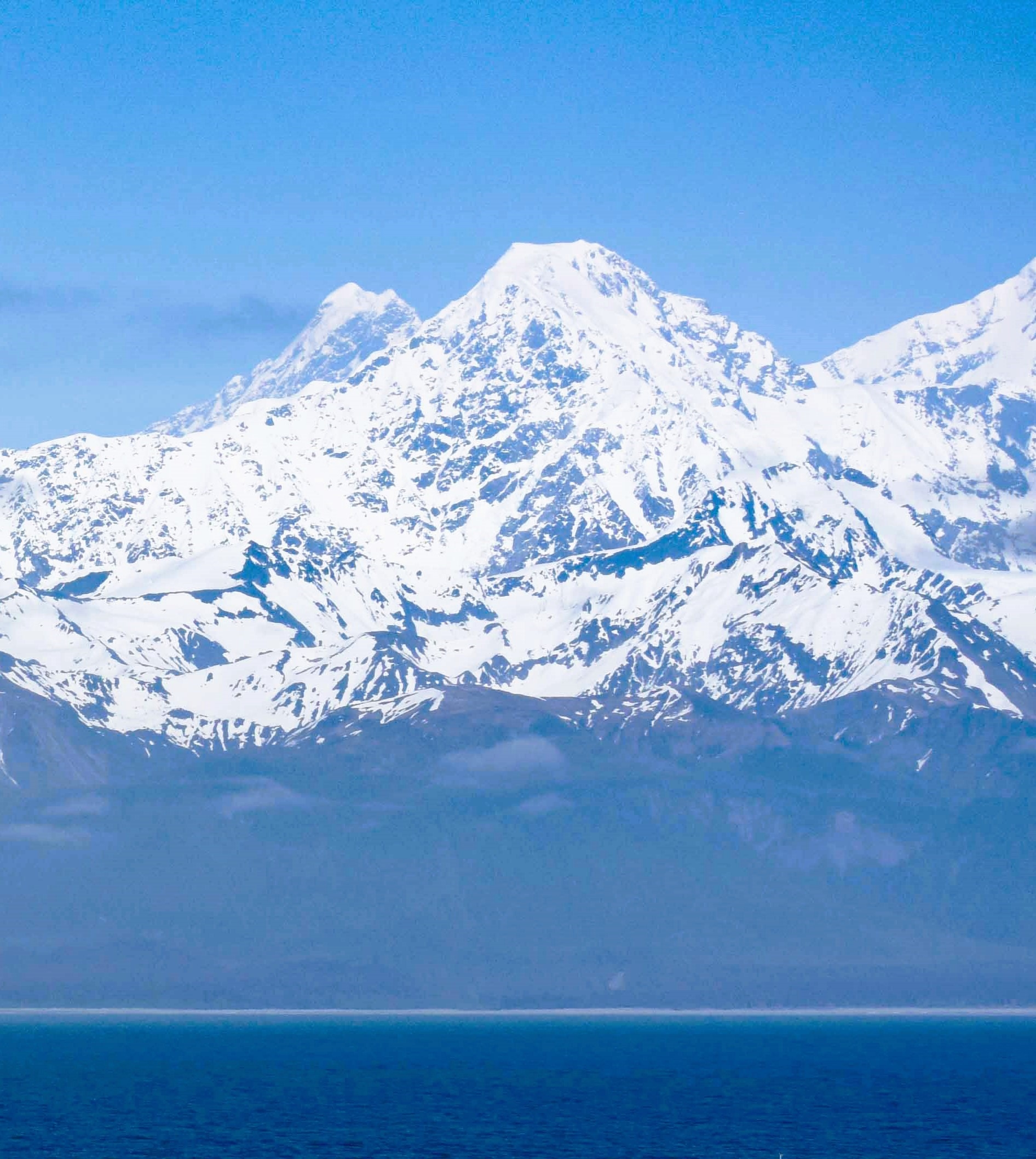
- West aspect

Highest point
- Elevation: 10,405 ft (3,171 m)
- Prominence: 1,955 ft (596 m)
- Parent peak: Lituya Mountain
- Isolation: 2.86 mi (4.60 km)
- Coordinates: 58°48′59″N 137°30′48″W

Geography
- Location within Alaska
- Interactive map of Mount Sabine
- Country: United States
- State: Alaska
- Census Area: Hoonah–Angoon
- Protected area: Glacier Bay National Park
- Parent range: Saint Elias Mountains; Fairweather Range
- Topo map: USGS Mount Fairweather D-5

Mount Sabine is a 10,405-foot (3,171 m) mountain summit in the US state of Alaska.

== Description ==
Mount Sabine is located in the Fairweather Range of the Saint Elias Mountains. The glaciated peak is set within Glacier Bay National Park and Preserve and is situated 6.2 miles (10.0 km) south of Mount Fairweather. Topographic relief is significant as the summit rises 6,400 feet (1,950 m) above the Desolation Glacier in less than 1.5 miles (2.4 km). The mountain's toponym has not been officially adopted by the U.S. Board on Geographic Names, and it will remain unofficial as long as the USGS policy of not adopting new toponyms in designated wilderness areas remains in effect.

== Climate ==
Based on the Köppen climate classification, Mount Sabine is located in a marine subpolar climate zone, with long, cold, snowy winters, and cool summers. Weather systems coming off the Gulf of Alaska are forced upwards by the Saint Elias Mountains (orographic lift), causing heavy precipitation in the form of rainfall and snowfall. Winter temperatures can drop below 0 °F with wind chill factors below −10 °F. This climate supports the Desolation Glacier on the south slope of this peak and the Fairweather Glacier on the north. The months May through June offer the most favorable weather for viewing or climbing the peak.

== Gallery ==
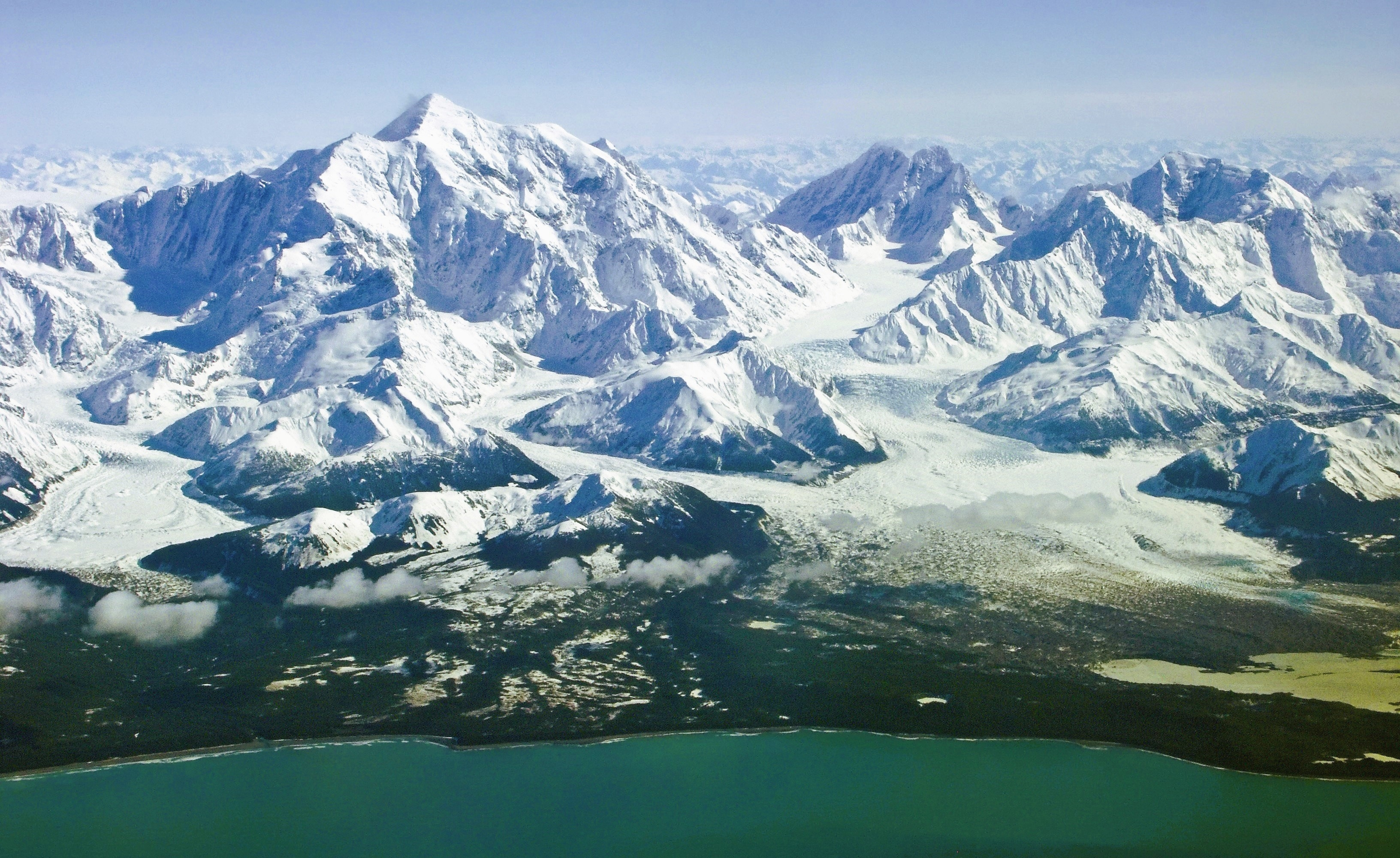
Mount Fairweather to left. Mount Salisbury, Mount Sabine, and Lituya Mountain to right.

== See also ==
- Geography of Alaska
- Mountains of Glacier Bay National Park and Preserve
