= Santa Sabina (disambiguation) =

Santa Sabina (Italian and Spanish for Saint Sabina) may refer to:

- Santa Sabina, the minor basilica of Santa Sabina all'Aventino, a titular church for a cardinal-priest, also center of the Dominican order, in Rome, Italy
- Santa Sabina (band), a Mexican rock group from Guadalajara, Jalisco
- Santa Sabina College, a Roman Catholic Dominican school located in Sydney, Australia

== See also ==
- Sabina (disambiguation)
- Sabinus (disambiguation)
- Sainte-Sabine (disambiguation) (French)
