= Saryoo Singh =

Indian politician

Saryu Singh
- Born: 11 January 1921; Khardigha, Bihar
- Died: 4 April 2012 (aged 91); Aurangabad, Bihar
- Title: Saryu Singh
- Spouse: Rajkumari Devi
- Father: Nandkeshwar Singh

Saryu Singh (Saryoo Singh) was a social thinker, a writer, a philosopher and was one of the prominent leaders during the freedom struggle in Bihar, who later was elected twice as MLA from Aurangabad, Bihar.

== Political life ==
Saryu Singh was one of the prominent freedom fighter from Aurangabad, Bihar and a veteran socialist leader. Post independence, he was made president of freedom fighter federation and was elected twice as MLA from Aurangabad, Bihar.

#	Took office	Left office	Political party
1	1967	1968	Praja Socialist Party
2	1969	1972	Praja Socialist Party
