= Suraiya Hasan Bose =

Indian textile conservator (1928–2021)

- Born: 1928; Etawah, Uttar Pradesh
- Died: 3 September 2021 (aged 93); Hyderabad, Telangana
- Other name: Suraiya Appa
- Education: University of Cambridge
- Occupations: Textile conservator, textile designer
- Years active: 1950s–2021
- Spouse: Aurobindo Bose (m. 1955)
- Relatives: Abid Hasan Safrani (uncle)

Suraiya Hasan Bose (1928–2021) was an Indian textile conservator, designer, and manufacturer, who worked to preserve traditional Indian textile art and techniques. She worked with the Indian Cottage Industries Emporium and the Indian Handloom and Handicrafts Export Corporation before establishing her own textile manufacturing unit to produce traditional Indian textiles. Her designs have been exhibited at the Victoria and Albert Museum.

== Biography ==
Suraiya Hasan was born in 1928 in Etawah, Uttar Pradesh, and raised in Hyderabad, Telangana. Her father, Badrul Hasan, established a bookstore and a handicraft manufacturing unit in Hyderabad. His handicraft unit focused on manufacturing traditional Indian bidri (metalwork) objects. She studied textile design at Cambridge University. Her uncle was the Indian freedom fighter, Abid Hasan Safrani. She later married Aurobindo Bose, the nephew of Indian freedom fighter Subhash Chandra Bose. Her family were significant participants in the Swadeshi movement, a nationalist movement that focused on producing and using native Indian textiles over imported British cotton during colonial rule in India. She died on 3 September 2021, at the age of 93.

== Career ==
After studying textiles at Cambridge University, Hasan Bose joined the Indian Cottage Industries Emporium, a governmental organization dedicated to producing and manufacturing traditional Indian handicrafts. Along with Pupul Jaykar, from the 1950s she managed the Handloom and Handicraft Export Corporation, a public sector undertaking of the Government of India in Delhi, and directed their export unit. During her tenure in Delhi, she collaborated with Indian handloom artists and art conservators such as Kamaladevi Chattopadhyay, Martand Singh and Lakshmi Jain to revive traditional Indian handicrafts.

In the 1970s, Hasan Bose moved back to Hyderabad along with her uncle, freedom fighter Abid Hasan Safrani. She established a textile manufacturing unit on land provided by Safrani. Hasan Bose collaborated with Indian artists to revive two traditional textile forms that nearly ceased to exist. These included himru weave, which derives from Persian textiles and is a complicated brocade weave embroidered with silk, created on custom eight-pedal looms, as well as mushroo, a double-layered cotton and silk weave. Bose hired artisans, catalogued traditional and historical designs, and manufactured both, himru and mashru textiles, as well as other traditional textiles and techniques used in the creation of saris and fabrics, such as paithani, telia rumal, ikat, jamawar, and hand-painted kalamkari. Her unit is currently the only manufacturer of himru textile in India.

In addition to manufacturing textiles, Bose built an archive of traditional motifs for textile patterns in India, using these to create new designs and reconstructing heritage jaalas or graphs used to set looms for weaving patterns. Her original designs were exhibited in the Victoria and Albert Museum in 2015, as part of a special exhibit on the fabrics of India. Bose's designs were supplied chiefly to Indian designers, as well as to Fabindia, but also exported Indian textiles. Bose also established a training unit, in order to teach handloom, weaving, and textile art to widows who did not have other options for employment, as well as a school to provide free education to the families of weavers and handloom artists. In 2019, Bose was the subject of a book that recorded her contributions to textile conservation in India.

== See also ==
- Fabindia
