= Suraiya Nagar =

- village
- Location within Madhya Pradesh Location within India
- Coordinates: 23.100581°N 77.465221°E
- Country: India
- State: Madhya Pradesh
- District: Bhopal
- Tehsil: Huzur

Population (2011)
  - Total: 441
- Time zone: UTC+5:30 (IST)
- ISO 3166 code: MP-IN
- Census code: 482541

Suraiya Nagar is a village in the Bhopal district of Madhya Pradesh, India. It is located in the Huzur tehsil and the Phanda block.

== Demographics ==
According to the 2011 census of India, Suraiya Nagar has 121 households. The effective literacy rate (i.e. the literacy rate of population excluding children aged 6 and below) is 82.14%.

Demographics (2011 Census)
	Total	Male	Female
Population	441	238	203
Children aged below 6 years	77	42	35
Scheduled caste	36	20	16
Scheduled tribe	0	0	0
Literates	299	178	121
Workers (all)	273	146	127
Main workers (total)	141	132	9
Main workers: Cultivators	78	72	6
Main workers: Agricultural labourers	10	8	2
Main workers: Household industry workers	0	0	0
Main workers: Other	53	52	1
Marginal workers (total)	132	14	118
Marginal workers: Cultivators	18	2	16
Marginal workers: Agricultural labourers	111	9	102
Marginal workers: Household industry workers	0	0	0
Marginal workers: Others	3	3	0
Non-workers	168	92	76
