= Sarah (disambiguation) =

Sarah is a biblical matriarch and the wife of Abraham.

Sarah may also refer to:

== People ==
- Sarah (given name)
- Princess Sarah Zeid of Jordan (born 1972), Jordanian and Iraqi princess
- Sarah Ferguson (born 1959), formerly British princess Sarah, Duchess of York
- Saint Sarah, a Romani saint
- Big Time Sarah (1953–2015), American blues singer
- Robert Sarah (born 1945), Guinean Catholic cardinal
- Sarah Toscano, also known simply as Sarah (born 2006), Italian singer-songwriter and actress
- Siti Sarah (1984–2021), Malaysian singer and actress

== Books ==
- Sarah (Card novel), a 2000 novel by Orson Scott Card
- Sarah (Johnson book), a 2008 biography of Sarah Palin
- Sarah (LeRoy novel), a 2001 novel by JT Leroy

== Fictional entities ==
- SARAH, a fictional smart house in the Sci Fi TV series Eureka
- Sarah, a character in the 1933 British romance movie Love's Old Sweet Song
- Sarah, a character in the 1982 Canadian adventure romance movie Paradise
- Sarah, a character in the 1982 American sex comedy The Beach Girls
- Sarah, a character in the 1994 American action thriller movie Raw Justice
- Sarah, a character in the 2000 American fantasy-comedy TV movie Life-Size
- Sarah, an Ed, Edd n Eddy character
- Sarah, a character in the 1989 American-Canadian fantasy drama movie Prancer
- Sarah, a character in the 2007 British black comedy TV movie Dead Clever
- Sarah (Trailer Park Boys character)

== Music ==
- Sarah (album), a 2002 album by Siti Sarah
- Sarah (EP), by Sarah Toscano, 2024
- "Sarah" (Eskimo Joe song), 2006
- "Sarah" (Mauro Scocco song), 1988
- "Sarah" (Thin Lizzy song), 1979
- "Sarah", a song by Serge Reggiani
- "Sarah", a song by Bat for Lashes from the 2006 album Fur and Gold
- "Sarah", a song by Tyler, the Creator from the 2009 album Bastard
- "Sarah", a song by America from the 1977 LP Harbor
- "Sarah", a song by Alex G from the 2012 album Trick

== Places ==
- Sarah, Iran
- Sarah, Kentucky, U.S.
- Sarah, Mississippi, U.S.
- Sarah, West Virginia, U.S.
- Sarah-e Shadadi, Hormozgan Province, Iran

== Other ==
- Sarah (chimpanzee), an enculturated research chimpanzee
- Sarah (cheetah), world's fastest land mammal
- Sarah (film), a 1982 Australian animated film
- Sarah (ship), a list of ships
- Sarah (TV series), a Lebanese soap opera
- Sarah Records, an independent record label from Bristol
- Typhoon Sarah (1959)
- Yad Sarah, Israeli free-loan organization for medical and rehabilitative equipment
- "Search And Rescue And Homing", a British system for Survival radio
- Social Action, Responsibility and Heroism Act 2015

== See also ==
- Saira (disambiguation)
- Saraa (disambiguation)
- Sara (disambiguation)
- Zarah (disambiguation)
- Sehra (disambiguation)
- Saraha, a medieval Indian Buddhist poet
