= Saray, Qubadli =

Saray
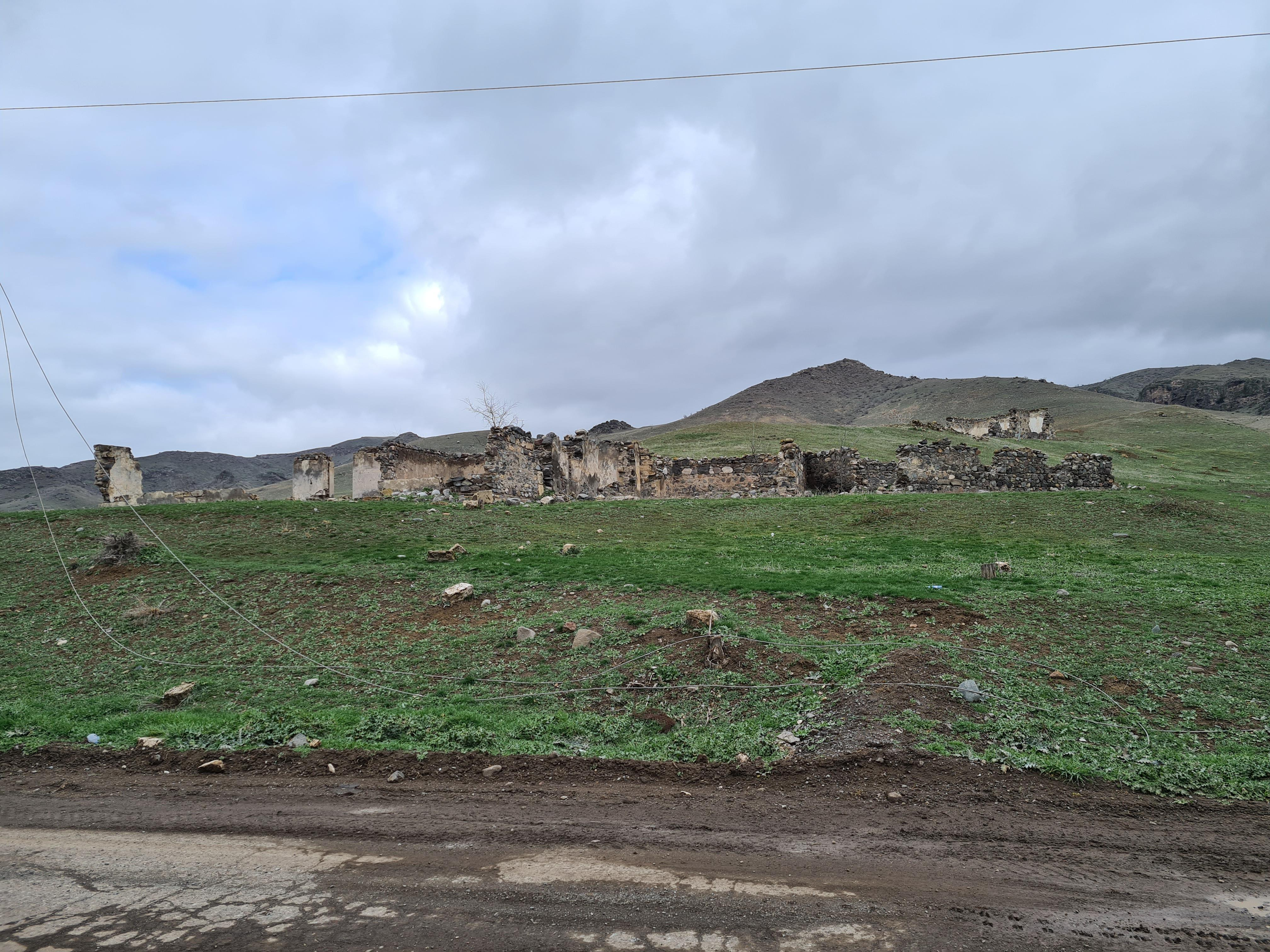

- Location within Azerbaijan
- Coordinates: 39°18′38″N 46°38′02″E
- Country: Azerbaijan
- District: Qubadli
- Time zone: UTC+4 (AZT)

Saray is a village in the Qubadli District of Azerbaijan.

== Gallery ==
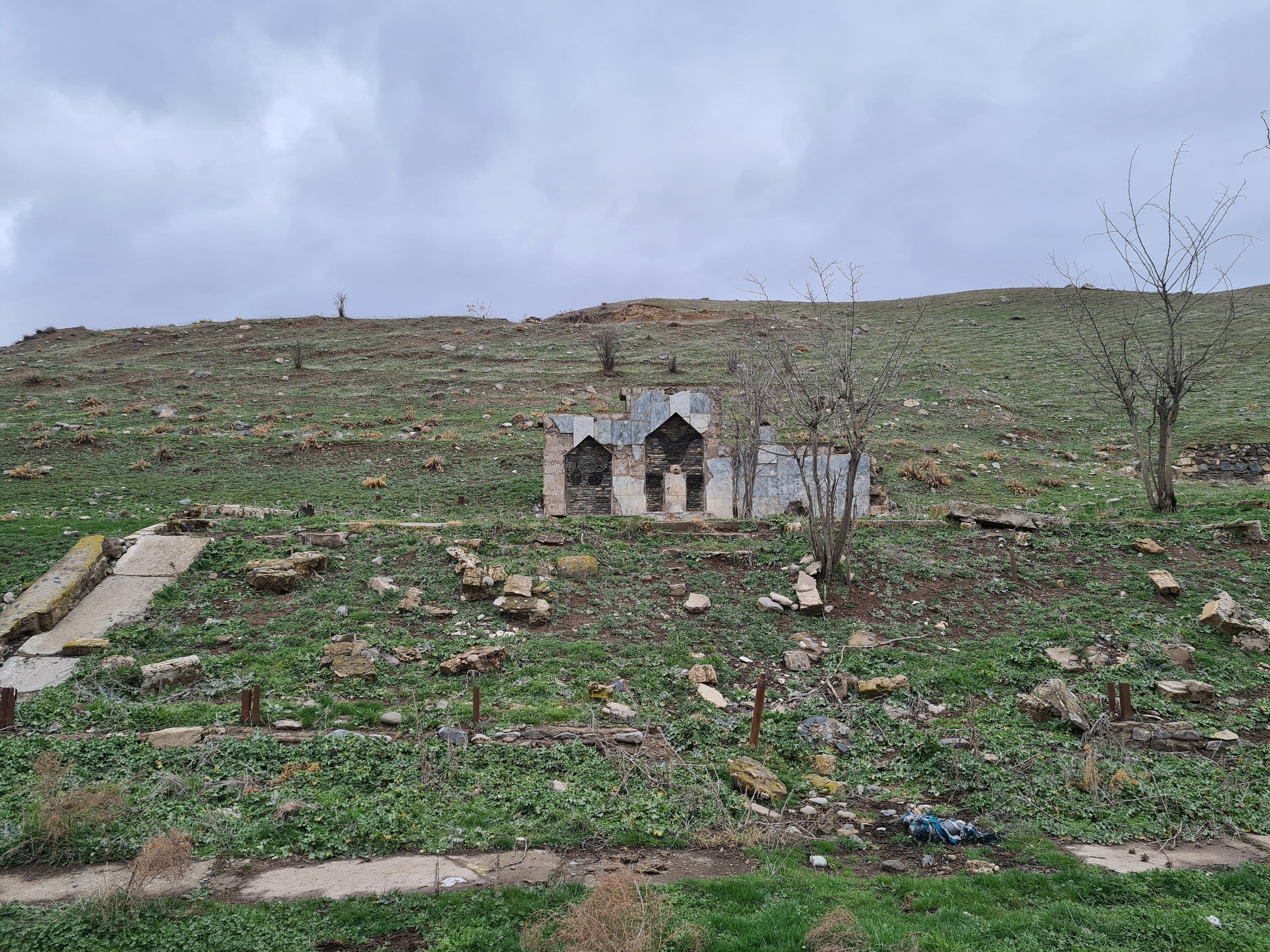
Ruined memorial spring in the village

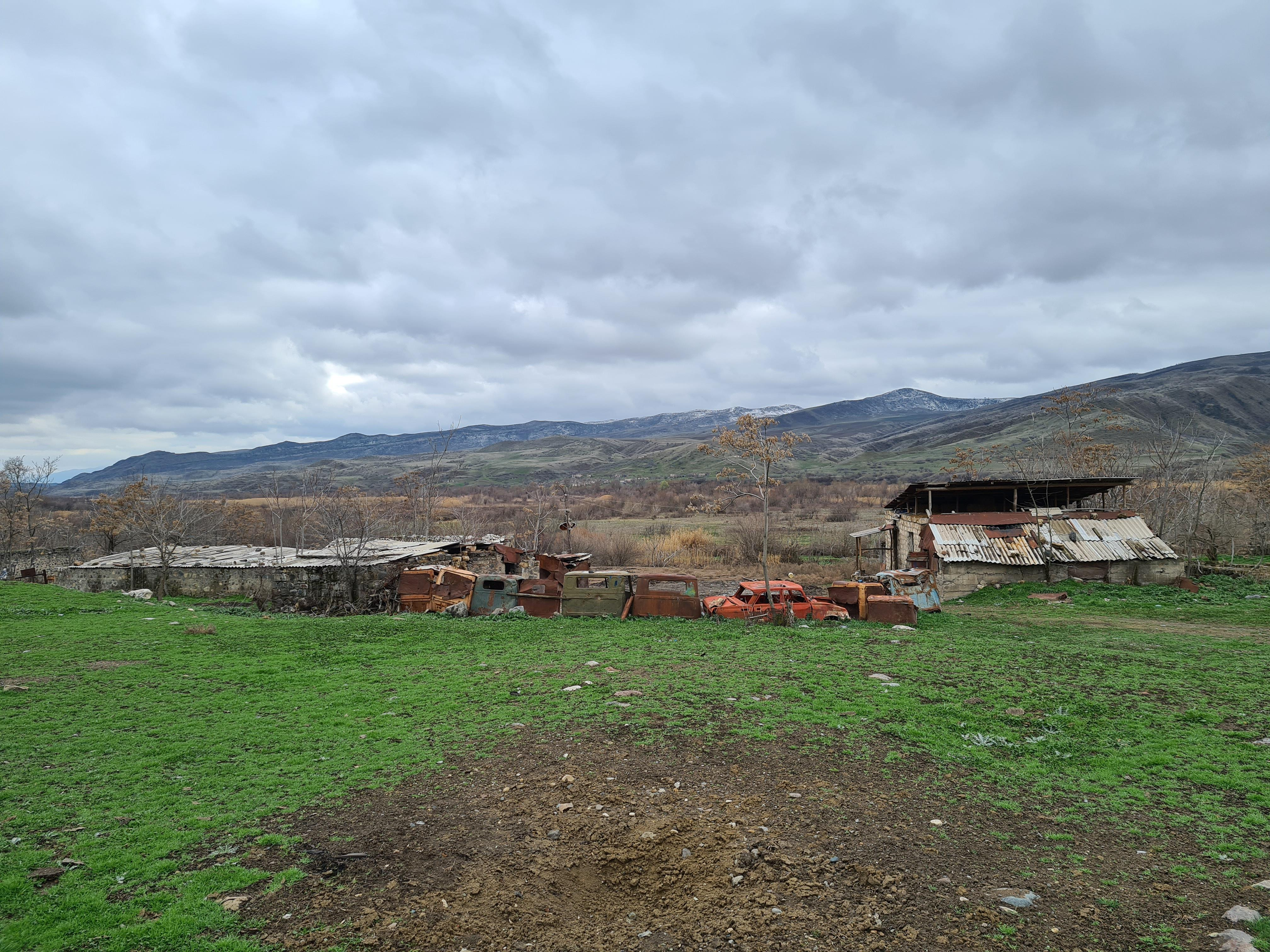

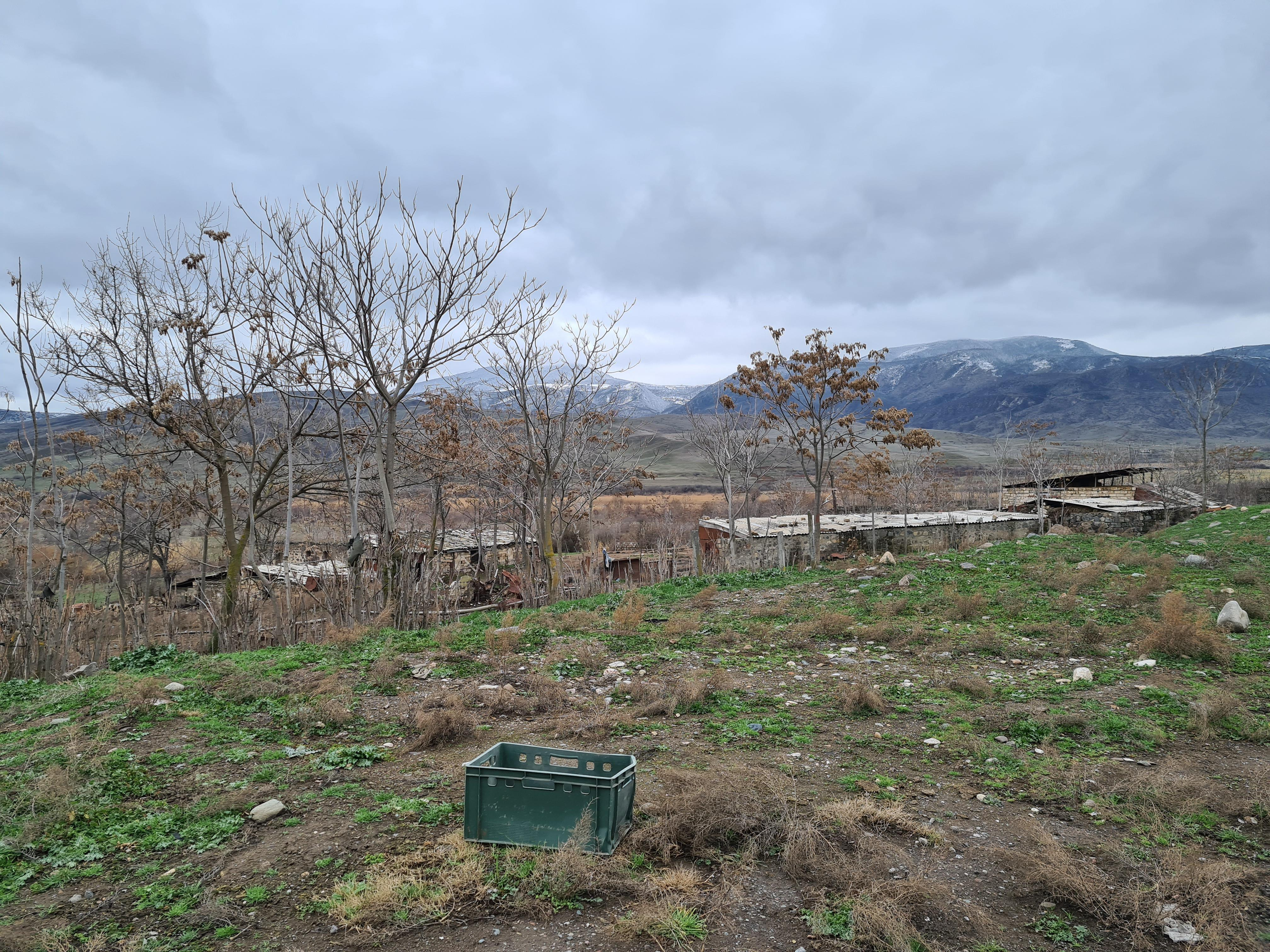

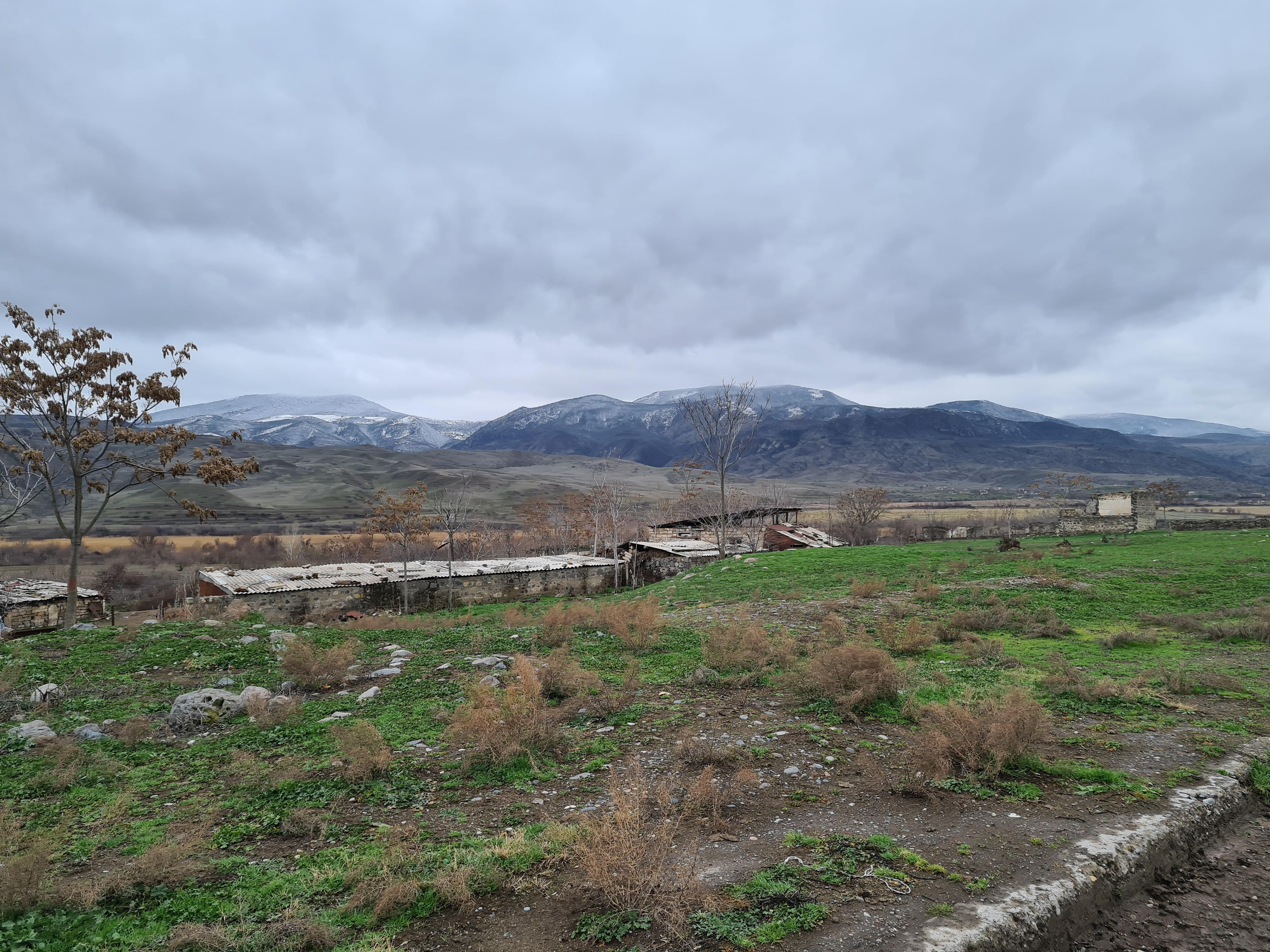
