= Shakira (disambiguation) =

Shakira Isabel Mebarak Ripoll, professionally known as "Shakira" (born 1977) is a Colombian singer-songwriter. Shakira is also a female given name from Arabic, the feminine form of Shakir.

Shakira may also refer to:

- Shakira (album), her self-titled 2014 studio album

== People ==
- Shakira (cheetah), one of the Cheetah stars of BBC's Big Cat Diary
- Shakira Austin (born 2000), American basketball player for the Israeli Elitzur Ramla
- Shakira Caine (born 1947), Guyanese-British actress and fashion model
- Shakereh Khaleeli (1947–1991), Indian murder victim
- Shakira Khan (born 2002), English television personality
- Shakira Martin (model) (1986–2016), Jamaican model
- Shakira Martin (NUS president) (born 1988), British student politician
- Shakira Spencer (1987–2022), English murder victim
- Shakira, fictional character from the Warlord series

== See also ==
- Hakirah (disambiguation)
- Shakila (disambiguation)
- Shakir
- Shakra
