= Sarita =

Sarita may refer to:

== People ==
- Saritha, Indian actress
- Sarita Adhana (born 1987), Indian para-archer
- Sarita Austin, American politician
- Saritha Nair, Indian businesswoman, involved in the 2013 Kerala solar panel scam
- Sarita Choudhury (born 1966), British-Indian actress
- Sarita Colonia (1914–1940), Peruvian folk saint
- Sarita Edgerton, American politician
- Sarita Khajuria (1974–2003), British-Indian actress
- Saritha Komatireddy (born 1984 or 1985), American federal prosecutor and former chief of staff of the U.S. Drug Enforcement Administration
- Sarita Joshi (born 1941), Indian television actress
- Sarita Pérez de Tagle (born 1986), Filipina actress
- Sarita Schoenebeck, American computer scientist
- Laishram Sarita Devi (born 1982), Indian boxer
- Sarita, ring name of professional wrestler Sarah Stock (born 1979)

== Other uses ==
- 796 Sarita, a minor planet
- Saritha (film), a 1977 Indian film
- Sarita (magazine), a Hindi magazine published by Delhi Press Group
- Sarita (play), a 1984 play/musical by Maria Irene Fornes
- Sarita, Texas, United States
- Sarita Lake, Vancouver Island, British Columbia, Canada
- USS Sarita (AKA-39), an Artemis-class attack cargo ship
- a doll in the Manhattan Toy Groovy Girls doll line
- a character in the video game The Walking Dead: Season Two

== See also ==
- Sarit
