= Sabrina =

Sabrina may refer to:

== People and fictional characters ==
- Sabrina (given name), a feminine given name, including a list of persons and fictional characters with the name
- Sabrina (actress), a British actress (1936–2016)
- Sabrina (Greek singer) (born 1969)
- Sabrina (Portuguese singer) (born 1982)
- Sabrina (Filipino singer) (born 1989)
- Sabrina (Cameroonian singer) (born 2002)
- Sabrina Salerno (born 1968), an Italian singer also mononymously known as Sabrina
- Hafren, known in English as Sabrina, a British princess in Welsh mythology and English literature

== Film and television ==
- Sabrina (1954 film), starring Humphrey Bogart, Audrey Hepburn, and William Holden
- Sabrina (1995 film), a remake of the 1954 film starring Harrison Ford, Julia Ormond, and Greg Kinnear
- Sabrina (2018 film), an Indonesian horror film
- Sabrina (Mexican TV series), a Mexican show on the Telehit network, circa 2005
- Sabrina (Bangladeshi TV series), a streaming series

== Music ==
- Sabrina (album), an album by Sabrina Salerno
- "Sabrina", a song by Einstürzende Neubauten
- "Sabrina", a song from Heartbeat of the Earth by Inkubus Sukkubus

== Places ==
- Sabrina Coast, a part of the coast of Antarctica
- Sabrina Ridge, Antarctica
- Sabrina Island, off Antarctica
- Sabrina Island (Azores), a temporary island between June and July 1811
- Sabrina Way, a footpath and bridleway in England
- River Severn or Sabrina, a river in Great Britain
- Lake Sabrina, California, United States

== Ships ==
- HMS Sabrina, the name of four ships of the Royal Navy
- MSC Sabrina, a container ship
- SS Sabrina or SS Empire Buckler, a Liberian cargo ship

== Other uses ==
- Sabrina (comics), a 2018 graphic novel by Nick Drnaso
- Sabrina Online, a 1996 webcomic by Eric W. Schwartz
- 2264 Sabrina, an asteroid
- Statue of Sabrina, an 1857 statue owned by Amherst College
- Senova D20, a 2012–present Chinese subcompact car, sold in Iran as the BAIC Sabrina
- Triumph Sabrina engine, an automotive engine developed by Standard-Triumph in the late 1950s.

== See also ==
- Sabina (disambiguation)
- Sabrina the Teenage Witch (disambiguation)
