= Sabina =

Sabina may refer to:

== Places and jurisdictions ==
- Sabina (region), region and place in Italy, and hence:
- The Roman Catholic Suburbicarian Diocese of Sabina–Poggio Mirteto, Italy
- Magliano Sabina, city, Italy
- Pozzaglia Sabina, city, Italy
- Fara in Sabina, a commune in the province of Rieti, Lazio, Italy
- Palombara Sabina, a town and commune in the province of Rome, Italy
- Sabina Shoal, a disputed atoll of Dangerous Ground in South China Sea
- Sabinas Hidalgo, a municipality in Nuevo León, Mexico
- Sabinas, Coahuila, a municipality in Mexico
- Sabina, Illinois, unincorporated community, United States
- Sabina, Ohio, village, United States
- Sabina Park, Kingston, Jamaica
- Šabina, region in the Sokolov District, Czech Republic
- Al-Sabinah, a town in Rif Dimashq governorate, Syria

== People ==
=== Antiquity ===
- Poppaea Sabina (30–65), wife of the emperor Nero
- Vibia Sabina (83–136/137), wife of the emperor Hadrian, posthumously deified as diva Sabina
- Saint Sabina, dedicatee of the basilica of Santa Sabina

==== Given name ====
- Sabina (judge), Indian high court judge
- Sabina Auffenwerth (1706–1782), German potter
- Sabina Babayeva (born 1979), Azerbaijani singer
- Sabina Chege (born 1972), Kenyan politician
- Sabina Citron (1928–2023), Holocaust survivor, activist, and author
- Sabina Classen (born 1963), German thrash metal singer
- Sabina Cojocar (born 1985), Romanian gymnast
- Sabina Eriksson (born 1967), Swedish murderer accused of manslaughter in Britain
- Sabina Fluxà (born 1980), Spanish businesswoman
- Sabina-Francesca Foisor (born 1989), Romanian chess player
- Sabina Glasovac (born 1978), Croatian politician
- Sabina Guzzanti (born 1963), Italian satirist, actress, writer, and producer
- Sabina Higgins, wife of Michael D. Higgins, President of Ireland
- Sabina Khasayeva (born 1993), Azerbaijani politician
- Sabina Măriuță (born 1995), Romanian figure skater
- Sabina West Miller (1867–1954), American businesswoman
- Sabina Moya (born 1977), Colombian javelin thrower
- Sabina Sciubba (born 1975), German-Italian singer and front woman of the band Brazilian Girls
- Sabina Selimovic, one of two teenage Austrian nationals who went missing in 2014
- Sabina Spielrein (1885–1942), Russian psychoanalyst
- Sabina Wojtala (born 1981), Polish figure skater
- Sabina Wolanski (1927–2011), Polish author and Holocaust survivor
- Sabina Wölbitsch (born 1966), Swiss footballer
- Sabina Wurmbrand (1913–2000), Romanian missionary and human rights activist
- Sabina Yasmin (born 1953), Bangladeshi singer
- Sabina Zimering (1923–2021), Polish-American ophthalmologist and memoirist

==== Surname ====
- Joaquín Sabina (born 1949), Spanish singer, songwriter, and poet
- Karel Sabina (1813–1877), Czech writer
- María Sabina (1894–1985), Mexican (Mazatec) curandera

== Other uses ==
- Sabina (play), 1998 play by Snoo Wilson
- Sabina (film), 1963 film starring Gina Pareño
- Sabina, a character in the 1942 play The Skin of Our Teeth by Thornton Wilder
- Sabina (plant), a genus of junipers proposed in 2022 for Juniperus sect. Sabina
  - Juniperus sabina, the savin juniper, in Juniperus sect. Sabina
- Saniba sabina, of the butterfly genus Saniba
- Sabina, a character in the 2010 film We Are What We Are
- Sabina, a character in the 1984 novel The Unbearable Lightness of Being
- Sabina Wilson, a character in the 2019 film Charlie's Angels
- Sabina (oil)

== See also ==
- Sabine (disambiguation)
- Sabrina (disambiguation)
- Santa Sabina (disambiguation)
