= Seraiah =

High Priest of Israel

Seraiah or Sraya (שְׂרָיָה "Soldier/Prince/Princess of/is the LORD", Standard Hebrew Səraya, Tiberian Hebrew Śərāyā) is the name of several people mentioned in the Hebrew Bible, and a name with other non-biblical uses.

== Biblical characters ==
- Seraiah, son of Tanhumeth
- Seraiah, son of Azriel
- Seraiah ben Neriah

== Others ==
- Sariah - according to the Book of Mormon, the wife of Lehi, and the mother of Laman, Lemuel, Sam, and Nephi
- Zrahia, a religious moshav in southern Israel.

== Contemporary ==
- Serayah McNeill (born 1995), American actress, singer
