= Sara =

Sara may refer to:

== People ==
=== A ===
- Sara Aagesen, Spanish chemical engineer
- Sara Ibrahim Abdelgalil, Sudanese doctor and activist
- Sara Aboobacker (1936–2023), Indian writer and translator
- Sara Addington, children's book author and journalist
- Sara Adler, Russian-born American actress in the Yiddish theater
- Sara Ahmadi, musical artist
- Sara Ahmed (born 1969), British-Australian writer
- Sara Ahmed (born 1998), Egyptian weightlifter
- Sara Akbar, Kuwaiti scientist and activist
- Sara Aldrete, Mexican serial killer
- Sara B. Aleshire (1947–1997), American epigrapher and historian of ancient Greek religion
- Sara Alexander (born 1976), British actress
- Sara Alexandri (1913–1993), Russian artist
- Sara Allen (born 1954), American songwriter
- Sara Allgood (1880–1950), Irish-American actress
- Sara Alpern, professor of United States history
- Sara al-Qutiyya or Sara the Goth (fl. 8th century), Visigothic noblewoman
- Sara Andersson (born 2003), Swedish biathlete
- Sara Angelucci, Canadian artist
- Sara Antunes (born 1975), Portuguese sport shooter
- Sara Anzanello (1980–2018), Italian volleyball player
- Sara Arai, Chinese-Japanese fashion designer
- Sara Arber, British sociologist and professor
- Sara Arjun (born 2005 or 2006), Indian actress
- Sara Ashurbeyli, Azerbaijani historian and scholar
- Sara Aviel, American government official
- Sara Azmeh Rasmussen (born 1973), activist

=== B ===
- Sara Bache-Wiig, American mycologist
- Sára Bácskai, Hungarian short track speed skater
- Sara Badr (born 1987), Egyptian squash player
- Sara Bailey (born 1994), Canadian-Iranian-Sierra Leonian boxer
- Sara Bakri (born 1989), Lebanese football and futsal player
- Sara Ballantyne, multiple people
- Sara Ballingall, Canadian actress
- Sara Bals, Belgian nanoscientist
- Sara Balzer (born 1995), French fencer
- Sara Banerji, British artist, sculptor, and writer
- Sara Bannerman, Canadian communications professor
- Sara Banzet, French diarist and educator
- Sara Baraka, Egyptian rower
- Sara Baras, Spanish flamenco dancer and choreographer
- Sara Barattin, Italian rugby union player
- Sara Bareilles (born 1979), American musician
- Sara Barron, American comedian and writer
- Sara Bates (born 1944), American mixed-media artist
- Sara Battaglia, Italian fashion designer
- Sara Battaglia, (born 1986), Italian karateka
- Sara Bayón, Spanish gymnast
- Sara Sun Beale (born 1949), American law professor
- Sara Benincasa, American comedian and author
- Sara Bennett, British visual effects artist
- Sara Benz (born 1992), Swiss ice hockey player
- Sara Berenguer (1919–2010), Catalan anarcho-syndicalist and anarcha-feminist writer and activist
- Sara Bergen, Canadian cyclist
- Sara Berkai, British-Eritrean social entrepreneur
- Sara Berman, multiple people
- Sara Berner (1912–1969), American actress
- Sara Berry, American economist
- Sara Bertschinger, American politician
- Sara Beysolow Nyanti, UN officeholder from Liberia
- Sara Biala (1881–1963), Polish-American stage actress
- Sara Billey (born 1968), American mathematician
- Sara Black, American artist
- Sara Blackwell, American attorney
- Sara Blædel, Danish writer
- Sara Blakely (born 1971), American businesswoman
- Sara Bongini (born 2002), Italian sport shooter
- Sara Bonifacio (born 1996), Italian volleyball player
- Sara Bossio, Uruguayan lawyer and judge
- Sara Bost, African-American politician
- Sara Botsford (born 1951), Canadian actress
- Sara Bottarelli, Italian long-distance runner
- Sara Bradley, American chef
- Sara Brajovic, French blogger, model, musician, and actress
- Sara T. Brand, American business executive
- Sara Braun, Latvian-Chilean businesswoman
- Sara Braverman (1918–2013), Jewish parachutist in World War II
- Sarah Brightman (born 1960), British soprano
- Sara Bronfman, marketing executive
- Sara Buijskes (1886–1970), South African photographer
- Sara Bullard, American writer
- Sara Bustad, American hockey player

=== C ===
- Sara Cahier, American opera singer and teacher
- Sara Caiazzo (born 2003), Italian footballer
- Sára Čajanová, Czech ice hockey player
- Sara Cakarevic, French tennis player
- Sara Caldwell, American screenwriter
- Sara Call, Swedish footballer
- Sara Camara (born 1940), Malian sprinter
- Sara Camarena, golfer and winner of the 2020 California Women's Amateur Championship
- Sara Cambensy, American politician
- Sara Campbell, British free diver
- Sara Câmpean, Romanian footballer
- Sara Camposarcone, Canadian fashion designer and influencer
- Sara Canning, Canadian actress
- Sara Carbonero (born 1984), Spanish journalist
- Sara Carnicelli, Italian long-distance runner
- Sara Carter (1898–1979), American musician
- Sara Casal de Quirós, Costa Rican teacher, writer, and community worker
- Sara Casanova, Italian politician
- Sara Casasola (born 1999), Italian cyclist
- Sara Castañeda (born 1996), Filipino footballer
- Sara Caswell, American violinist
- Sara Cerdas, Portuguese politician
- Sara Cetinja (born 2000), Serbian footballer
- Sara Chacón Zúñiga, Ecuadorian beauty queen
- Sara Chafak, Finnish beauty pageant winner
- Sara Champion (1946–2000), British archaeologist
- Sara Chance, pen name of American writer Lacey Dancer
- Sara Chapman Bull, writer and disciple of Swami Vivikananda
- Sara Chase, American actress
- Sara Conti, Italian pair skater
- Sara Cox (born 1974), British broadcaster and author
- Sara Craven, British writer
- Sara Crowe (born 1966), Scottish actress
- Sara Curruchich, musical artist
- Sara Curry (1863–1940), American educator
- Sara Curtis (born 2006), Italian swimmer

=== D ===
- Sara Davies (born 1984), British businesswoman, entrepreneur, and television personality
- Sara Del Rey, American professional wrestler
- Sara Dosho, (born 1994) Japanese wrestler
- Sara Duterte (born 1978), 15th Vice-President of the Philippines

=== E ===
- Sara Eggesvik (born 1997), Filipino footballer
- Sara Ehrman (1919–2017), American politician
- Sara Eisen, American journalist and broadcaster
- Sara Eklund (born 1974), Swedish professional golfer
- Sara El Bekri (born 1987), Moroccan swimmer
- Sara El-Khouly (born 1988), Egyptian model and beauty queen
- Sara Ellison, astronomer
- Sara Errani (born 1987), Italian tennis player
- Sara Evans (born 1971), American country singer

=== F ===
- Sara Facio (1932–2024), Argentine photographer
- Sara Fagen, American businesswoman and presidential aide
- Sara Fanelli, British artist
- Sara Fantini (born 1997), Italian hammer thrower
- Sara Farb (born 1987), Canadian actress, playwright, and singer
- Sara Farizan, Iranian-American writer
- Sara Feigenholtz, American politician
- Sara Ferrari (runner), Italian marathon runner
- Sara Fladje (born 2005), Swedish politician
- Sara Rowsey Foley (1840–1925), American biographer
- Sara Forestier, French actress
- Sara Forever, French drag performer
- Sara Forsberg (born 1994), Finnish musician and YouTuber
- Sara Foster (born 1981), American actress
- Sara Fulgoni, British vocalist
- Sara Funaro (born 1967), Italian politician

=== G ===
- Sara Gadimova (1922–2005), Azerbaijani singer
- Sara Gagliardi, American politician
- Sara Gama (born 1989), Italian footballer
- Sara Ganim, American journalist
- Sara García (1895–1980), Mexican actress
- Sara García Alonso, Spanish cancer researcher and reserve astronaut
- Sara Geenen, 21st-century American judge
- Sara Gelser Blouin (born 1973), American politician
- Sara Gettelfinger (born 1977), American actress and singer
- Sara Ghislandi, Italian ice dancer
- Sara Ghomi, Iranian footballer
- Sara Gilbert (born, 1975), American actress
- Sara Ginaite, Jewish Lithuanian resistance fighter
- Sara Giraudeau, French actress
- Sara Goldrick-Rab, American professor, sociologist, and writer
- Sara Gómez (1942–1974), Cuban filmmaker
- Sara Gramática (born 1942), Argentine architect

=== H ===
- Sara Haardt, American writer
- Sara Haden (1998–1981), American actress
- Sara Hagemann, Danish academic
- Sara Hagström, Swedish orienteering competitor
- Sara Haider, Pakistani singer, songwriter, and actress
- Sara Haines, American television host and journalist
- Sara Haines Smith Hoge (1864–1939), American temperance advocate
- Sara Hald (born 1996), Danish handball player
- Sara Hall, American runner
- Sara Hallager, American ornithologist
- Sara Harris (born 1969), Canadian scientist and professor
- Sara Hassanin, Egyptian football player and manager
- Sara Hatami (born 2005), Iranian actress
- Sara Hauge, Norwegian-Swedish civil society leader
- Sara Hauman, American chef
- Sara Head, British table tennis player
- Sara Headley, American cyclist
- Sara Hebe, musical artist
- Sara Hector, Swedish alpine skier Olympic champion
- Sara Hershey-Eddy, American journalist
- Sara Hess, American television producer and writer
- Sara Hickman (born 1963), American singer
- Sara Rún Hinriksdóttir (born 1996), Icelandic basketball player
- Sara Hobolt (born 1977), Danish political scientist
- Sara Holmgaard (born 1999), Danish footballer
- Sara Holmgren (born 1979), Swedish handball player
- Sara Holt (born 1946), American sculptor and photographer
- Sara Hooker, Irish computer scientist
- Sara Horowitz (born 1963), American executive and writer
- Sara Hossain, Bangladeshi lawyer
- Sara Hughes (born 1995), American beach volleyball player
- Sara Humphreys, American romance writer
- Sara Hurley (born 1966), British dentist
- Sara Hurtado, Spanish dancer
- Sara Hurwitz, American rabbi

=== I ===
- Sara Ibrahim, British barrister and political activist
- Sara Innamorato (born 1986), American politician
- Sara Ishaq, Yemeni-Scottish film director
- Sara Ishikawa, American architect
- Sara Ismael (born 1999), Egyptian footballer
- Sara Ito, Japanese association football player
- Sara Iverson, American biologist

=== J ===
- Sara Jackson-Holman, American singer-songwriter
- Sara Jacobs (born 1989), American politician
- Sara James (born 2008), Polish singer-songwriter
- Sara Japhet (1934–2024), Israeli biblical scholar
- Sara Jemai (born 2002), Italian javelin thrower
- Sara Jo (born 1993), Serbian singer-songwriter
- Sara Roddis Jones (1909–1975), American clubwoman
- Sara Juli, American dancer and choreographer
- Sara Junevik (born 2000), Swedish swimmer
- Sara Justo, Argentine educator and dentist

=== K ===
- Sara Kaljuvee, Canadian rugby union and sevens player
- Sara Keane (born 1991), American soccer player
- Sara Keays (born 1947), personal secretary of British Conservative politician Cecil Parkinson
- Sara Kenyon British midwife and professor of evidence-based maternity care
- Sara Kestelman, English actress
- Sara Ali Khan (born 1995), Indian actress
- Sara Klein (born 1994), Australian hurdler
- Sara Klisura, Serbian volleyball player
- Sara Koell, Austrian singer-songwriter
- Sara Kolak (born 1995), Croatian javelin thrower
- Sara Kord (born 2005), Palestinian footballer
- Sara Korere, Kenyan politician
- Sára Kousková, Czech professional golfer
- Sara Kragulj, Slovenian rhythmic gymnast
- Sara Kruzan, American convicted (and pardoned) murderer and survivor of child sex trafficking
- Sara Mazo Kuniyoshi, (1910–2006) American dancer and actress
- Sara Kyle, American politician

=== L ===
- Sara La Fountain, Finnish-American chef, author, and designer
- Sara Labrousse, French synchronized swimmer
- Sara Lalama, Algerian actress
- Sara Lamhauge, Faroese footballer
- Sara Lampe, American politician
- Sara Landry, American DJ and producer
- Sara Lane, multiple people
- Sara Lawlor (born 1987), Irish footballer
- Sara Lawrence-Lightfoot, American sociologist
- Sara Lee, multiple people
- Sara Lee Lucas, American drummer
- Sara Leib (born 1981), American jazz vocalist and educator
- Sara Leighton (born 1937), English portrait painter
- Sara Leland (1941–2020), American ballet dancer
- Sara Lennman, Swedish shot putter
- Sara Levi-Tanai (1910–2005), Israeli choreographer and songwriter
- Sara Levinson, American businessperson
- Sara Levy (synchronized swimmer), Spanish synchronized swimmer
- Sara Levy (née Itzig), German harpsichordist, patron of arts, and music collector
- Sara Lewis, American biologist
- Sara Lidman, Swedish writer
- Sara Lindborg, Swedish cross-country skier
- Sara Lindén, Swedish footballer
- Sara Jane Lippincott, American poet
- Sara Lipton, Medieval historian
- Sara E. Lister (born 1940), American lawyer
- Sara Lobo Brites, East Timorese politician
- Sara Löfgren, Swedish singer
- Sara Lomax-Reese, American journalist
- Sara Lombardo, Italian applied mathematician
- Sara López (born 1995), Columbian archer
- Sara Loren, (born 1985), Pakistani actress and model
- Sara Lov (born 1970), American singer-songwriter
- Sara Lowe, American synchronized swimmer
- Sara Lowes, musical artist
- Sara Lumholdt (born 1984), Swedish pop singer and pole dancer
- Sara Lund (born 1973), American drummer
- Sara Lundberg (born 1971), Swedish artist and writer

=== M ===
- Sara Macel (born 1981), American photographer
- Sara MacLean (born 1963), English-born Scottish cricketer
- Sara Macliver, Australian soprano
- Sara Maitland (born 1950), British writer
- Sara Malakul Lane (born 1982), Thai-American actress and model
- Sara Maldonado (born 1980), Mexican actress
- Sara Maliqi (born 1995), Albanian footballer
- Sara Mandiano (born 1958), French singer-songwriter
- Sara Manness (born 2007), Canadian ice hockey player
- Sara Mansoor (born 1988), Pakistani tennis player
- Sara Mansour (born 1993), Australian lawyer and poet
- Sara Marcus, writer and academic
- Sara Martins (born 1977), French actress
- Sara Mattei (born 1995), know professionally as Mara Sattei, Italian singer-songwriter
- Sara Matsumoto (born 1992), Japanese voice actress
- Sara Matthieu (born 1981), Belgian politician
- Sara Mayfield (1905–1979), American writer
- Sara Mayhew, Canadian writer and graphic artist
- Sara Mearns (born 1986), American ballet dancer
- Sara Medina (born 1998), Spanish footballer
- Sara Mednick, American neuroscientist
- Sara Menker (born 1982), Ethiopian businessperson
- Sara Mérida, Spanish footballer
- Sara Mesa (born 1976), Spanish writer
- Sara Minami (born 2002) Japanese actress and model
- Sara Mohammad, Swedish human rights activist
- Sara Mohr-Pietsch (born 1980), British music broadcaster
- Sara Montes (born 1926), Mexican actress
- Sara Montiel (1928–2013), Spanish actress and singer
- Sara Montpetit, Canadian actress and environmental activist
- Sara-Nicole Morales (1986–2021), American woman who was shot dead
- Sara Elisabeth Moræa (1716–1806), Swedish founder of the Linnean Society of London
- Sara Moreira (born 1985), Portuguese long-distance runner
- Sara Morrison (born 1934), British politician
- Sara E. Morse (1871–1933), American school superintendent
- Sara Mortensen (born 1979), French actress
- Sara Moulton (born 1952), American chef
- Sara Moura (born 1988), Portuguese actress and producer
- Sara Murphy, multiple people
- Sara Murray (born 1968), British entrepreneur
- Sara Myers, American librarian

=== N ===
- Sara Nakayama, (born 1974)Japanese voice actress
- Sara Nasserzadeh, social psychologist and author
- Sara Natami, (born 2000) Japanese freestyle wrestler
- Sara Nathan, multiple people
- Sara Negri, mathematical logician
- Sara Nelson, multiple people
- Sara Netanyahu (born 1958), wife of Benjamin Netanyahu
- Sara Nicholls, Welsh lawn bowler
- Sara Niemietz, American singer-songwriter and actress
- Sara Nordenstam (born 1983), Norwegian swimmer
- Sara Nordin, Swedish footballer
- Sara Nović, American novelist
- Sara Noxx, German singer
- Sara Nunes (born 1980), Finnish pop singer
- Sara Nuru (born 1989), German fashion model
- Sára Nysted, Faroese swimmer

=== O ===
- Sara Louisa Oberholtzer (1841-1930), American poet, novelist, and advocate for school savings banks
- Sara Olai, Swedish footballer
- Sara Oldfield, British conservationist
- Sara Oliveira (born 1985), Portuguese swimmer
- Sara Oliver, Canadian curler
- Sara Jane Olson (born 1947), American bank robber
- Sara Olsvig (born 1978), Greenlandic politician
- Sara Omar, Danish-Kurdish author and activist
- Sara Osuna (born 1958), Spanish professor
- Sara Ouzande (born 1996), Spanish canoeist

=== P ===
- Sara Page (1855–1943), British artist
- Sara Palmas, Italian runner
- Sara Pantuliano (born 1969), Italian-born British executive
- Sara Papadopoulou, Cypriot footballer
- Sara Papi, Italian rhythmic gymnast
- Sara Paretsky, American author
- Sara Parkin, British politician
- Sara Pascoe (born 1981), English comedian, presenter, and writer
- Sara Paxton (born 1988), American actress
- Sara Penn (1927–2020), American designer
- Sara Pennypacker, American writer
- Sara Penton, Swedish cyclist
- Sara Phull, Swiss Pediatrician
- Sara Price, American racecar driver
- Sara Prinsep, British socialite
- Sara B. Pritchard, American historian
- Sara Agnes Rice Pryor (1830–1912), American novelist

=== Q ===
- Sara Qaed (born 1990), Bahraini political cartoonist
- Sara Quin (born 1980), American musician

=== R ===
- Sara Raasch (born 1989), American writer
- Sara Rachele (born 1988), American folk singer
- Sara Radcliffe, American medical research advocate
- Sara Radle, American filmmaker and musician
- Sara Radman, German rhythmic gymnast
- Sara Radstone, British ceramic artist and lecturer
- Sara Rahbar (born 1976), Iranian-born American artist
- Sara Rai, Indian writer and translator
- Sara Ramadhani, Tanzanian long-distance runner
- Sara Ramirez (born 1975), American actor
- Sara Ramírez, Spanish table tennis player
- Sara Randolph, American soccer player
- Sara Rankin, biology professor
- Sara Raposeiro (born 1999), Portuguese gymnast
- Sara Rashid (born 1987), British health and post-conflict activist
- Sara Reiling-Hildebrand, American diver
- Sara Renda, Italian ballet dancer
- Sara Renner, Canadian cross-country skier
- Sara Reisman, American curator
- Sara Renda, Italian ballet dancer
- Sara Renner, Canadian cross-country skier
- Sara Riaz (died 2014), Pakistani celebrity chef
- Sara Ricciardi, Italian artistic gymnast
- Sara Riel (1848–1883), Canadian Métis Grey Nun
- Sara Rietti, Argentine nuclear physicist
- Sara Ristovska, Macedonian handball player
- Sara Roache, wife of English actor William Roache
- Sara Tappan Doolittle Robinson (1827–1912), American writer and historian
- Sara Rocha (born 1981), Portuguese pool player
- Sara Rocha Medina, Mexican politician
- Sara Rodriguez (born 1975), American politician
- Sara Romweber, American drummer
- Sara Roosevelt (1854–1941), mother of U.S. President Franklin D. Roosevelt
- Sara Roque, Métis/Ojibwe filmmaker and activist
- Sara Rosario, Puerto Rican sports executive
- Sara Rosen (born 1973), American publisher
- Sara Rosenbaum, American lawyer
- Sara Rostom, Egyptian rhythmic gymnast
- Sara Rothé (1699–1751), Dutch art collector
- Sara Rowbotham, British local councillor, activist, and healthcare worker, known for exposing the Rochdale child sex abuse ring
- Sara Roy, American political economist and scholar
- Sara Ruddick, American philosopher
- Sara Rudner, American dancer, choreographer, and dance educator
- Sara Rue (born 1979), American actress
- Sara Russell, professor of planetary sciences
- Sara Ryan, American writer

=== S ===
- Sara Sabry, Egyptian engineer and citizen astronaut
- Sara Sadíqova (1906–1986), Tatar singer
- Sara Saftleven (1645–1702), Dutch artist
- Sara Saito (born 2006), Japanese tennis player
- Sara Säkkinen, Finnish ice hockey player
- Sara Sálamo, Spanish actress
- Sara Salarrullana, Spanish gymnast
- Sara Saldaña, Spanish synchronized swimmer
- Sára Salkaházi (1899–1944), Hungarian nun
- Sara Sallam (born 1991), Egyptian artist
- Sara Sampaio (born 1991), Portuguese model
- Sara Sánchez (born 1997), Spanish motorcycle racer
- Sara Sankey, British badminton player
- Sara Sawyer, American virologist and educator
- Sara Sax (1870–1949), American artist
- Sara Seager (born 1971), Canadian-American astronomer and planetary scientist
- Sara Seegar (1914–1990), American actress
- Sara Sefchovich (born 1949), Mexican writer, sociologist, and historian
- Sara Šenvald (born 1996), Croatian handballer
- Sara Shagufta, Pakistani poet
- Sara Shakeel, Pakistani artist
- Sara Shamma, Syrian painter
- Sara Shamsavari, British-Iranian artist, photographer, designer, and educator
- Sara Shepard, American author
- Sara Shimizu, (born 2009) Japanese snowboarder
- Sara Sidner, American journalist
- Sara Sigmundsdóttir, Icelandic athlete
- Sara Siipola (born 1997), Finnish singer
- Sara Simeoni, Italian high jumper
- Sara Singh (born 1985), Canadian politician
- Sara Slattery, (born 1981) middle- and long-distance runner
- Sara Smilansky (1922–2006), Israeli professor and researcher
- Sara Snow, American TV personality and organic food activist
- Sara Socas (born 1997), Canarian freestyle rapper
- Sara Soffel (1886–1976), American lawyer and
- Sara Sorribes Tormo (born 1996), Spanish tennis player
- Sara Soskolne (born 1970), Canadian type designer
- Sara Sosnowy (born 1957), American artist
- Sara Sothern (1895–1994), American actress
- Sara G. Stanley, African-American abolitionist and teacher
- Sara Staykova, Bulgarian rhythmic gymnast
- Sara Stewart, American actress
- Sara Stockbridge, English model, actress, and author
- Sara Stokić (born 2005), Serbian footballer
- Sara Storer, musical artist
- Sara Sugarman (born 1962), Welsh actress and film maker
- Sara Sundelowitz, South African lawn bowler
- Sara Sutherland, American runner
- Sara Symington, English cyclist

=== T ===
- Sara Takanashi (born 1996), Japanese ski jumper
- Sara Takatsuki (born 1997), Japanese actress
- Sara Tanaka, American actress
- Sara Tavares (1978–2023), Portuguese singer, composer, guitarist and percussionist
- Sara Tea (born 1978), American musician
- Sara Teasdale (1884–1933), American writer and poet
- Sara Thacher, American immersive designer and Disney imagineer
- Sara Thompson, multiple people
- Sara Thornton, multiple people
- Sara Thunebro (born 1979), Swedish footballer
- Sara Thydén, Swedish swimmer
- Sara Thygesen (born 1991), Danish badminton player
- Sara Tolbert, professor of environmental education
- Sara Torres (born 1991), Spanish poet and novelist
- Sara Tucker, American civil servant and businesswoman
- Sara Tunes, musician

=== U ===
- Sara A. Underwood, American suffragist
- Sara Underwood, American journalist
- Sara Jean Underwood (born 1984), American model
- Sara Uribe
- Sara Uribe Sánchez (born 1978), Mexican poet

=== W ===
- Sara Waisglass (born 1998), American actress
- Sara Imari Walker, American theoretical physicist and astrobiologist
- Sara Watkins (born 1981), American musician
- Sara Webb (dancer), American ballet dancer
- Sara Webb, astrophysicist and science communicator
- Sara Weiss (d. 1904), American spiritualist and author
- Sara West, Australian actress
- Sara Whalen, American soccer player
- Sara Wheeler, English travel author
- Sara White, wife of American athlete Reggie White
- Sara Wilford (1932–2021), American psychologist
- Sara Winter, Brazilian actress and politician
- Sara Wiseman, New Zealand actress
- Sara Wolfe (born 1973), Indigenous Canadian nurse, midwife, and healthcare advocate
- Sara Wolfkind, American actress
- Sara Wood, multiple people
- Sara Wordsworth, Broadway lyricist-librettist
- Sara Wright, Bermudan sailor
- Sara Wüest, Swiss sprinter

=== Y ===
- Sara Yamaguchi (born 2008), Japanese artistic gymnast
- Sara Yorke Stevenson (1847–1921), American archaeologist
- Sara Yuceil, Belgian footballer

=== Z ===
- Sara Zaafarani, Tunisian engineer and politician
- Sara Zabarino, Italian javelin thrower
- Sara Zahedi, Iranian-Swedish mathematician
- Sara Zaker, Bangladeshi actor, director, businesswoman, and social activist
- Sara Zandieh, Iranian American film maker
- Sara Zarr, American writer
- Sara Zewde (born 1985), American landscape architect and professor
- Sara Ziff, American model
- Sara Zohrabi (born 1996), Iranian footballer
- Sara Zyskind, Israeli writer

=== People with the surname ===
- Mia Sara (born 1967), American actress
- Máret Ánne Sara (born 1983), Norwegian Sami artist and author

== Ethnic groups and languages ==
- Sara people, an ethnic group in central Africa
- Sara languages, a language group spoken mostly in southern Chad
- Sara language (Indonesia), a language spoken in Kalimantan in Indonesia

== Arts, media and entertainment ==
=== Film and television ===
- Sara (1992 film), 1992 Iranian film by Dariush Merhjui
- Sara (1997 film), 1997 Polish film starring Bogusław Linda
- Sara (2010 film), 2010 Sri Lankan Sinhala thriller directed by Nishantha Pradeep
- Sara (2015 film), 2015 Hong Kong psychological thriller
- Sara (2023 film), 2023 Indonesian drama film starring Asha Smara Darra
- Sara (1976 TV series), 1976 American western series
- Sara (1985 TV series), 1985 American situation comedy
- Sara (Belgian TV series), 2007–08 Flemish telenovella on Belgian television
- "Sara" (Arrow episode), an episode of Arrow

=== Music ===
- Sara (band), a Finnish band
- "Sara" (Bob Dylan song), a song by Bob Dylan for the 1976 album Desire
- "Sara" (Fleetwood Mac song), a song by Fleetwood Mac from the 1979 LP Tusk
- "Sara" (Starship song), a song by Starship from the 1985 album Knee Deep in the Hoopla
- "Sara", a song by Bill Champlin from the 1981 LP Runaway
- "Sarah" (disambiguation)#Music, songs

=== Fictional characters ===
- Sara H. Suarez-Ligaya, a character from the Filipino drama series Doble Kara
- SARA, several Toonami AI matrix companions
- Sara, a character from the horror comic series Witch Creek Road
- Sara in the animated television series The Haunted House (TV series)
- Sara (Battle Angel Alita) in the manga Battle Angel Alita
- Sara in the TV show Shamanic Princess
- Sara in the animated science fantasy television series Chaotic
- Sara Lance, American superhero Arrowverse franchise
- Sara Tokimura, from the Tokusatsu series, Choushinsei Flashman.
- Sara (mermaid) in the manga and anime series Mermaid Melody Pichi Pichi Pitch
- Sara (Over the Garden Wall) in the animated television miniseries Over the Garden Wall
- Sara in the Wee Sing 1988 film Grandpa's Magical Toys
- Sara, a character from Just Dance 2023 Edition
- Sara the Party Games Fairy, a character from Rainbow Magic
- Sara Pezzini, a character from the Witchblade series
- Kujou Sara, a character in 2020 video game Genshin Impact

=== Other entertainment ===
- Sara (play), or Miss Sara Sampson, 1755 play by the Enlightenment philosopher Gotthold Ephraim Lessing
- Sara, a 2020 Witch Creek Road Season 3 storyline by Garth Matthams and Kenan Halilović

== Legislation ==
- Species At Risk Act, Canadian legislation to protect endangered or threatened organisms and their habitats
- Superfund Amendments and Reauthorization Act, U.S. federal program to fund the cleanup of sites contaminated with hazardous substances and pollutants

== Organizations ==
- San Antonio River Authority, a regional authority in the state of Texas, U.S.
- Scottish Amateur Rowing Association, the governing body for the sport of rowing in Scotland
- Severn Area Rescue Association, a search and rescue organisation covering parts of the River Severn, U.K.
- South African African Rugby Board, a former governing body for black rugby union players
- Southern African Railway Association, an association of railway companies
- State Administration for Religious Affairs, a department of the Chinese Government
- Stichting Academisch Rekencentrum Amsterdam, a Dutch university and research computing cooperative
- Successor Agency to the Redevelopment Agency, a type of local government agency in California

== Places ==
- Sara/Sare, a village in Labourd, France
- Sara, Iran, a village in Kurdistan Province, Iran
- Sara, Kerman, a village in Kerman Province, Iran
- Sara Rural District, an administrative subdivision of Kurdistan Province, Iran
- Sara, Iloilo, a municipality in the Philippines
- Sara Ostrov, alternative name for Nərimanabad, Lankaran, Azerbaijan
- Sara Province, a province of Bolivia
- Sar'a, a former village near Jerusalem
- Nərimanabad, Lankaran or Sara, a village and municipality in Azerbaijan
- Sara, Washington, a town in Clark County
- Lake Sara, a reservoir in Effingham County, Illinois, United States

== Science and technology ==
- Denel SARA (South African Regional Aircraft), a projected turboprop airliner
- SARA (computer) (Saabs räkneutomat), a calculating machine
- Saturate, aromatic, resin and asphaltene, fractions in crude oil
- Smad Anchor for Receptor Activation, or Zinc finger FYVE domain-containing protein 9, a protein
- SARA, an SGML-aware text-searching system that led to the Xaira architecture
- Sara, an Apple III emulator

== Other uses ==
- 533 Sara, a minor planet
- Sara (horse), a breed of small horse from the Logone River area in Chad and Cameroon
- Scanning, Analysis, Response, and Assessment (SARA), a problem-solving model used in policing
- Sara Without an H (SWOH), a phrase used to refer to Philippine Vice President Sara Duterte by her critics

== See also ==
- Saraa (disambiguation)
- Sarabeth
- Sarah (disambiguation)
- Saranya (given name)
- Sareh, several people with this name
- Saria (disambiguation)
- Sarra (disambiguation)
- Sera (disambiguation)
- Sura (disambiguation)
- Šara (disambiguation)
