= Sarah Lewis =

Sarah Lewis may refer to:

- Sarah Charles Lewis (born 2004), American actress
- Sarah-Jane Lewis (born 1987), British soprano
- Sarah Lewis (professor) (born 1979), American author, curator and historian
- Sarah Lewis (alpine skier) (born 1964), British former alpine skier
- Sarah Lewis (writer) (fl. 1839–1848), British writer
- Sarah Jamie Lewis, anonymity and privacy researcher
- Sarah Lianne Lewis (born 1988), Welsh composer
- Sara Lewis, American biologist and firefly expert
