= Balș (disambiguation) =

Balș or Bals may refer to:

== Places ==
- Balș, a town in Olt County, Romania
- Balș, a commune in Iași County, Romania
- Ballsh, a town in Albania

== People ==
- Gert Bals (1936–2016), Dutch footballer
- Gheorghe Balș (1868–1934), Romanian engineer, architect and art historian
- Grigore Balș (died 1895), Moldavian-born Romanian politician
- Huub Bals (1937–1988), Dutch film festival director
- Matei Balș (1905–1989), Romanian bacteriologist
- Sara Bals (born 1977), Belgian nanoscientist
- Teodor Balș (1805–1857), ruler of Moldavia

== Other ==
- BALS Corporation
