= Staykov =

Staykov (Bulgarian Стайков, feminine: Staykova) is a Bulgarian surname. Notable people with the surname include:

- Georgi Staykov (born 1964), Bulgarian actor
- Ivan Staykov (1926–2003), Bulgarian cross-country skier
- Nencho Staykov (born 1955), Bulgarian cyclist
- Nikola Staykov (1907–1974), Bulgarian footballer
- Sara Staykova (born 1993), Bulgarian rhythmic gymnast
- Stefan Staykov (born 1949), Bulgarian footballer
