= Acedo =

Acedo is a surname. Notable people with the surname include:

- Aquilino Acedo (1896–1964), Spanish footballer
- Carmen Acedo (born 1975), Spanish rhythmic gymnast
- Domingo Acedo (1898–1980), Spanish footballer
- Jérémy Acedo (born 1987), French footballer
- Leticia Judith Murray Acedo (born 1979), Mexican actress
- Manuel Aznar Acedo (1916–2001), Spanish journalist and radio personality
- Sara Osuna Acedo (born 1958), Spanish professor
- Sofía Acedo Reyes (born 1985), Spanish politician
