= Macel =

Macel is a surname. Notable people with the surname include:

- Christine Macel (born 1969), French curator
- Sara Macel (born 1981), American photographer
