= Sarra =

Sarra may refer to:

- Chris Sarra (21st century), Australian educator
- Janis Sarra, Canadian lawyer
- Sarra Manning (21st century), writer
- Sarra, Nablus, a town in the West Bank
- Ma'tan as-Sarra, an oasis in Libya

== See also ==
- Sara (disambiguation)
