= James McGinnis =

James McGinnis may refer to:

- James D. McGinnis (1932–2009), American politician, lieutenant governor of Delaware
- James Randy McGinnis (1957–2019), American professor of science education
- J. Michael McGinnis (born 1944), American physician and epidemiologist
- James Anthony Bailey (1847–1906), né McGinnis, American owner and manager of several 19th-century circuses
- Larry McGinnis (James Laurence McGinnis, 1899–1948), American football player
