= Üzümçülük =

Village in Lankaran District, Azerbaijan

Üzümçülük is a village in the municipality of Nərimanabad, in the Lankaran Rayon of Azerbaijan.
