= Max Horttanainen =

Swedish entrepreneur (born 1996)

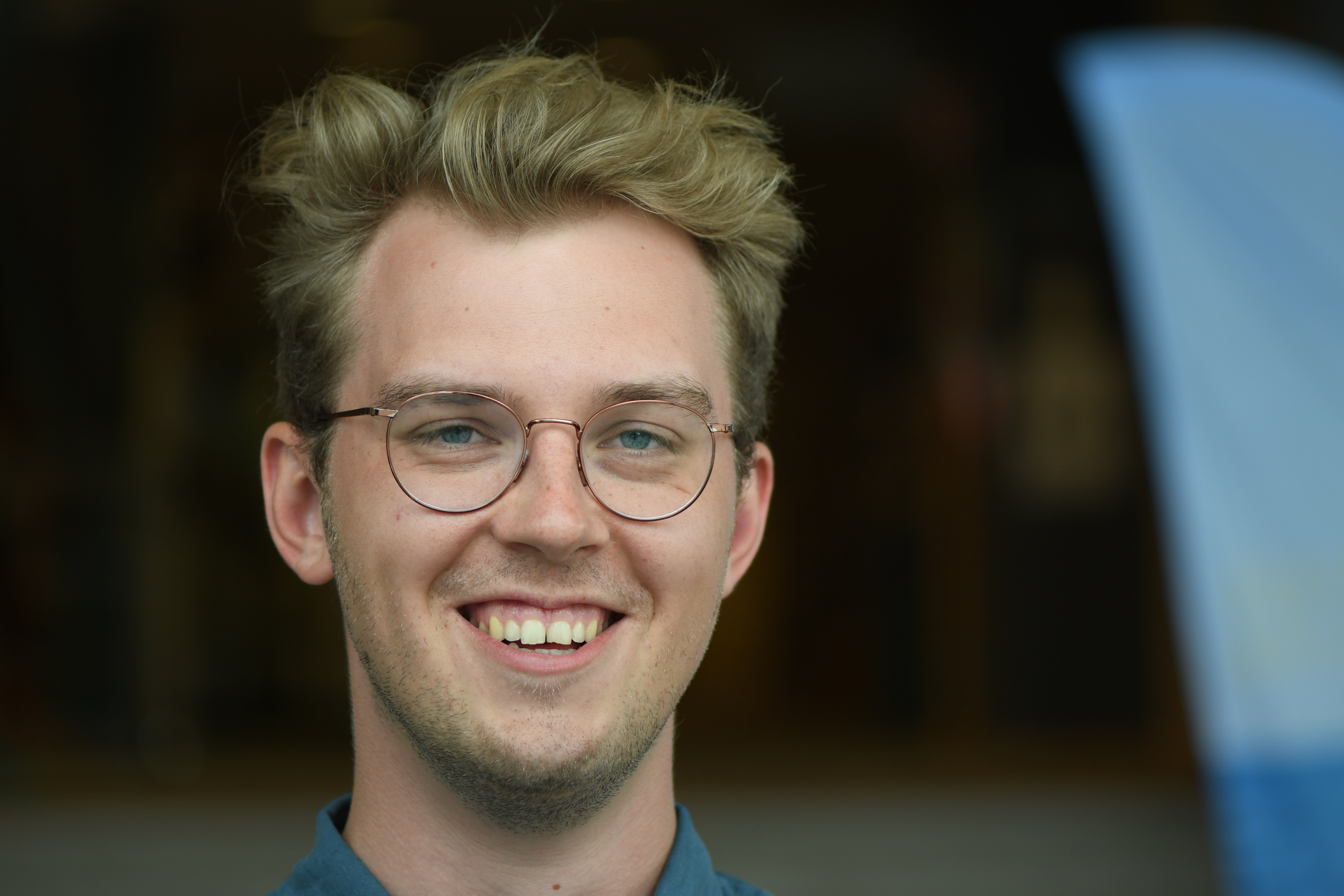
- Born: Max Love Sebastian Horttanainen; 8 November 1996 (age 29); Björkekärr församling, Gothenburg, Sweden
- Education: University of Gothenburg; Göteborgsregionens Tekniska Gymnasium
- Occupations: Chairman, entrepreneur
- Years active: 2016–
- Organization: Sverok
- Title: Förbundsordförande of Sverok
- Predecessor: Alexandra Hjortswang
- Parent(s): Saila Horttanainen, Hans Jönsson
- Relatives: Joel Horttanainen, brother

Max Love Sebastian Horttanainen (born 8 November 1996) is a Swedish chairman, youth leader and entrepreneur in civil society with a particular focus on organisational development, process management and digital realities. Between 2018 and 2020, Horttanainen was chairman of the Swedish e-Sports Federation, and between 2019 and 2020 vice chairman of Sverok. Since 1 January 2021, Horttanainen is Chairman of Sverok. Horttanainen is the former chairman of Sverok Väst.

== Biography ==
Horttanainen was born in Gothenburg.

He runs the consulting company Rainy Lab, where he develops and supports organisations' digital strategies. Through Rainy Lab, he has carried out assignments for organisations such as Bokmässan, Skövde Municipality and the Swedish Teachers' Association. Horttanainen is part of styrelsepost.se and Koncentria, where he works with process management and idea development related to digital realities, as well as annual meeting support.

Horttanainen is one of the top 100 young leaders seen and heard in 2020, according to Makthavare. He was also one of the finalists for the 2019 Stipendiet Kompassrosen awarded annually by Konungens Stiftelse Ungt Ledarskap. Horttanainen is the principal of the Stiftelsen Konung Gustaf V:s 90-årsfond, which provides annual financial support for activities aimed at supporting, strengthening and developing non-profit youth activities.

Horttanainen is a speaker and panellist in areas such as esports, gender equality and diversity. He has organised several LANs and other events focusing on these issues.
