= Sara Murphy =

Sara Murphy may refer to:

- Sara Murphy (patron) (1883–1975), American expatriate art supporter in France
- Sara Murphy (film producer), American film producer
- Sara Alderman Murphy (1924–1995), American civil rights activist

== See also ==
- Sarah Murphy (disambiguation)
