= Sara Tolbert =

New Zealand professor of science and environmental education

Academic background
- Education: University of California, Santa Cruz
- Thesis: Teaching the content in context: Preparing "highly qualified" and "high quality" teachers for instruction in underserved secondary science classrooms (2011)
- Doctoral advisor: Trish Stoddart

Sara Tolbert is an American–New Zealand academic, and is a Professor of Science and Environmental Education at the University of Canterbury, specialising in research to facilitate environmental education, including citizen science and science education pedagogy.

== Academic career ==
Tolbert taught science and English as a second language in the USA, Mexico, Guatemala and New Zealand, before moving into academia. Tolbert has a bachelor's degree in environmental studies from the University of Colorado Boulder, a master's degree from the University of Georgia, and a PhD in science education from the University of California Santa Cruz. Her thesis was titled Teaching the content in context: Preparing "highly qualified" and "high quality" teachers for instruction in underserved secondary science classrooms. She worked as an assistant and then associate professor at the University of Arizona, receiving a National Academy of Education Spencer Postdoctoral Fellowship in 2015. Tolbert's postdoctoral research was focused on facilitating social justice education for minoritized students and teachers.

Tolbert joined the faculty of the University of Canterbury, rising to full professor in 2024. She is Associate Dean (Research) in the Faculty of Education. Tolbert was part of a research team that won the 2022 Advancing Sustainability Knowledge Award at Canterbury, recognising work "in developing an innovative course helping trainee teachers create and contribute knowledge for a better society". Her research covers topics such as citizen science, destreaming in mathematics education, and science education pedagogy. With Professor Diane Mollenkopf, Tolbert is co-leader of the Ōtautahi Food Justice Research Collaborative, and with Professor Ben Kennedy she co-directs Canterbury's Learning for Earth Futures research cluster.

== Selected works ==
- Kristin L. Gunckel; Tolbert, Sara (2018). "The imperative to move toward a dimension of care in engineering education". Journal of Research in Science Teaching. 55 (7): 938–961. doi:10.1002/tea.21458. Wikidata Q125184573.
- Tolbert, Sara; Alexa Schindel; Alberto J. Rodriguez (2018). "Relevance and relational responsibility in justice‐oriented science education research". Science Education. 102 (4): 796–819. doi:10.1002/sce.21446. Wikidata Q125184575.
- Tolbert, Sara (2015). ""Because they want to teach you about their culture": Analyzing effective mentoring conversations between culturally responsible mentors and secondary science teachers of indigenous students in mainstream schools: CULTURALLY RESPONSIBLE MENTORING IN SCIENCE". Journal of Research in Science Teaching. 52 (10): 1325–1361. doi:10.1002/tea.21240. Wikidata Q126909059.
- Tolbert, Sara; Jesse Bazzul (2016). "Toward the sociopolitical in science education" (PDF). Cultural Studies of Science Education. 12 (2): 321–330. doi:10.1007/s11422-016-9737-5. Wikidata Q126909060.
- Edward G. Lyon; Trish Stoddart; George C. Bunch; Tolbert, Sara; Ivan Salinas; Jorge Solis (2018). "Improving the preparation of novice secondary science teachers for English learners: A proof of concept study". Science Education. 102 (6): 1288–1318. doi:10.1002/sce.21473. Wikidata Q125184572.
