= Saraa =

Saraa may refer to:

- Sarantuya (born 1970), Mongolian pop singer
- Susquehanna Area Regional Airport Authority (SARAA)
- Saraa Barhoum, main figure of the Palestinian children's TV program Tomorrow's Pioneers

== See also ==
- Sara (disambiguation)
- Sarah (disambiguation)
