= Sverok =

Swedish gaming clubs umbrella organization

- Sveriges Roll och Konfliktspelsförbund
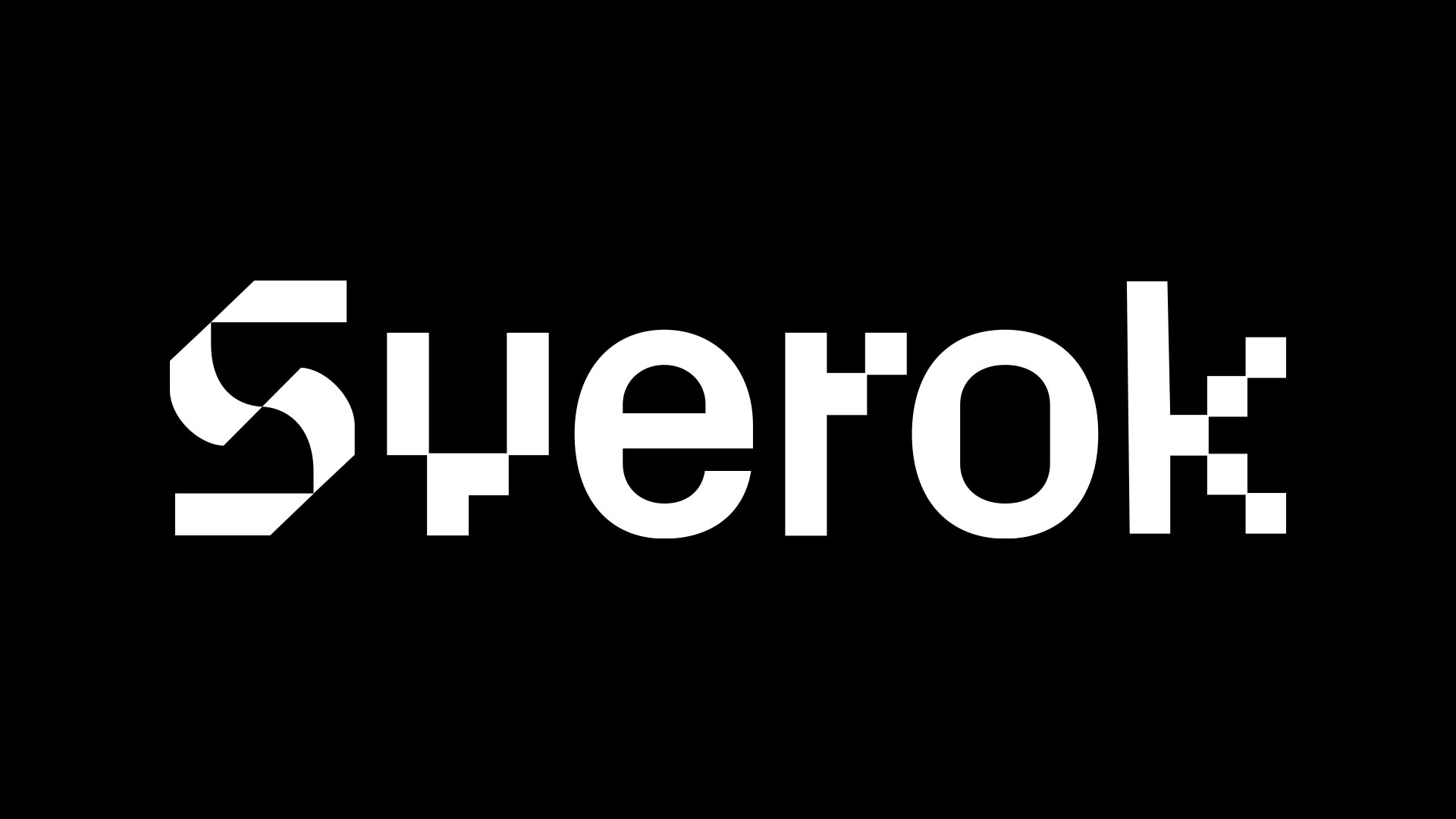

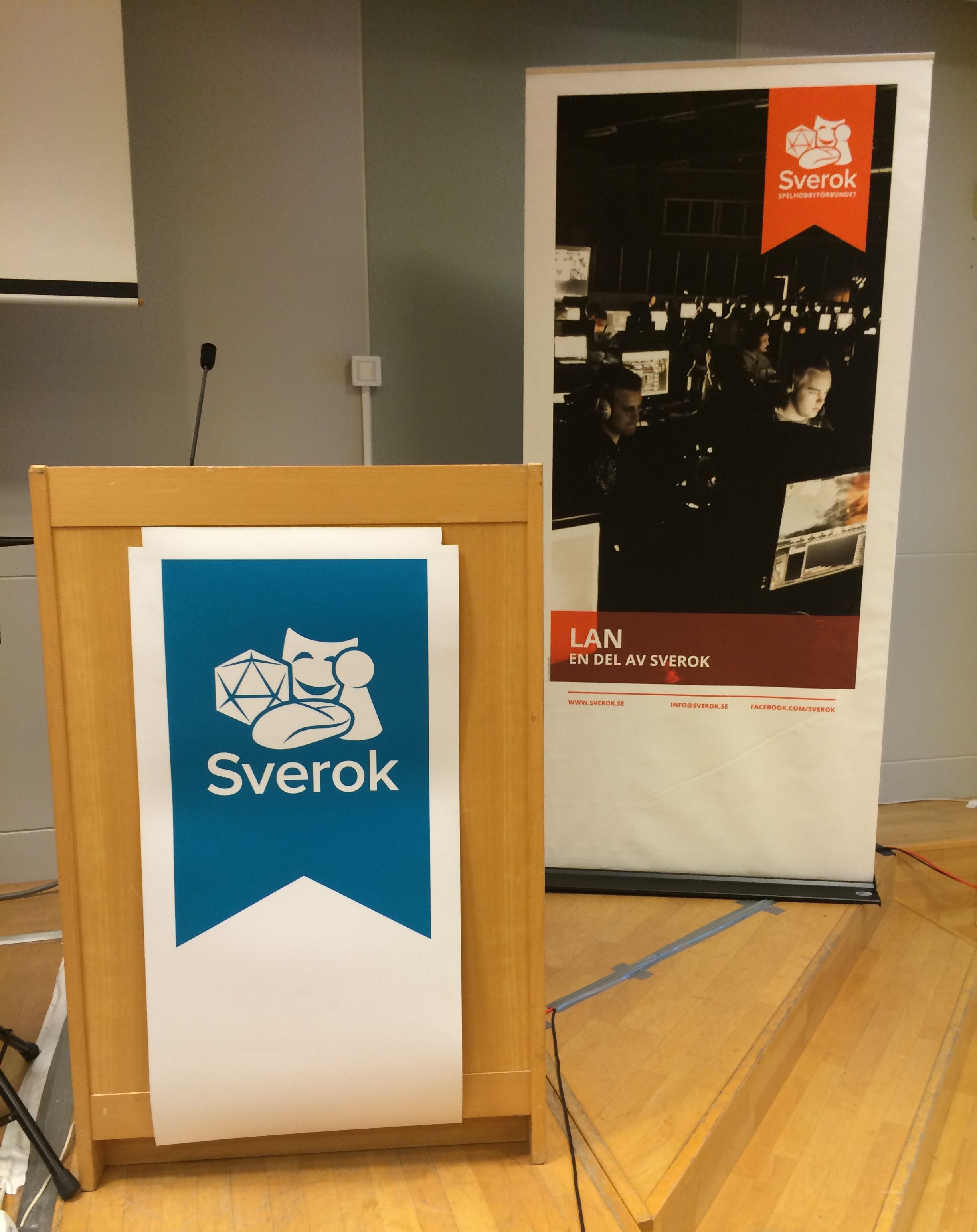
- Pronunciation: /sveːˈrɔk/
- Formation: December 4, 1988; 37 years ago
- Type: Umbrella organization
- Purpose: Organisation between Gaming Associations in Sweden
- Headquarters: Gustavlundsvägen 141, Bromma, Stockholm
- Location: Stockholm, Sweden
- Members: 40 000 (2025)
- Official language: Swedish, English
- Secretary General: Sara Hauge
- Förbundsordförande: Max Horttanainen
- Board of directors: David Eriksson; Henrik Almén; Evelina Ferbrache; Clara Herrlin; Rebecka Winter; Morris Ferneskog
- Main organ: Förbundsstyrelsen
- Budget: 17.6 m SEK (2023)
- Website: https://sverok.se/

Sverok – Spelkulturförbundet (The Swedish Gaming Federation) is a Swedish nationwide umbrella organization for gaming clubs. Sverok brings together the Swedish gaming hobby and, with 40,000 members in 1000 affiliated organisations, is one of the country's largest youth associations. Board games, miniature wargaming, collector's card games, role-playing games, e-sport, LAN, video games, airsoft, Asian popular culture, live action role-playing games (LARP), laser tag, paintball and fantasy are the main hobby branches. The organisation was founded in 1988 under the name Sveriges roll- och konfliktspelsförbund (Sverok) but has since adopted the abbreviation as its sole name because the organisation now encompasses many more branches of activity than when it was founded. Sverok has grown since then, both in terms of membership and the breadth of its activities. The Swedish Agency for Youth and Civil Society (MUCF) classifies Sverok as a youth organisation, as 92% of the organisation's members are young people aged 7–25. Sverok is a member organisation of Studiefrämjandet.

== Organisation ==
Sverok consists of 1000 independent member associations, which together have about 40,000 members. The organisation is governed by a board, which within Sverok is called the Federal Board (Förbundsstyrelsen) and is usually abbreviated to FS. In addition, Sverok has an administrative office in Linköping and Stockholm with about 20 employees who handle finances and association administration. Sverok also remunerates its förbundsordförande and general secretary on a full-time basis. There are also a number of working groups that work on a voluntary basis on behalf of the federal board. Sverok is organized in a democratic fashion. The member associations form the member base and all activity good and proper is performed by them. The districts and the national organization generally do not organize gaming events by themselves, rather opting to support local projects (the districts) or the clubs in general by means of funding, services and lobbying (the national organization), which makes it possible for some associations to organize bigger events such as gaming conventions, larps, LAN parties or other events related to their interest.

Member associations vary in size from five to tens of thousands. The vast majority of associations consist of between five and 50 people. The nature of the activities, and hence, associations, vary greatly, spanning both indoors and outdoors activities, with or without computers, with or without propping equipment. How a club is run is entirely up to the club as long as it's organized in a democratic fashion and is open for anyone to become a member and as democratic entities they are required to hold annual meetings within their own groups.

== Förbundsstyrelsen ==
Förbundsstyrelsen within Sverok, FS, consists of 5-10 members, a förbundsordförande, a secretary and a vice förbundsordförande. The latter three make up Sverok's executive committee, which has the task of implementing all the proposals that the national meeting assigns to FS. A member of the board has a specific area of responsibility. Examples of areas of responsibility: financial manager, district manager, association manager and personnel manager.

=== Riksmöte ===
Sverok's highest decision-making body is Sverok's annual meeting, which within the organisation is called the Riksmöte, abbreviated RM. Just over a hundred representatives of the associations attend the Riksmöte. At the assembly, the affiliated associations have direct decision-making power regarding the activities and focus of the national organisation, as well as who should be on the board.

According to Sverok's statutes, the board shall as previously stated have 5-10 members, a förbundsordförande, a secretary and a vice förbundsordförande. The RM decides on all positions except for the union secretary (förbundssekreterare), which the RM only recommends, mainly for practical reasons. The ability of the RM and the districts to influence the activities of their own organisation and the affiliated associations is largely limited as neither the federal board nor the districts have any voting rights.

The annual general meeting of the districts are fairly similar but on a regional level. Generally there's no nomination process – clubs are allowed to show up with a number of representatives with voting power (and traditionally, whoever else feels like showing up), the number based on their headcount.

=== Districts ===
Sverok is divided into twelve districts that cover the entire country. The geographical division of the districts is largely based on Sweden's county councils. The members of the districts are the Sverok-affiliated organisations that have their headquarters in the county councils that make up each district.

Sverok's districts have basically the same purpose as the federation but operate regionally. Since the districts have different conditions and the priorities differ between the districts, their activities can vary greatly between them. However, every year the districts must apply for money from the county council(s) they belong to.

Otherwise, typical activities of the districts are: contact brokers for the associations, attending conventions or other events in the district, arranging trips to events elsewhere in the country and abroad, or organising training courses for the associations. The districts have their own independent annual meetings, where representatives of the associations are present and directly decide who is to be included in the organisation's board and what activities are to be focused on; the national organisation has very limited power to decide what the districts should do, as these districts are highly autonomous and are governed primarily by RM and the district annual meeting.

==== List of districts ====
- Sverok Norrbotten, Norrbotten County, chairperson Christoffer Lundberg
- Sverok Västerbotten, Västerbotten County, chairperson Niklas Jonsson
- Sverok Nedre Norrland, Västernorrland and Jämtland County, chairperson Stefan Burström
- Sverok GävleDala, Dalarna and Gävleborgs County, chairperson Andreas Jonsson
- Sverok Svealand, Värmland and Örebro County, chairperson Alex Holmberg
- Sverok Mälardalen, Södermanland, Uppsala and Västmanland County, chairperson Adam Osbäck
- Sverok Stockholm-Gotland, Stockholm and Gotland County, chairperson Sam Schönbeck
- Sverok Östergötland, Östergötland County, chairperson Willy Ahlin
- Sverok Jönköping-Kronoberg, Jönköping and Kronoberg County, chairperson Carl Johan Sanglert
- Sverok Kalmar-Blekinge, Kalmar and Blekinge County, chairperson Kim Bergenholtz
- Sverok Väst, Västra Götaland and Halland County, chairperson Matilda Karlström
- Sverok Skåne, Skåne County, chairperson Alexander Wallin

== Funding and economy of Sverok ==
Any sufficiently large – 3000 members or more – youth organization organized in a democratic manner is eligible to receive government funding to cover operating expenses. Historically (pre 2001) this has been calculated from the amount of activity generated in the member clubs. Since 2001 it is instead based on the number of member clubs and the headcount they represent.

All in all 106 organizations receive this governmental support - this includes both party political organizations, local branches of international organizations such as Red Cross youth organization and the Scouts, disabilities youth organizations and more hobby related organizations such as Sverok. Notably, it does not include sport organizations.

The 2015 governmental support was approximately 10 000 000 SEK. Half of this sum is used to cover administration costs, basic democratic functions, insurances for members while engaging in their hobby and so forth. The remainder – a stated target has traditionally been at least 50% – is paid directly to the member clubs, the sums varying in size according to the number of members.

The districts of Sverok receive funding directly from their respective counties and is not included in the above tally (although there are exceptions). The amount of support received and reasons for receiving it varies from county to county. The densely populated ones have well over €50 000 (Stockholm over €100 000) while the more rural areas tend to hand out less funding. This funding cover administration, basic democratic functions and support to local clubs in ways appropriate for the region.

How the money is spent differs greatly. Members in some (often rather densely populated) parts of the country prefer staffed offices. Other districts are spread out in such a fashion that it's nearly impossible to keep a central office; hence their organization is a lot more virtual by nature. Apart from rent and salaries, common ways to spend the money include subsidized trips to big gaming events, monetary support for local events and cheap-or-free storage or rental of equipment, among other things. Due to the very nature of this arrangement, things have a tendency to come and go —some years a particular district finds it fit to print a member magazine, other years not.

== History and pre-history of Sverok ==
Sweden has a long history when it comes to gaming and role-playing. In 1972, the oldest member organization in Sverok was founded: Forodrim, in Stockholm. In 1976, GothCon (the oldest still-active gaming convention in the world) took place for the first time. Gamers in Gothenburg gathered over Easter to play games and generally congregate. Another notable convention is LinCon.

In 1982, the first Swedish RPG was published: Drakar och Demoner, based on Basic Role Playing. The title translates to "Dragons and Demons", and in Sweden, it has the same status and recognition as "Dungeons & Dragons" has in English-speaking countries. During the 1980s, the role-playing and board gaming hobby grew to larger proportions. Several new gaming conventions popped up in various parts of the country, some of which are still active. Numerous gaming clubs were formed as well. In Sweden, most counties give support to youth clubs of a decent size. By uniting the local gamers, many clubs got free or cheap places to keep their equipment and play their games.

Sverok was founded in late 1988 to act as an umbrella organization for the various gaming clubs. During the early years numerous existing gaming clubs joined Sverok and a push by the organization was also made to generate new clubs – by informing youths about how to go about it. Since forming a club and joining Sverok meant receiving funds (rather than paying a membership fee) many teenagers saw it as a good way of getting some gaming supplements essentially for free. The only real requirements were – and are – that the clubs need to be open for members and organized in a democratic fashion. From a governmental perspective, this ensures that a large number of people are involved in a democratic process early on in life. During these early years much of the organizing of the federation itself was done on a volunteer basis.

Another important reason for gamers to unite was strength in numbers. What was previously seen as a niche phenomena turned more and more mainstream as the organization gained members. This proved useful in the mid-1990s when claims about role-playing being detrimental to the mental health of youth and links to satanism gained a fair amount of media attention, calling for a ban on tabletop role-playing games or at the very least cut funding for Sverok. Already having gained a large following, Sverok was able to stand as a counterpart to these claims in TV debates and newspaper opinion pages.

By 1997, Sverok had a member base of over 20 000. It eventually declined somewhat to about 16 000 in 2001 (a nationwide slump in youth organization membership in general) when another push for more exposure and encouraging members to form new clubs was coordinated alongside a crucial change in the basis for government support money carried the official headcount over 100 000 in 2005. Today (as of December 2014) Sverok have approximately 80 000 members in 1200 clubs. 16 people are currently working in administration and special projects such as NAB (Norms, attitudes and behaviours) and Respect All, Compete (for a more welcoming climate in e-sports).

== Members ==
=== Förbundsordförande of Sverok through the ages ===
- Fredrik Innings 1988-1994
- Jonas Birgersson 1994-1996
- Wiktor Södersten 1996-1997
- Eliot Wieslander 1997-1999
- Karl Nissfelt 1999-2001
- Hanna Jonsson 2001-2003
- Jon Nilsson 2003-2005
- Petra Malmgren 2005-2007
- Aimée Kreuger 2007-2008
- David Gustavsson 2009-2011
- Rebecka Prentell 2012-2014
- Alexander Hallberg 2015-2017
- Anna Erlandsson 2018
- Alexandra Hjortswang 2019-2020
- Max Horttanainen 2021-2023
- Evelina "Maro" Ferbrache 2024-

=== Vice Förbundsordförande of Sverok through the ages ===
- Nina Högberg 2009
- Peter Sahlin 2010
- Johan Groth 2011
- Tobias Landén 2012
- Alexander Hallberg 2013-2014
- Linnea Risinger 2015
- Cecilia Hällstrand 2016-2017
- Evelina Ferbrache 2018
- Max Horttanainen 2019-2020
- Helena Sandahl 2021-
