= Sara Moura =

Portuguese actress and producer (born 1988)

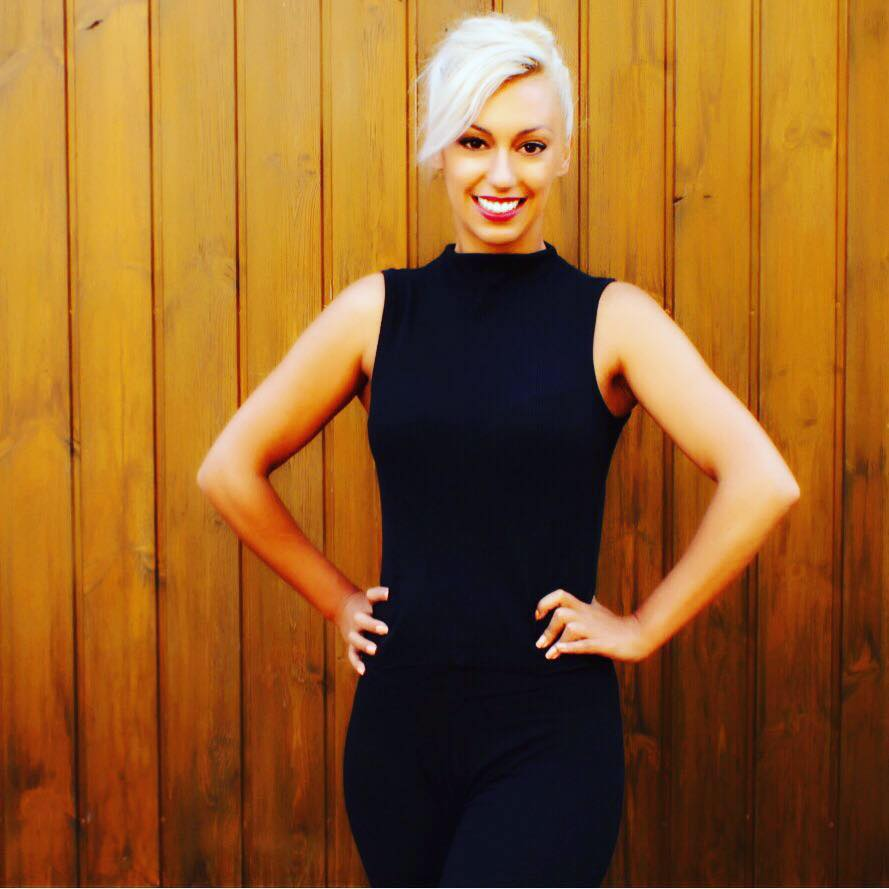
- Sara Moura
- Born: Sara Botelho de Carvalho da Cruz Moura; October 3, 1988 (age 38); Lisbon, Lisbon, Portugal
- Occupation: Actress

Sara Botelho de Carvalho da Cruz Moura (born 3 October 1988, Lisbon) is a Portuguese actress and producer.

== Studies ==
She began her artistic studies at EPAOE, Chapitô directed by Ávila Costa, Francisco Salgado, Rute Dutra, and others. She has various workshops such as voice and singing with Sara Belo, mime with Gardi Hutter, physical theatre with John Mowat and a masterclass on commedia dell'arte with Carlo Boso.

== Career ==
She interned with Jorge Listopad at Teatro de Municipal de Almada as an assistant director and actress. She works with Artistas Unidos since 2006 where she was directed by Jorge Silva Melo and Franzisca Aarflot. She worked with Bicateatro and Animoforma as a producer and entertainer. In 2009 she mada her film debut with the film António Lobo Antunes: Escrever, escrever, viver directed by Solveig Nordlund. Since 2012 Sara has been working as an actress and producer at Skookum Films where she develops many projects with filmmaker Nuno Sá Pessoa.

Sara performed as a DJ in various clubs and events as "Miss Sara".

In 2015 she protagonized the documentary short film Je Suis Sousa Mendes directed by Cloves Mendes. She is part of the film selection jury at Arroios Film Festival in Lisbon.

Sara has always been interested in writing and comedy. She is known for her love for comedy, she created the Make Comedy Offensive Again hat, which has gained worldwide recognition.

== Theatre ==
- Scissors, Paper, Rock, by Daniel Keene (2007)
- A Mata, by Jesper Halle (2007)
- Tonight We Improvise, by Luigi Pirandello (2009)
- Six Characters in Search of an Author, by Luigi Pirandello (2009)
- Fala da Criada, by Jorge Silva Melo (2011)
- Palace of the End, by Judith Thompson (2012)
- Escurial, by Michel de Ghelderode (2013)

== Film ==
- António Lobo Antunes: Escrever, escrever, viver, by Solveig Nordlund (2009)
- Bílis Negra, by Nuno Sá Pessoa (2013)
- O Mestre do Barro, by Nuno Sá Pessoa (2015)
- O Método, by Nuno Sá Pessoa (2015)
- Je Suis Sousa Mendes by Cloves Mendes (2015)
