= Botanic Gardens Conservation International =

Plant conservation charity

BGCI logo

Botanic Gardens Conservation International (BGCI) is a plant conservation charity based in Kew, Surrey, England. It is a membership organisation, working with 800 botanic gardens in 118 countries, whose combined work forms the world's largest plant conservation network.

Founded in 1987, BGCI is a registered charity in the United Kingdom, and its members include the Royal Botanic Gardens, Kew and the Royal Botanic Garden, Edinburgh, as two of its key supporters. The founder and director from 1987 to 1993 was Professor Vernon H Heywood. He was followed in 1994 by Dr. Peter Wyse Jackson (as Secretary-General) who led BGCI till 2005 when Sara Oldfield succeeded him. She was then followed by Paul Smith in 2016 (current acting Secretary-General of BGCI).

BGCI's patron is King Charles III. Lady Suzanne Warner was Chair of BGCI from December 1999 to December 2004. She received an OBE in the Queen's 2006 New Year's Honours for her services to plant conservation.

Dedicated to plant conservation and environmental education, the charity works to support and promote the activities of its member gardens. Its official stated mission is to "mobilise botanic gardens and engage partners in securing plant diversity for the well-being of people and the planet."

As a global organisation BGCI has projects in a variety of different countries, with major ongoing projects in China (where half of the wild magnolias are threatened), North America, the Middle East and Russia. Two of its major projects are the creation of on-line searchable databases listing the world's botanic gardens (Garden Search) and plants in cultivation among participating botanic gardens (Plant Search).

On 18 January 2008, Botanic Gardens Conservation International (representing botanic gardens in 120 countries) stated that "400 medicinal plants are at risk of extinction, from over-collection and deforestation, threatening the discovery of future cures for disease." These included yew trees (the bark is used for cancer drugs, paclitaxel); Hoodia gordonii (from Namibia, source of weight loss drugs); half of Magnolias (used as Chinese medicine for 5,000 years to fight cancer, dementia and heart disease); and Autumn crocus (for gout). The group also found that 5 billion people benefit from traditional plant-based medicine for health care.

In 2017 Botanic Gardens Conservation International published a list of 60,065 tree species worldwide obtained from information supplied by its member organisations. The aim of the project was to identify trees that are in danger of extinction and promote efforts to conserve these trees.

In 2021 BGCI published a landmark State of the World's Trees report. The report, compiling work led by the Global Tree Assessment (GTA), is the culmination of five years of research to identify major gaps in tree conservation efforts. It is one of the first assessments of the world's threatened trees. Examining the globe's 60,000 tree species, it reveals that 30% (17,500) of tree species are currently at risk of extinction. That means there are twice the number of threatened tree species globally than threatened mammals, birds, amphibians and reptiles combined. The State of the World's Trees report brings together research from over 60 institutional partners, including botanic gardens, forestry institutions and universities worldwide, as well as more than 500 experts who have contributed to tree assessments in the last five years.
