= Saria =

Saria may refer to:

- SARIA, a food company
- Saria, Burkina Faso
- Saria (mountain), an international mountain in the Anti-Lebanon mountain range
- Saria, a heroine protagonist of Twinkle Tale
- Saria (The Legend of Zelda), a fictional character
- Saria Island, an island of Greece
- Saria, an Oscar nominated short film based on the 2017 Guatemala orphanage fire events

== See also ==
- Sariya (community development block), Jharkhand, India
  - Suriya, Giridih, Jharkhand, India
- Sara (disambiguation)
- Sariah
- Sharia
