= Sarah Murphy =

Sarah Murphy may refer to:

- Sarah Murphy (biathlete) (born 1988), New Zealand biathlete
- Sarah Murphy (curler) (born 1986), Canadian curler
- Sarah Murphy (politician) (born 1986), British politician
- Sarah Murphy (swimmer) (born 1975), Zimbabwean swimmer

== See also ==
- Sara Murphy (disambiguation)
