= James Randy McGinnis =

- Born: James Randy McGinnis; July 9, 1957; Albuquerque, New Mexico, U.S.
- Died: December 14, 2019 (aged 62); Baltimore, Maryland, U.S.
- Education: University of Georgia
- Occupation: Professor of Science Education
- Known for: Climate change education
- Spouse: Greta Swanson
- Children: 3

James Randy McGinnis (July 9, 1957 – December 14, 2019) was a distinguished professor of science education at the University of Maryland, College Park, known for his work in climate change education, as well as his dedication to diversity and inclusion in the field. His service as the president of NARST, and editor of the Journal of Research in Science Teaching highlighted his national and international recognition as a leading scholar in science education.

== Early life and education ==
James Randy McGinnis was born in Albuquerque, New Mexico. Growing up as a military dependent, he lived in various locations, including Tennessee, Maryland, Germany, South Carolina, and Georgia. He graduated from Columbus High School in 1975 and pursued higher education at the University of Georgia, graduating with honors in 1980 with a major in geology and a minor in philosophy. Following this, he served in the Peace Corps in Swaziland, where he taught in a rural school and met his future wife, Greta Swanson.

After returning to the United States, McGinnis became one of the inaugural Peace Corps Fellows, joining Teachers College’s Peace Corps Fellows Program in 1985 and taught at DeWitt Clinton High School. He then pursued his Ph.D. in Science Education at the University of Georgia.

== Academic and professional career ==
McGinnis specialized in elementary education and was deeply involved in climate change education, securing l NSF grants for initiatives such as the Maryland and Delaware Climate Change Education, Assessment, and Research MADE CLEAR program.

McGinnis joined the College of Education at University of Maryland, College Park in 1993, where he researched and taught for more than 25 years. He was the founding Director of the Center for Science and Technology in Education within the university’s Department of Teaching and Learning, Policy and Leadership. He taught graduate and undergraduate courses in pedagogical principles, science teaching methods, theory and curriculum, advanced interpretive methodology, action research, and climate change education.

McGinnis received numerous awards throughout his career, including the Early Career Research Award in 1998, the Elevate Fellow for teaching in 2015, and recognition for Exceptional Scholarship in the College of Education in 2017. He served as the co-editor and later editor-in-chief of the Journal of Research in Science Teaching from 2005 to 2011 and was president of the National Association of Research in Science Teaching (NARST) from 2011 to 2012

McGinnis's work emphasized diversity and inclusion, collaborating with Historically Black Institutions and focusing on the recruitment and retention of underrepresented groups in science education.

== Personal life ==
McGinnis died on December 14, 2019, at the University of Maryland Medical Center in Baltimore. McGinnis and his wife, Greta, had three children.
