= Sara Alderman Murphy =

Sara Alderman Murphy (June 17, 1924 – April 15, 1995) was a civil rights activist living in Little Rock, Arkansas during the school integration attempts in the 1950s. She was born in Wartrace, Tennessee. She earned her BA in Social Studies and English from Vanderbilt University in 1945 and a MS in Journalism from Columbia University. She was a faculty member of Northwestern State University in Natchitoches, Louisiana and then at the University of Arkansas at Little Rock. Sara Murphy joined the Women’s Emergency Committee to Open Our Schools (WEC) after the attempt to integrate Little Rock’s Central High School in 1957. She was on the WEC board in 1962 and 1963. In 1963 she founded a branch of the Panel of American Women (PAW) in Little Rock and became vice-president of the national PAW from 1971 to 1974. From 1972-1975 she was the vice-chairperson of the Governor’s Commission on the Status of Women. In 1982 she founded Peace Links, an organization to ease international tensions through discussion and personal interactions. She was the president of Arkansas’ Peace Links from 1982-1984. She wrote Breaking the Silence, a book about the role of the WEC in the Little Rock integration crisis.
