= Sara Buijskes =

South African photographer (1886–1970)

Sara Helena Violet Buijskes (23 September 1886 – 9 December 1970) was a South African photographer, recognized as Johannesburg's first professional female photographer. She was known for her portraiture and received international recognition for her work.

== Early life and education ==
Sara Buijskes was born in Kimberley, South Africa, on 23 September 1886. She was the fourth of ten children born to Johannes Hendricus Brand Buijskes and Helena Josina Brink. The family later moved to Johannesburg. She completed her schooling at the Huguenot High School for Girls in Wellington.

== Career ==
Buijskes began her photographic career in 1906 as an assistant in the studio of Robinson Christian Engelstoft Nissen in Johannesburg. Initially working in the darkroom, she later became a photographer. In 1932, she opened her own studio in the Barbican Building, Johannesburg, where her sister Maud assisted her.

She became known for her portrait photography, capturing the essence of South African figures such as artist Erich Mayer, broadcaster Pieter de Waal, and Dr. Arthur Bensusan.

== Achievements and recognition ==
In 1935, Buijskes won her first international award in Bern, Switzerland. She became an Associate of the Royal Photographic Society (ARPS) in the same year. In 1958, she received the "Artiste – Fédération Internationale de l’Art Photographique" (AFIAP) title, acknowledging her contributions to photography.

Her work was also recognized in local publications such as Die Vaderland, Die Transvaler, and Dagbreek se vroue bylaag, which featured articles about her career.

== Legacy ==
Buijskes died on 9 December 1970 in Johannesburg. By the time of her death, she had dedicated 64 years to photography. Despite her international recognition, much of her work remained underappreciated in South Africa until a revival of interest in the 2020s. In 2025, an exhibition of her work was held at The Rand Club in Johannesburg.

Her photographs are archived at the South African National Archives in Pretoria. Additionally, the Bensusan Museum in South Africa acquired a collection of her work in 1971.

== Rediscovery ==
In 2023, a collection of Sara's work was discovered in an antique shop in Mossel Bay, South Africa. Nearly 200 large bromide photographs, hidden in a drawer, were identified as her work. This find, made by Michael de Nobrega, has shed new light on her contributions to South African photography.

The collection provides a rare glimpse into the early 20th century, showcasing Buijskes' mastery of composition, lighting, and storytelling. Her ability to capture the essence of her subjects reflects a vision that sets her apart in a male-dominated field. The discovery has sparked renewed interest in her legacy, ensuring that her contributions to photography are preserved and celebrated for future generations.

Below are some of the photographs discovered by Michael de Nobrega:

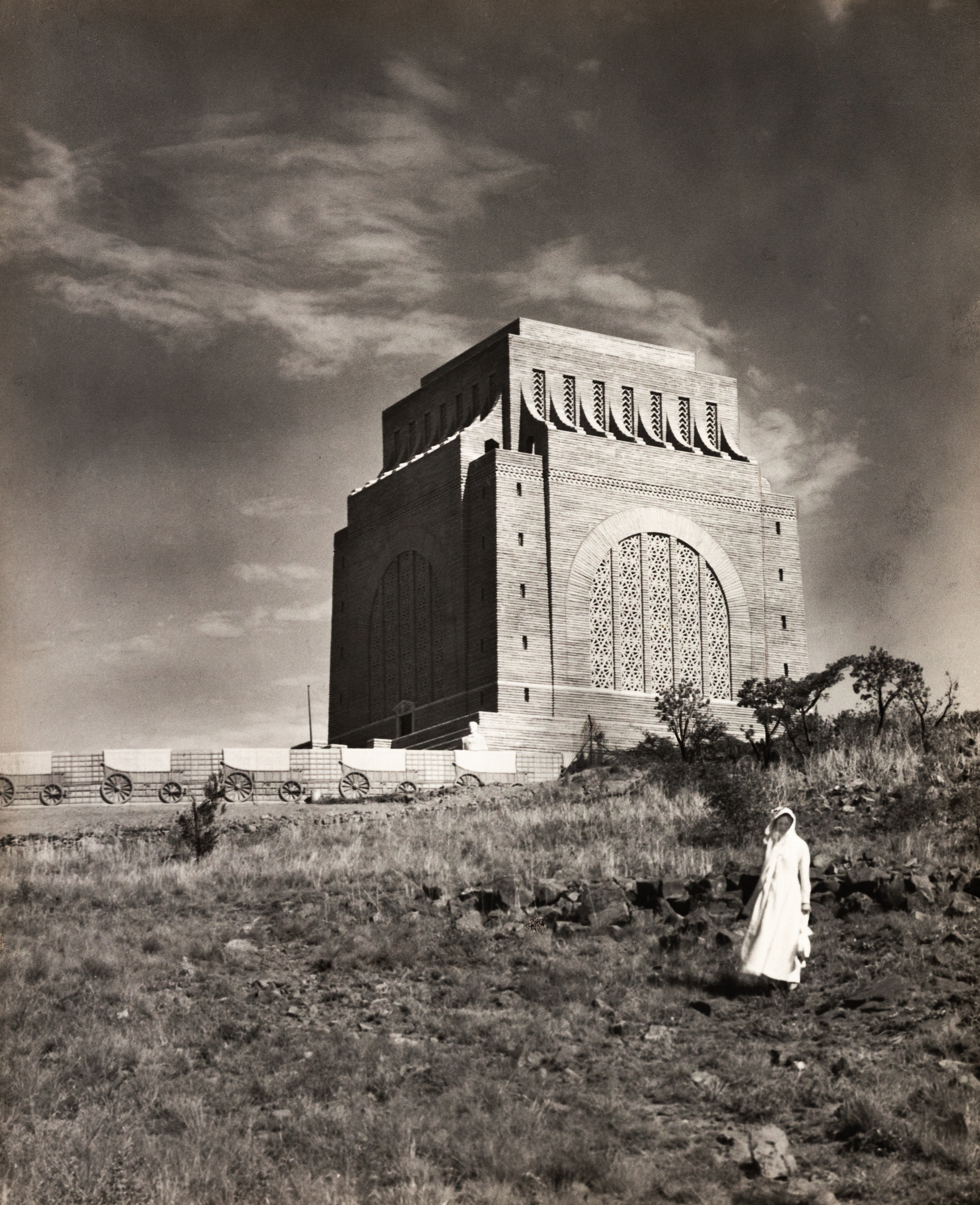
"Voortrekker Monument 1949"

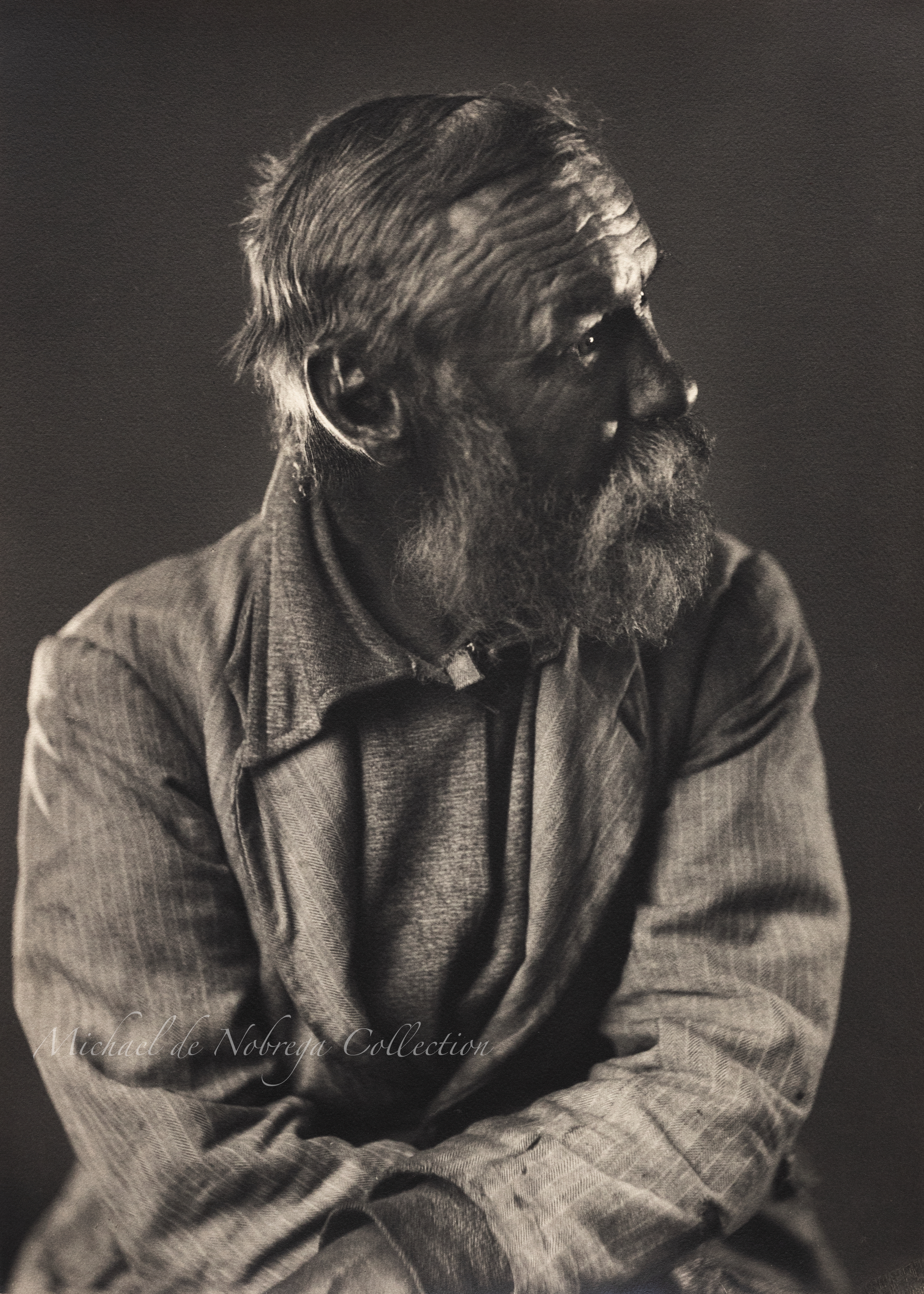
"Unconquered", awarded a bronze medal at the IV Internationale Kunstphotographische Ausstellung in Luzerne, Switzerland in 1935.

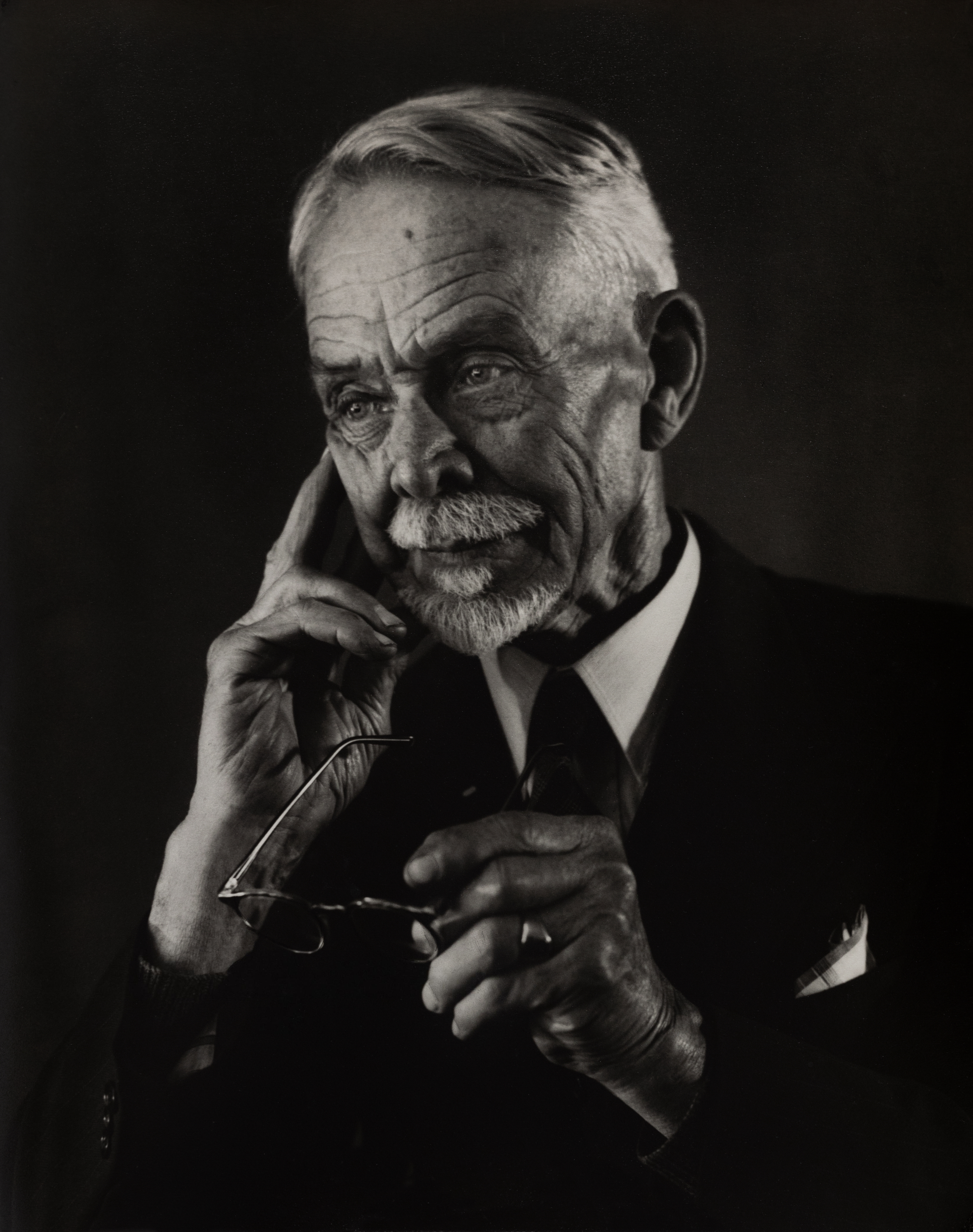
"Dr. M.C. Van Schoor"

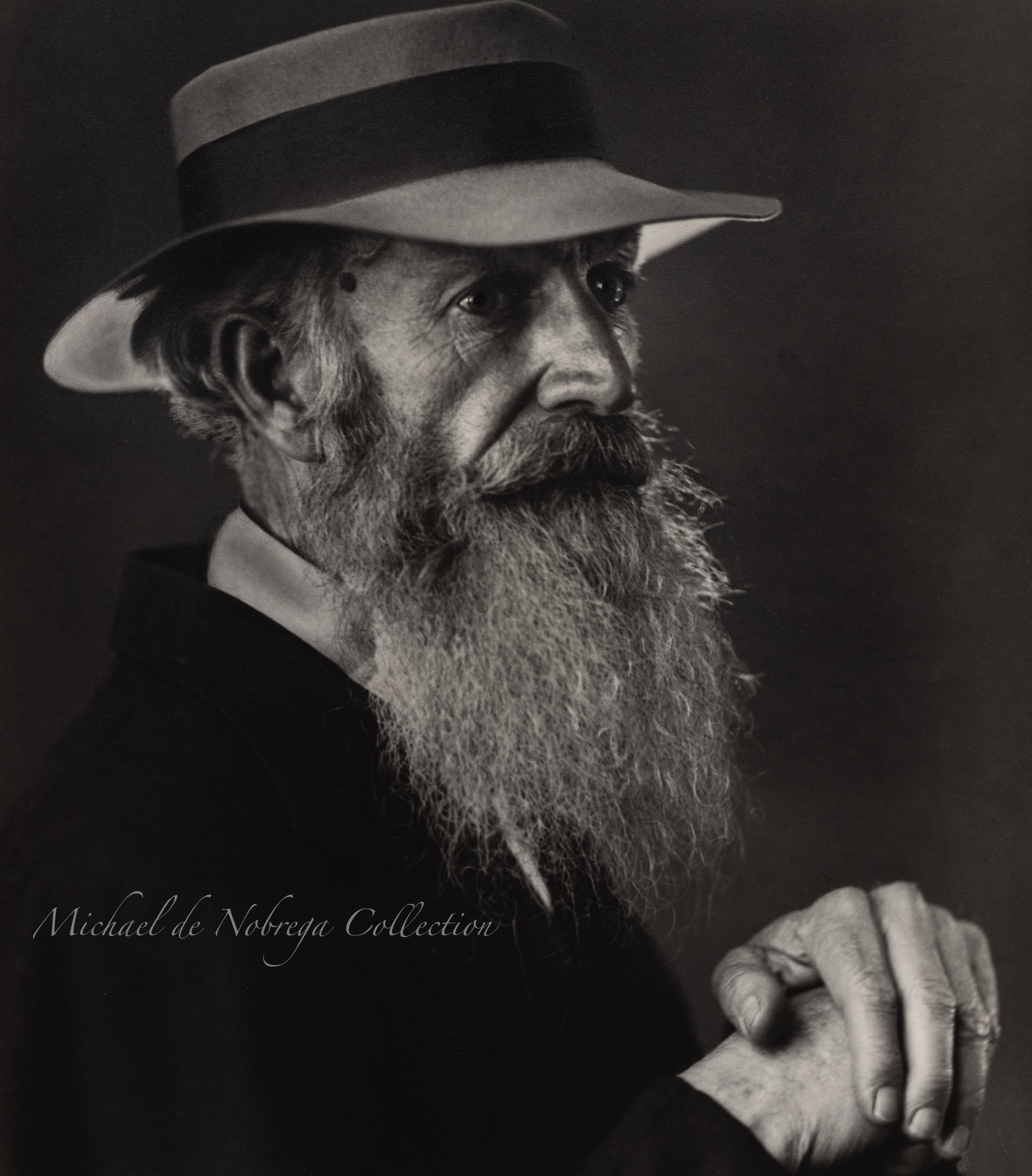
"Voortrekker"

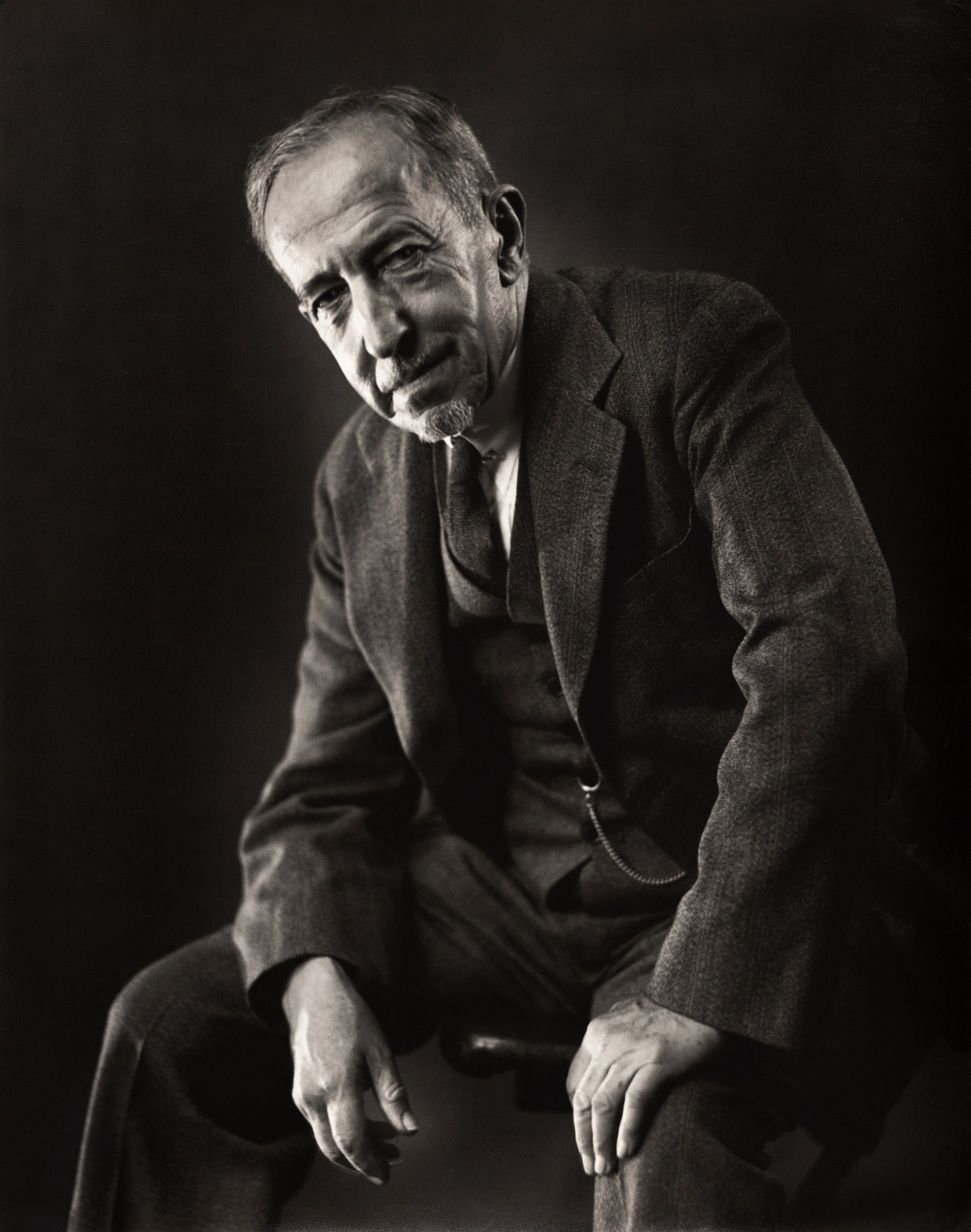
"Erich Mayer"
