= Sohrab, Iran =

Sohrab سهراب
- Village
- Location within Iran
- Coordinates: 30°02′33″N 55°10′13″E
- Country: Iran
- Province: Kerman
- County: Shahr-e Babak
- Bakhsh: Central
- Rural District: Estabraq

Population (2006)
  - Total: 515
- Time zone: UTC+3:30 (IRST)
  - Summer (DST): UTC+4:30 (IRDT)

Sohrab (Persian: سهراب, also Romanized as Sohrāb; also known as Sārā, Sārāb, Sārāb Sohrāb, Zadeh, and Zara‘) is a village in Estabraq Rural District, in the Central District of Shahr-e Babak County, Kerman province, Iran. At the 2006 census, its population was 515, in 121 families.
