= Nuno Sá Pessoa =

Portuguese film director, producer and cinematographer

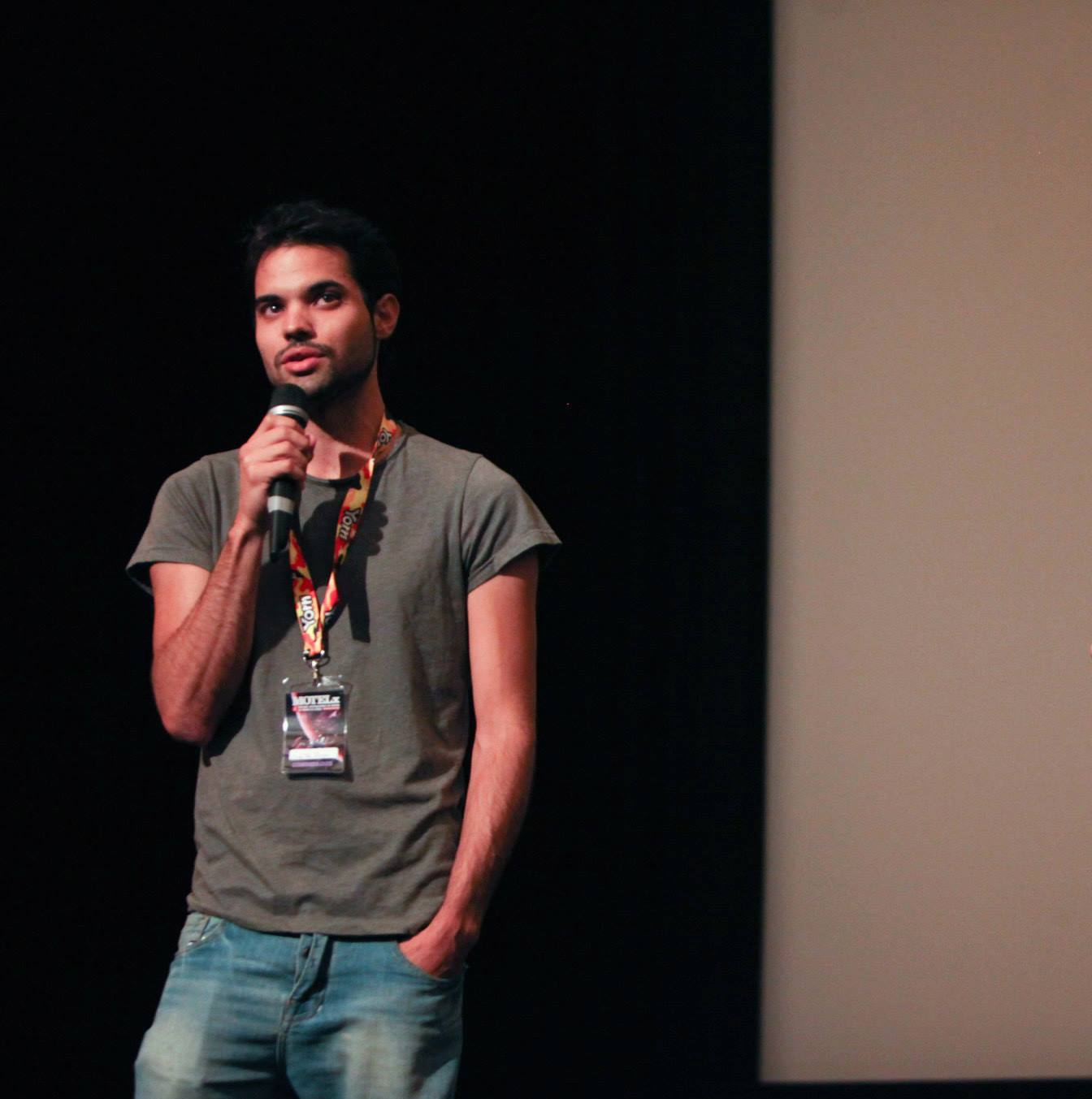
- Born: Nuno de Sá Pessoa Costa Sequeira; May 7, 1987 (age 38); Lisbon, Portugal
- Education: The European Film College
- Occupation: Filmmaker

Nuno de Sá Pessoa Costa Sequeira (born May 7, 1987) is a Portuguese film director, producer, screenwriter, cinematographer and editor.

== Studies ==
He began studying cinema at the Moderna University of Lisbon but soon left it and went to Denmark where he graduated in filmmaking at The European Film College.

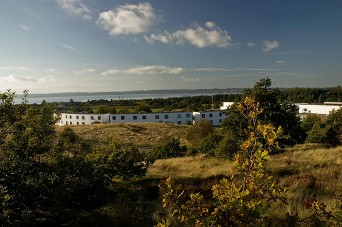
The European Film College

== Documentaries ==
He filmed and edited two documentaries about Portuguese historical wines, Mother Vine and Azores, from Lava to Wine, both directed by the Californian director Kenneth Payton and hosted by Portuguese enologist Virgílio Loureiro. The collaboration with Kenneth Payton was followed by the film Les Terroiristes du Languedoc. He also shot a documentary series about the Californian missions The California Mission Ride directed and produced by Gwyneth Horder-Payton.

== Music videos ==
He edited and directed the music video Tribal Baroque - Gipsy Dance performed by New York artists S. K. Thoth and Lila Angelique.

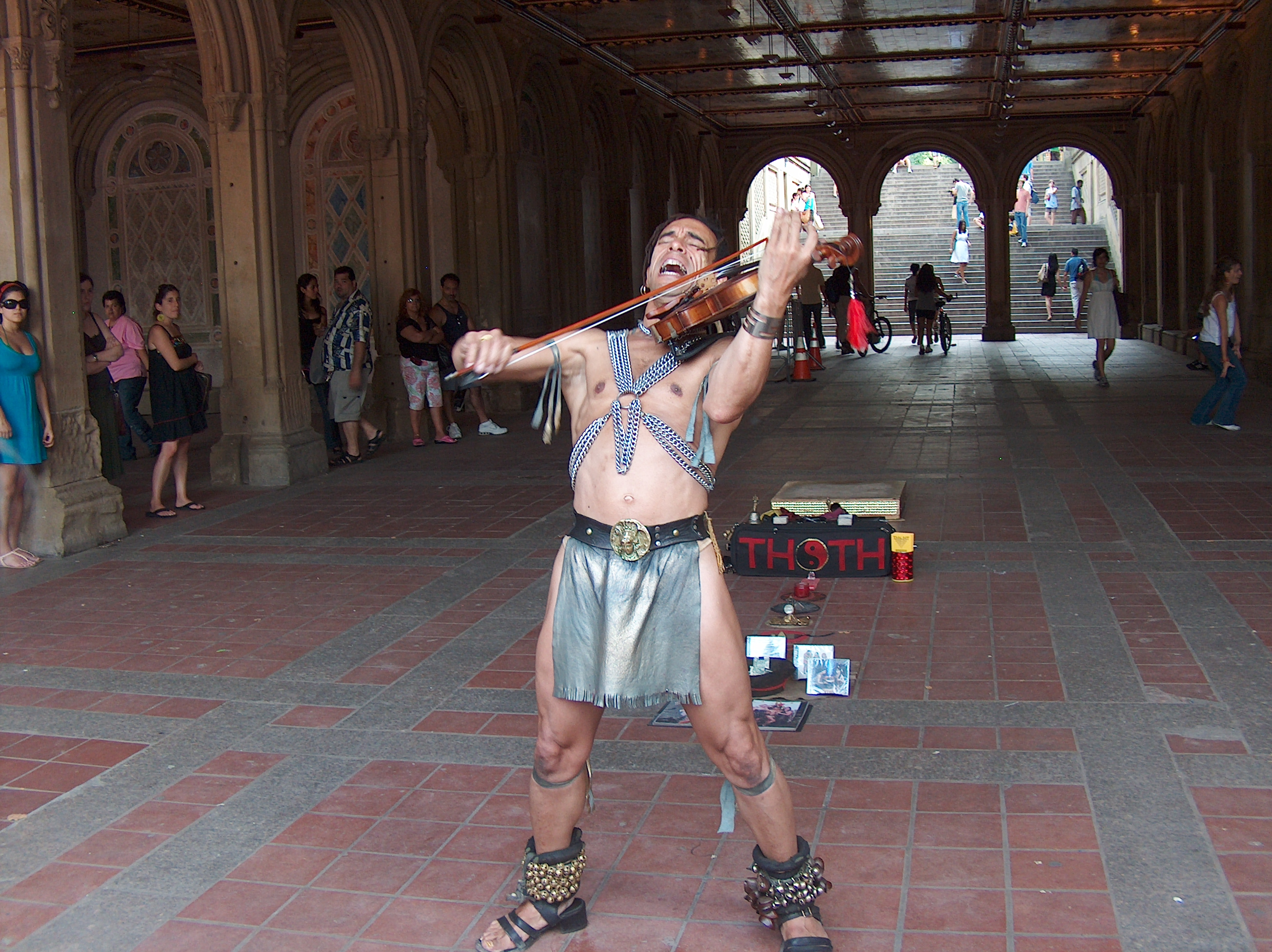
Thoth performing in Central Park, New York City in 2008

== Fiction ==
He directed his first short film The Headless Nun with two former colleagues, Kris Skovmand and Samuel Anderson, the film was made in memory of comedian George Carlin and it was narrated by his brother Patrick Carlin, it also features a song by Frank Zappa and an original soundtrack by Miguel Sá Pessoa and Laurent Filipe. The short film Dark Bile followed, starring João Craveiro, Tobias Monteiro and Paulo Duarte Ribeiro, the film was based on a theatre play by Brazilian author Uarlen Becker and was adapted by actor João Craveiro. He then moved to Florianópolis in order to work with Brazilian producer and filmmaker Maria Emília de Azevedo, there, he edited the film Passagens and he edited and directed the film The Lagoon. Upon finishing The Lagoon he went back to Portugal where he shot a science fiction short film which he wrote and directed, Earth 2084 starring Fernando Luís.

== Festivals and awards ==
Pessoa's films have been shown in more than 140 festivals spread throughout the world where they have been awarded in different categories, including best screenplay, best actor, best soundtrack and best short film of the year. He has also acted as jury for several film festivals, including FAM - Florianópolis Audiovisual Mercosul in Brazil and FESTin Lisboa in Portugal.

Since 2010 he has been the Portuguese Ambassador for The European Film College.

He has also been a guest lecturer at several events.

== Filmography as a Director ==
- Replicants (2009)
- The Eagle Flies to Portugal (2011)
- Tribal Baroque - Gipsy Dance (2012)
- The Headless Nun (2012)
- Gil do Carmo - A Menina do Calção Branco (2012)
- Dark Bile (2013)
- The Lagoon (2013)
- Earth 2084 (2014)
- O Mestre do Barro (2015)
- The Method (2015)
- The League of Explordinaires (2019)
