= Sareh =

Sareh (/Sar-eh/, ساره) is a Persian feminine given name. Notable people with the name include:

- Sareh Bayat (born 1979), Iranian actress, television host and model
- Sareh Javanmardi (born 1984), Iranian Paralympic shooter
- Sareh Mansouri (born Zahra Seddiqi Hamedani in 1991), Iranian LGBTQ activist currently on death row
- Sareh Nouri (born 1979), Persian-American fashion designer known for couture wedding gowns and bridal sashes
