= Sarah Lewis (writer) =

19th-century British writer

Sarah Lewis (fl. 1839–1848) was a 19th-century writer known for her work Woman's Mission, published anonymously in London in 1839. This work advocated for the 'separate spheres' ideology, emphasising the moral influence of Christian mothers within the domestic sphere, which she believed could counter male dominance. Lewis argued against extending women's roles into the public sphere, aligning with contemporaries like Sarah Stickney Ellis. Woman's Mission received praise from George Eliot and was based on Louis Aimé Martin's 1834 work De l'éducation des mères de famille, ou la civilisation du genre humain par les femmes.
