= Sara Sosnowy =

American artist (born 1957)

Sara Sosnowy (born 1957 in Texas City, Texas) is an American contemporary artist. Her paintings, drawings and prints have been collected by the Museum of Modern Art, the National Gallery of Art and the Yale University Art Gallery, among others.

== Education and career ==
Sosnowy received a MFA from Pratt Institute (1989), and a BFA from Stephen F. Austin State University.

Over the course of her career, Sasnowy has created works that explore strategies of representation and abstraction, and range in scale and medium. While certain works are quiet minimalist color studies, others are dense maximalist patternings. Sosnowy draws from a wide pool of source imagery that ranges from Old Master works to flora to folded newspapers to reams of ribbon. Repetition of forms and materials are a common process in Sasnowy's practice, whether it is a black sheet of paper embedded with rows of string and painted with lush patterns of gold dots, or a mural-sized circles-within-circles mandala formed from dozens of smaller paintings.

Sosnowy has had solo exhibitions at Lesley Heller Gallery, New York, NY; Zolla/Lieberman Gallery, Chicago, IL; John Weber Gallery, New York, NY; Barbara Davis Gallery, Houston, TX; the Museum of East Texas, Lufkin, TX; and SFA Gallery, Stephen F. Austin State University, Nacogdoches, TX.

Her work has been included in group exhibition nationally and internationally in venues such as the Katonah Museum of Art, Katonah, NY; Fogg Art Museum, Harvard Art Museums, Cambridge, MA; The Drawing Center, New York, NY; the Museum of Modern Art, New York, NY; Centre of Culture and Fine Art, Hafnarfjordur, Iceland; and the Museo de Arte Contemporaneo Esteban Vicente, Segovia, Spain.

In 1999 Sosnowy received a Fifth Floor Foundation Grant (New York, NY) and in 1996 she received a Mid Atlantic Arts Foundation Fellowship (Baltimore, MD).

== Public collections ==
- Museum of Modern Art, New York, NY
- National Gallery of Art, Washington D.C.
- Fogg Art Museum, Harvard Art Museums, Cambridge, MA
- Yale University Art Gallery, New Haven, CT
- Davis Museum at Wellesley College, Wellesley, MA
- Hood Museum of Art, Dartmouth College, Hanover, NH
- Zimmerli Art Museum at Rutgers University, New Brunswick, NJ
- Hammer Museum, Los Angeles, CA
- Museum of Fine Arts, Houston, TX
- Arkansas Arts Center, Little Rock, AR
- Delaware Art Museum, Wilmington, DE
- Colby College Museum of Art, Waterville, ME
- Boise Art Museum, Boise, ID
- New Mexico Museum of Art, Santa Fe, NM
- University of Richmond Museum, University of Richmond, VA
- The New School, New York, NY
