= Sara T. Brand =

American business executive

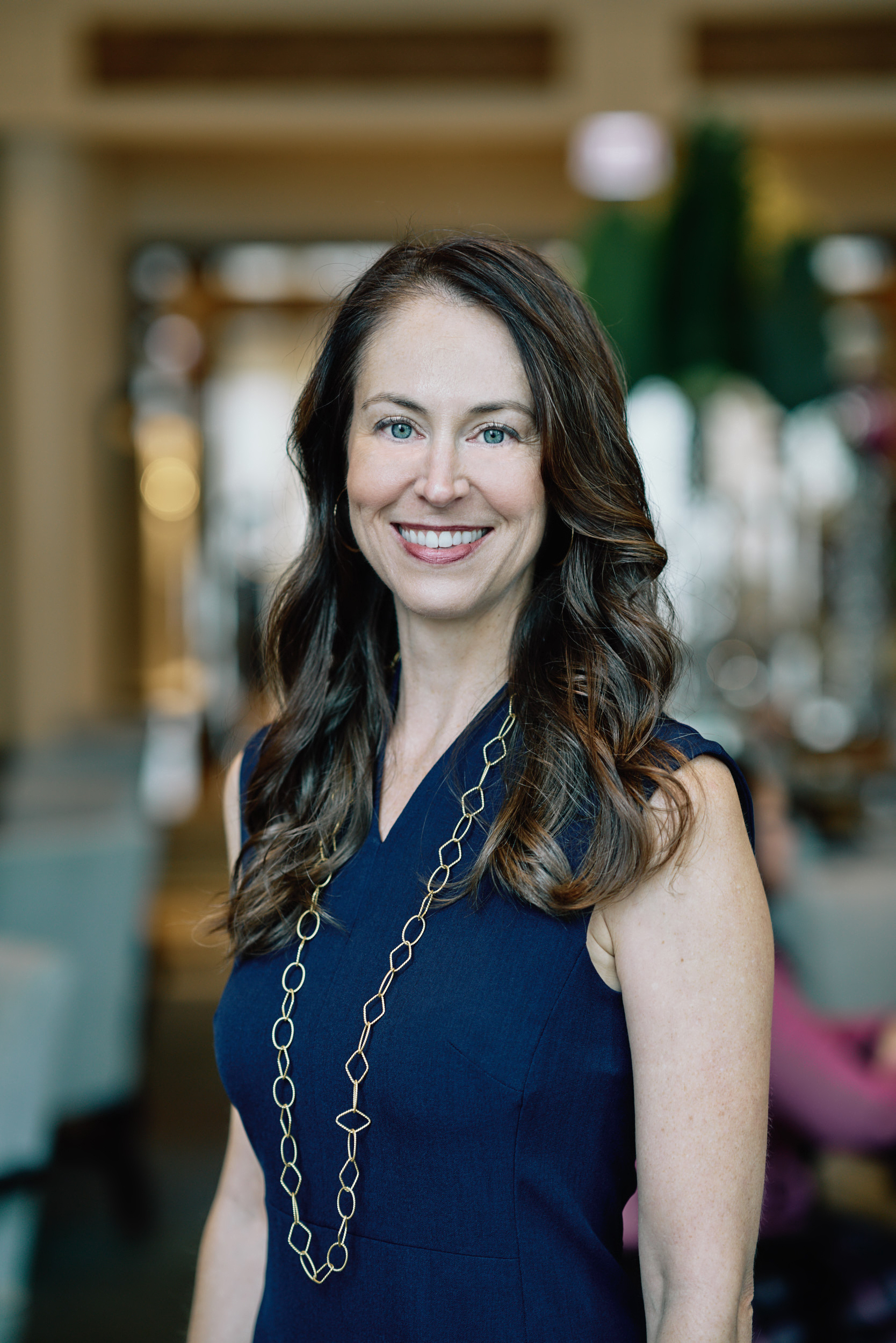
- Education: University of Texas at Austin; University of California at Berkeley
- Occupation: Businesswoman
- Organization(s): True Wealth Ventures (512) Brewing Company
- Spouse: Kevin Brand

Sara Thurwachter Brand is an American business executive. She is the founder of True Wealth Ventures and co-founder of (512) Brewing Company.

== Early life and education ==
Brand grew up in Wisconsin and Arizona. She earned a bachelor's degree in mechanical engineering from the University of Texas at Austin in 1996. Later, she enrolled at the University of California at Berkeley and completed a master's degree in mechanical engineering and a Management of Technology certificate from the Haas School of Business in 1998. She earned a Ph.D. in mechanical engineering from UC Berkeley in 2000.

== Career ==
Before entering venture capital, Brand worked as a semiconductor researcher in several companies including Intel and Applied Materials, and as a strategic management consultant at McKinsey & Company. She later worked at Fremont Ventures in San Francisco before joining AMD, where she remained more than a decade until 2015. At AMD, she led the integration of the company's acquisition of ATI Technologies in 2006 and reported to three of the company's four CEOs during her tenure.

In 2008, she and her husband, Kevin Brand, co-founded (512) Brewing Company.

In 2015, Brand founded True Wealth Ventures, a venture capital firm focused on women-led companies improving human and environmental health, and serves as its founding general partner. The firm's investment focus is explicitly on women-led companies improving human and environmental health. In January 2018, the firm closed its first fund at $19.1 million, making True Wealth Ventures Fund I the largest traditional venture capital fund at the time with an explicit gender-diversity investment strategy; approximately 80 percent of its investors were women. In June 2022, the firm announced the closing of their oversubscribed $35M Fund II, again backed by 80 percent women limited partners.
