= Sara Nathan =

Sara Nathan may refer to:

- Sara Nathan (broadcaster) (born 1956), British broadcaster
- Sara Nathan (journalist) (born 1977), British journalist and television editor of The Sun
