= Sara Riaz =

Pakistani chef

Sara Riaz (died: April 2014, Karachi) was a celebrity chef from Pakistan. She was associated with the Pakistani television network ARY Digital. She died of breast cancer.

== Career ==
Sara had more than 20 years of cooking experience. She was specifically associated with the cooking channel of ARY Digital named ARY Zauq. She was well known nationally as well as internationally. She regularly hosted a morning cooking show 'Khana Pakana' in ARY Zauq fives days a week. She made regular appearances in morning shows to advise on cooking recipes and health and nutrition. Her unique selling point was her easy to follow cooking instructions. She was also the owner of a professional recipes cooking training center in Karachi, Pakistan. Her recipes are hosted numerous websites on the internet.

== Death ==
Riaz died in April 2014 after contracting breast cancer. She left behind a husband and no children.
