= Sarah Lee =

Sara Lee or Sarah Lee may refer to:

- Sarah Bowdich Lee (1791–1856), English writer and naturalist
- Sarah Lee (reporter) (born 1971), Korean American reporter for CNN
- Sarah Lee (golfer) (born 1979), South Korean professional golfer
- Sarah Tomerlin Lee, magazine editor and interior designer
- Sarah Lee (cyclist) (born 1987), Hong Kong professional racing cyclist
- Sara Lee (wrestler) (1992–2022), American professional wrestler
- Sara Lee (musician), English bassist and singer-songwriter
- Sarah Lee (actress), winner of the Hong Kong Film Award for Best Supporting Actress for School on Fire
- Sara Lee Corporation, an American consumer-goods company that split its corporation into two
- "Sarah Lee," a song by Foghat from their self-titled debut album
