= Sara Berman =

Sara Berman may refer to:

- Sara Berman (philanthropist), American philanthropist and journalist
- Sara Berman (fashion designer) (born 1976), British artist and fashion designer
- Sara Mae Berman (born 1936), American marathon runner
- Sarah Berman (artist) (1895–1957)

== See also ==
- Berman (surname)
