= Sara Lane =

Sara or Sarah Lane may refer to:

== People ==
- Sara Malakul Lane, Thai-American actress and model
- Sarah Lane (born 1984), American ballet dancer
- Sarah Lane (theatre manager) (c. 1822 – 1899), British actress, playwright and theatre manager
- Sarah Lane, host on Daily Tech News Show and former host on TWiT.tv and Revision3 podcasts and G4's Attack of the Show
- Sara Lane (actress) (1949–2023), American actress

== Fictional characters ==
- Sara Lane, character in The Edge of Night
- Sara Lane, character in I Kissed a Vampire
