= Janis Sarra =

Canadian lawyer

Janis P. Sarra is a Canadian lawyer, currently the UBC Distinguished Professor of Law and founding Director of the Director of the National Centre for Business Law at the Peter A. Allard School of Law, University of British Columbia (UBC), and also a published author. She was previously the UBC's Director of the Peter Wall Institute for Advanced Studies, the university's Senator from 2003 to 2008, and also, until 2007, the Allard School of Law's Associate Dean.
