= Nərimanabad, Lankaran =

Village and municipality in Lankaran Rayon, Azerbaijan

Nərimanabad
- Municipality
- Location within Azerbaijan
- Coordinates: 38°52′04″N 48°50′53″E
- Country: Azerbaijan
- Rayon: Lankaran

Population (2008)
  - Total: 4,876
- Time zone: UTC+4 (AZT)
  - Summer (DST): UTC+5 (AZT)

Nərimanabad (also, Narimanov, Sara, and Sara-Ostrov) is a village and municipality in the Lankaran Rayon of Azerbaijan. It has a population of 4,876. The municipality consists of the villages of Nərimanabad and Üzümçülük.
