= Sara Renda =

Italian ballet dancer

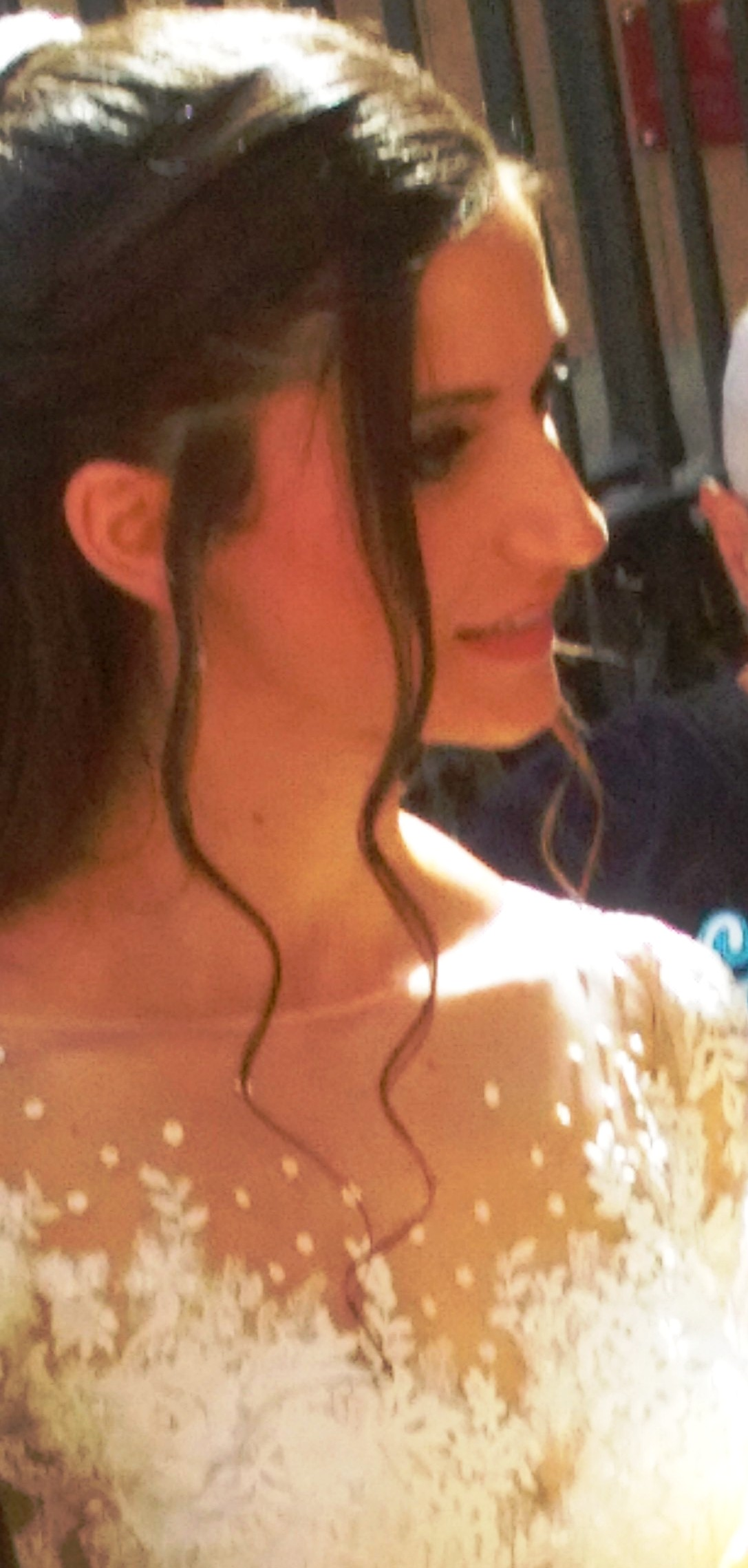
- Born: Sara Renda; 12 February 1991 (age 35); Alcamo, Sicily
- Occupation: ballet dancer
- Years active: 2010 – present
- Employer: Opéra National de Bordeaux
- Spouse: Riccardo Sardonè

Sara Renda is an Italian classic ballet dancer, on 15 December 2015 nominated Étoile at the Opéra National de Bordeaux, one of the youngest dancers to receive this recognition.

== Biography ==
Renda is a native of Alcamo, in the province of Trapani, where she spent her first years. Her mother is a teacher of physical education, a former champion of skating, and her father works for the Ministry of Justice. When she was three years old, her mother enrolled her at the school dance of Annamaria Campanelli, then she attended Teatro Massimo of Palermo, where she was a member of the section "Little dancers". Later, thanks to Marco Pierin, who was taking part in the jury of a contest, she successfully auditioned at the age of 11 and entered the Academy of la Scala in Milan. She graduated with honors, but, as she was not chosen for its ballet, in 2010 she moved to France.

=== Career ===
In September 2010 she signed a contract with the Opéra of Bordeaux, four years later, in December 2014, she was appointed prima ballerina, and only one year later, at the young age of 24, she was nominated Étoile by Charles Jude, the director of the company, and Thierry Fouchet, the director of the theatre.

=== Prizes and recognitions ===
- July 2014: bronze medal al the prestigious Varna International Ballet Competition: the first Italian dancer who received a medal, in the 50 years of the existence of this contest. In the female section, the jury, under the presidency of Vladimir Vassiliev, assigned only two silver medals and two bronze ones, no gold medals.
- 10 January 2015: a commendation plaque, given by the Lord Mayor of Alcamo, doctor Sebastiano Bonventre
- 2015: winner of the Danza&Danza prize, as the best Italian Dancer abroad
- 2015: Prize DanzArenzano Arte 2015
- 15 December 2015: nominated Étoile at the Opéra National de Bordeaux

=== Performances ===
As a prima ballerina she has danced in these main roles:

- Roméo et Juliette
- Giselle (2011 e 2012)
- Variation de l’Acte III dans Paquita (Dans les pas de Petipa, June 2012)
- Casse-Noisette by Charles Jude (December 2014)
- Tétris created by A.Egéa
- Don Quixote
- The Nutcracker and the Sleeping Beauty by Charles Jude (December 2012)
- Strawinsky Violin Concerto
- Les Quatre Tempéraments by G. Balanchine
- Carmina Burana et Chopin Número Uno by Mauricio Wainrot
- Un Américain à Paris et Rhapsody in Blue by McNeely
- Who Cares? by George Balanchine
- Il est de certains coeurs by Itzik Galili
- Parfois une hirondelle, created by C. Brumachon
- Coppélia (June 2013)
- Symphonie en trois mouvements, created by R. Wherlock (October 2013)
- Tam-tam et percussion by F. Blaska,
- Cupidon dans Don Quichotte by Charles Jude (2014)
- Pneuma di Carolyn Carlson, March 2014
- Suite en blanc di Serge Lifar (October 2014)
- Marie in Casse-Noisette (December 2014)
- If to Leave is to Remember by Carolyn Carlson (4 Tendances, 5 March 2015)
- Pas de trois et danse espagnole:Le Lac des cygnes by Charles Jude (June 2015)
- Gala Petipa (October 2015)
- Aurore in:La Belle au bois dormant by Charles Jude (December 2015)
- La Reine Morte di Kader Belarbi (March 2016)
- rôle-titre in Giselle by Charles Jude (May 2016)
- Le Messie by Mauricio Wainrot (June 2016)
- Duo de Don Quichotte by Massenet, choreography by Blanca Li (Les Voyages de Don Quichotte September 2016),
- Ariel:La Tempête by Mauricio Wainrot (November 2016)
- The travels of Don Quixote (September 2016)
- Coppélia (December 2016)
- Roméo et Juliette (July 2017)
- If to Leave is to Remember by Carolyn Carlson and Suite en blanc di Serge Lifar (October 2017)
- Don Quixote (December 2017)
- Le Riche by Carolyn Carlson (March 2018)
- Notre-Dame de Paris (July 2019)
- Cinderella (December 2019)

=== Curiosities ===
Besides dancing, Sara has these hobbies: Meditation, TV series, cinema, travelling, Latin American dance

On 21 July 2017 Sara has married in Alcamo with Riccardo Sardonè, an Italian actor and film director.

== Sources ==
- Giornale della danza
- Pagina su Trapani ok
- Sara Renda: ”Vivo di emozioni nel mondo speciale della danza”
- Sara Renda
- Concorso di Varna
- Pagina su Repubblica cronaca di Palermo
- Pagina su Golfoweb
