= Sara Thornton =

Sara Thornton may refer to:

- Sara Thornton (police officer) (born 1962), British police officer
- Sara Thornton case, 1990 British legal case concerning a woman who killed her physically abusive husband

== See also ==
- Sarah Thornton (born 1965), Canadian writer and sociologist of culture
