= Sara Hauge =

Norwegian-Swedish civil society leader

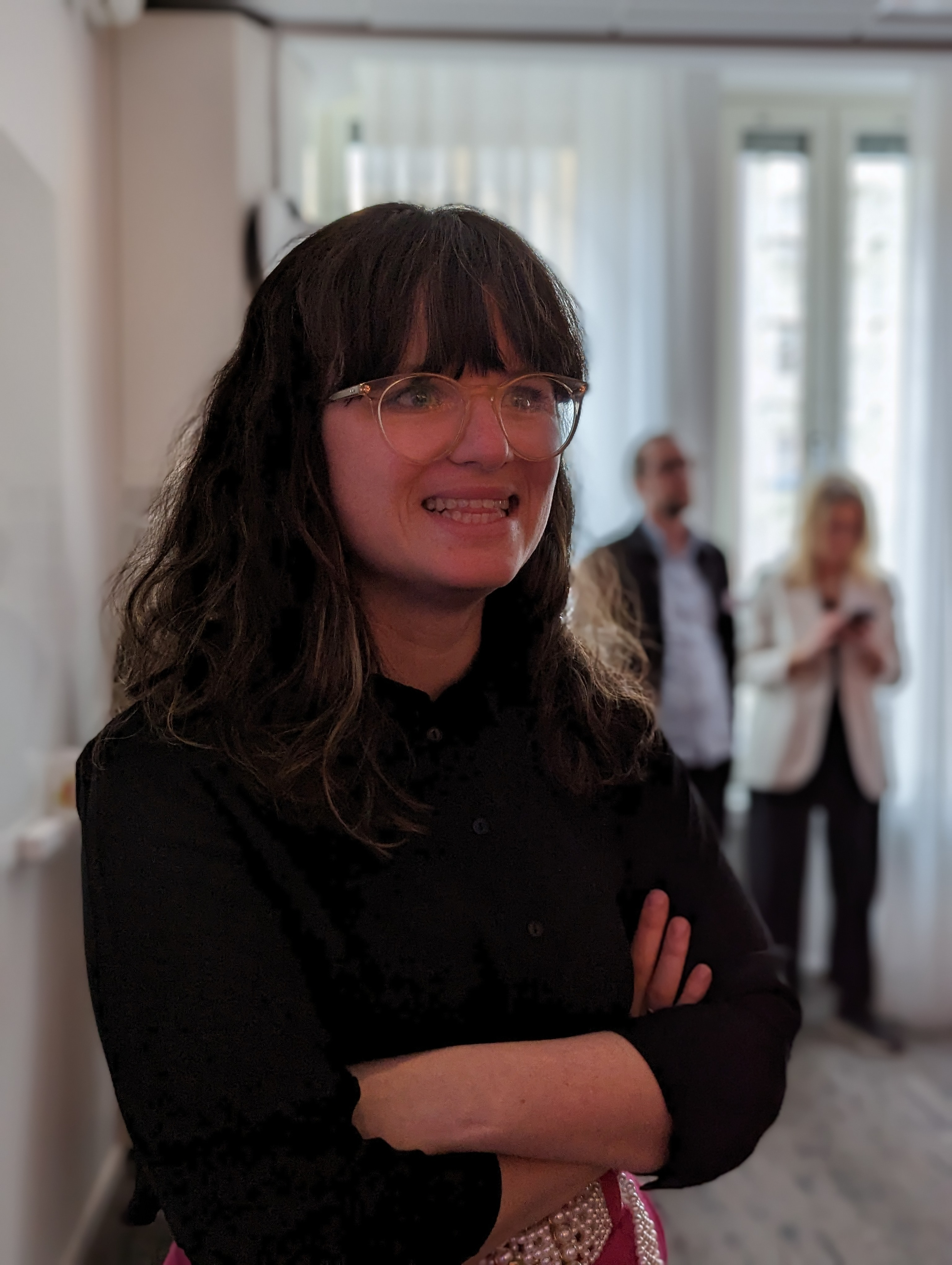
- Born: May 27, 1992 (age 33); Gjøvik, Norway
- Education: University of Oslo; Bømlo Folkehøgskule
- Occupations: Politician, Civil Society Leader, Secretary General
- Years active: 2015-
- Organizations: Hyperion (organisasjon); Sverok
- Title: Secretary General of Sverok
- Term: 2020-
- Predecessor: Position Established
- Political party: Left Party (Sweden)
- Partner: Mårten Hauge

Sara Hauge (born 27 May 1992; from Gjøvik, Norway), is a Norwegian-Swedish civil society leader, mainly in the gaming hobby.

== Career ==
Hauge has been Secretary General of Sverok since 2020 and Association Developer 2018–2020. Between 2015 and 2018, Hauge was Secretary General of Sverok's Norwegian counterpart Hyperion. Among other things, she has worked to strengthen the role of girls and women in the gaming hobby by starting the Norwegian Heltinne project. In 2018, she moved to Sweden to become an association developer for Sverok.

Sara Hauge is a leisure politician and a deputy member of the Culture and Leisure Committee for the Left Party in Sundbyberg, where she lives. Sara Hauge is also a member of the council for the civil society platform Ideell arena and serves on the national election committee for Studiefrämjandet.

In 2023, Hauge was ranked 22nd on Ledarna's list of Female Leaders of the Future.
