= Sara Oldfield =

British conservationist

Sara Felicity Oldfield OBE has been Secretary General of Botanic Gardens Conservation International (BGCI) since May 2005. Previously she worked as Global Programmes Director for Fauna & Flora International. She has worked for a wide range of other conservation organisations, including UNEP World Conservation Monitoring Centre and Royal Botanic Gardens, Kew and also as a freelance consultant for over ten years, working as a researcher and policy advisor for international biodiversity conservation.

Sara is also Chair of the IUCN/SSC Global Tree Specialist Group, responsible for promoting and implementing projects to identify and protect globally Red Listed tree species. She is an accomplished author, and has published a number of research papers and books, most recently writing for and about botanic gardens under the auspices of BGCI.

Oldfield was appointed Officer of the Order of the British Empire (OBE) in the 2016 Birthday Honours for services to the conservation and protection of wild tree species worldwide.
