= Sara Ballantyne =

Sara Ballantyne may refer to:

- Sara Ballantyne (field hockey) (born 1964), Canadian field hockey player
- Sara Ballantyne (cyclist) (born 1960), American cross-country mountain biker
