= Saranya (given name) =

Saranya is a Hindu goddess. Saranya may also refer to:

- Saranya Bhagyaraj (born 1984), Indian actress
- Saranya Mohan (born 1989), Indian actress
- Saranya Ponvannan (born 1970), Indian actress
- Saranya Nag, Indian actress
- Saranya Sasi (1986–2021), Indian actress
