= Sarabeth =

Feminine given name

Sarabeth or Sarahbeth or Sara Beth or Sarah Beth is a feminine given name, an English combination of the names Sara or Sarah and Beth.

== Women ==
- Sarah Beth Durst (born 1974), American author of fantasy
- Sara Beth Gregory, American politician and jurist
- Sarabeth Kusick (1949 – 2005), wife of American professional baseball first baseman and designated hitter Craig Kusick
- Sarahbeth Purcell (born c. 1976-77), American author
- Sarabeth Tucek, American singer-songwriter

== Fictional characters ==
- Sarabeth Cohen, a character in the 2004 American coming-of-age movie The Tollbooth
- Sarabeth Ellis, a character in the 2012 American war film War Flowers

== See also ==
- Skin (Sarabeth), a 2005 country western song written by Doug Johnson and Joe Henry, and recorded by American country music group Rascal Flatts
