= Sara Bals =

Belgian nanoscientist

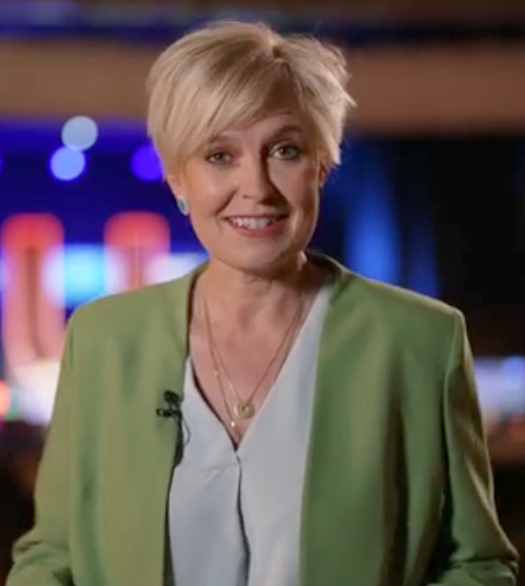
- In a 2022 video
- Born: 25 August 1977 (age 49); Antwerp, Belgium
- Education: University of Antwerp
- Occupation: Nanoscientist
- Known for: 3D electron tomography

Sara Bals (born 1977) is a Belgian nanoscientist known for her research on electron tomography and its application in the study of nanomaterials such as perovskite nanocrystals. She is a professor of electron microscopy for materials science at the University of Antwerp.

== Education and career ==
Bals was born 25 August 1977 in Antwerp. She was educated in physics at the University of Antwerp, earning a master's degree in 1999 and completing her Ph.D. there in 2003. Her dissertation was Optimisation of superconducting thin films and tapes by transmission electron microscopy.

After postdoctoral research in the National Center for Electron Microscopy at Lawrence Berkeley National Laboratory and at the University of Antwerp, she became an assistant professor at the University of Antwerp in 2007. She was promoted to associate professor in 2012 and full professor in 2018.

== Recognition ==
Bals was elected to the Royal Flemish Academy of Belgium for Science and the Arts in 2019. In 2020 she was the winner of the JEOL-EM Award for Physical/Materials Sciences and Optics, given quadrennially by the European Microscopy Society. The award cited "her outstanding achievements in the field of 3D electron tomography", "combining state-of-the-art electron microscopy with advanced reconstruction algorithms".

Bals was elected to Academia Europaea in 2022.
