= Sara Staykova =

Bulgarian rhythmic gymnast

- Nickname: Sunshine
- Born: 13 November 1993 (age 32) Plovdiv, Bulgaria

Gymnastics career
- Discipline: Rhythmic gymnastics
- Country represented: Bulgaria; (2013-2016)
- Club: Levski-Triaditsa
- Head coach: Efrosina Angelova
- Assistant coach: Maria Kancheva
- Retired: yes

Sara Staykova (Bulgarian: Сара Стайкова; born 13 November 1993) is a retired Bulgarian rhythmic gymnast. She represented her country in international competitions.

== Career ==
Sara took up gymnastics at age five, her mother encouraged her to take up the sport and was her first coach.

In April 2013 she took 11th place at the Baltic Hoop tournament in Riga, where she also was 8th in the ball final. In 2014 she competed in the World Cup in Debrecen, being 12th overall, 14th with hoop, 11th with ball, 15th with clubs and 11th with ribbon. A week later she was 21st in the All-Around, 20th with hoop, 16th with ball, 22nd with clubs and 21st with ribbon in Stuttgart. In Lisbon she finished 19th in the All-Around, 29th with hoop, 12th with ball, 11th with clubs and 16th with ribbon. That year she won bronze, behind Maria Mateva and Neviana Vladinova, at the Bulgarian Championships.

The following year she took part in the Bucharest World Cup, being 19th in the All-Around, 16th with hoop, 14th with ball, 30th with clubs and 23rd with ribbon. In August, participating in the World Cup in Budapest, she was 23rd in the All-Around, 37th with hoop, 20th with ball, 20th with clubs and 25th with ribbon. In September Sara was selected for her maiden World Championships in Stuttgart, competing with clubs and ribbons she took 47th and 37th place with the two apparatuses and was 7th in teams along Neviana Vladinova and Mariya Mateva.

In 2016 she finished in 3rd place in the first control training of the national team. A month later she was second place of the 2nd control training. In late February she competed in the World Cup in Espoo, being 18th overall, 27th with hoop, 20th with ball, 15th with clubs and 18th with ribbon. At the Julieta Shishmanova tournament she was 5th. In the World Cup stage in Pesaro she took 27th place in the All-Around, 18th with hoop, 24th with ball, 41st with clubs and 31st with ribbon. In April she won bronze with ribbon at nationals. In May she announced she made the decision to retire. Staykova studied coaching at the Vasil Levski National Sports Academy in Sofia.
