= Journal of Research in Science Teaching =

- Discipline: Science education
- Language: English
- Edited by: Matthew Kloser, Edna Tan and Dana Vedder-Weiss

Publication details
- History: 1963–present
- Publisher: John Wiley & Sons
- Frequency: 10 issues/year
- Impact factor: 4.832 (2020)

Standard abbreviations
- ISO 4: J. Res. Sci. Teach.

Indexing
- CODEN: JRSTAR
- ISSN: 0022-4308 (print); 1098-2736 (web)
- LCCN: 65009103
- OCLC no.: 612964789

Links
- Journal homepage; Online access; Online archive

The Journal of Research in Science Teaching is a peer-reviewed academic journal covering science education. It was established in 1963 and is published ten times per year by John Wiley & Sons. The journal is the official journal of NARST: A global organization for improving science education through research. The journal publishes manuscripts in the field of science teaching and learning and science education policy. These include investigations employing qualitative, ethnographic, historical, survey, philosophical, case study research, quantitative, experimental, quasi-experimental, data mining, and data analytics approaches; position papers; policy perspectives; critical reviews of the literature; and comments and criticism.

Current editors-in-chief are Matthew Kloser (Institute for Educational Initiatives at University of Notre Dame), Edna Tan (University of North Carolina Greensboro) and Dana Vedder-Weiss (Ben-Gurion University of the Negev). According to the Journal Citation Reports, the journal has a 2020 impact factor of 4.832, ranking it 21st out of 265 journals in the category "Education & Educational Research".
