= Sara Macel =

American photographer

Sara Macel (born 1981) is an American photographer.

Born in Houston, Texas, Macel received a BFA degree in 2003 from the Tisch School of the Arts at New York University, and an MFA degree from the School of Visual Arts in 2011.

Her work is included in the collections of the Museum of Fine Arts Houston, and Light Work. Macel's exhibits include the 2019 group exhibit, "The Searchers," at the Center for Photography at Woodstock. She has published three works: May the Road Rise to Meet You (2013), Kiss & Tell (2015), and What Did the Deep Sea Say (2022). In 2014, Macel was an Artist in residence at The Wassiac Project.

Macel is an Instructor of Art and Photography at the School of Arts and Humanities at Rockland Community College.
