= Sara Lewis =

American biologist

Sara Margery Lewis
- Education: Harvard College (AB in Biology), Duke University (Ph.D. in Zoology)
- Scientific career
- Fields: Biology, coral reef ecology, insect reproductive behavior
- Workplaces: Tufts University

Sara Margery Lewis is an American biologist, professor, author, and firefly expert.

Lewis is a professor emerita of biology at Tufts University, co-chair of the Firefly Specialist Group at the Species Survival Commission of the International Union for the Conservation of Nature, and author of the 2016 book, Silent Sparks: The Wondrous World of Fireflies.

== Education ==
Lewis graduated from Harvard College with an AB in Biology in 1976. After Harvard, she studied at Duke University where she earned a Ph.D. in Zoology in 1984. Based at a Smithsonian Institution marine station off the coast of Belize, Lewis' graduate work focused on the subject of coral reef ecology, examining the mechanisms behind which herbivorous fish grazing mediates competitive interactions between seaweeds and reef-building corals.

== Academic career ==
In 1985, Lewis returned to Harvard where she spent the next five years as a postdoctoral fellow in organismic and evolutionary biology. Her postdoctoral research analyzed the subject of sexual selection in fireflies and flour beetles.

In 1991, Lewis joined the faculty at the Tufts University Department of Biology. Lewis has taught classes in biostatistics, ecology, and science communication as well as classes more closely related to her research including Edible Insects and Evaluating Firefly Extinction Risk Seminar.

== Scientific research ==
Lewis' research work has focused on coral reef ecology, the evolution of reproductive behavior in insects, and fireflies. Lewis has published research on these topics including demonstrating that both cryptic female choice and male sperm competition contribute to postcopulatory sexual selection in Tribolium flour beetles; showing that Photinus firefly females choose mates based on male flash characteristics; revealing the presence, coevolution, and composition of firefly nuptial gifts; and describing how hermit crabs queue up to form vacancy chains that distribute resource benefits to multiple crabs.

== Firefly conservation ==
Lewis is a founding member of Fireflyers International, a group dedicated to the conservation of fireflies and their habitats. Since 2018, Lewis has worked with the Species Survival Commission of the International Union for the Conservation of Nature as co-chair of the Firefly Specialist Group, a team of international experts who identified the key threats faced by fireflies, which include habitat degradation, light pollution, pesticides, and climate change.

== Works ==
=== Books ===
- Lewis, S. 2016. Silent Sparks: The Wondrous World of Fireflies. Princeton University Press. 250 pp. (Winner of 2016 Best Science/Nature Book - Independent Book Publisher Award)
- Lewis, S. 2017. Leuchten in der Stille: Über Glühwürmchen und das Glück des Moments. Bastei Lubbe.

=== Selected articles ===
- Owens, Avalon C. S.; Lewis, Sara M. (2022). "Artificial light impacts the mate success of female fireflies". Royal Society Open Science. 9 (8) 220468. Bibcode:2022RSOS....920468O. doi:10.1098/rsos.220468. PMC 9364009. PMID 35958085.
- Owens, Avalon C. S.; Dressler, Caroline T.; Lewis, Sara M. (2022). "Costs and benefits of "insect friendly" artificial lights are taxon specific". Oecologia. 199 (2): 487–497. Bibcode:2022Oecol.199..487O. doi:10.1007/s00442-022-05189-6. PMID 35650413.
- Fallon, Candace E.; Walker, Anna C.; Lewis, Sara; Cicero, Joseph; Faust, Lynn; Heckscher, Christopher M.; Pérez-Hernández, Cisteil X.; Pfeiffer, Ben; Jepsen, Sarina (2021). "Evaluating firefly extinction risk: Initial red list assessments for North America". PLOS ONE. 16 (11) e0259379. Bibcode:2021PLoSO..1659379F. doi:10.1371/journal.pone.0259379. PMC 8598072. PMID 34788329.
- Owens, Avalon C.S.; Lewis, Sara M. (2021). "Narrow-spectrum artificial light silences female fireflies (Coleoptera: Lampyridae)". Insect Conservation and Diversity. 14 (2): 199–210. doi:10.1111/icad.12487.
- Lewis, Sara M.; Thancharoen, Anchana; Wong, Choong Hay; López-Palafox, Tania; Santos, Paola Velasco; Wu, Chiahsiung; Faust, Lynn; De Cock, Raphaël; Owens, Avalon C. S.; Lemelin, R. Harvey; Gurung, Hum; Jusoh, Wan F. A.; Trujillo, Daniel; Yiu, Vor; López, Pablo Jaramillo; Jaikla, Soraya; Reed, J. Michael (2021). "Firefly tourism: Advancing a global phenomenon toward a brighter future". Conservation Science and Practice. 3 (5) e391. Bibcode:2021ConSP...3E.391L. doi:10.1111/csp2.391.
- Owens, Avalon C.S.; Lewis, Sara M. (2021). "Effects of artificial light on growth, development, and dispersal of two North American fireflies (Coleoptera: Lampyridae)". Journal of Insect Physiology. 130 104200. Bibcode:2021JInsP.13004200O. doi:10.1016/j.jinsphys.2021.104200. PMID 33607160.
- Reed, J Michael; Khoo, Veronica; López-Palafox, Tania; Novák, Martin; De Cock, Raphael; Wu, Chiahsiung; Thancharoen, Anchana; Jepsen, Sarina; Fallon, Candace; Owens, Avalon C S.; Wong, Choong Hay; Lewis, Sara M. (2020). "A Global Perspective on Firefly Extinction Threats". BioScience. 70 (2): 157–167. doi:10.1093/biosci/biz157.
