= Sara Osuna =

Spanish professor (born 1958)

Sara Osuna Acedo
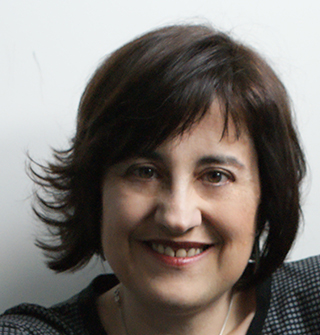
- Born: 1958 (age 67–68); Madrid, Spain

Sara Osuna Acedo (born 1958) has a PhD in Philosophy and Education Sciences by Spain's Universidad Nacional de Educación a Distancia (UNED).

== Career ==
At UNED, she is a Professor of Communication and Education, teaching on Pedagogics and Social Education undergraduate programs. Her expertise mainly focuses on digital technologies, Communication Models and eLearning.

Her main lines of research are MOOCs, Media convergence, Digital scenarios, Disability, eLearning and Social Media. She actively collaborates with a number of European and Latin-American universities on several projects about collaborative learning and communicational models. She has coordinated during three year-long (2014–17), EC-funded (ECO)(Elearning, Communication and Open-data: Mobile, Massive and Ubiquitous Learning). This project was developed between 2014 and 2017, and in which 22 partners from nine different countries participated.

In addition, she holds a master's degree in Integrated Technologies and Knowledge society, as well as credited diplomas as University expert on Free Software (UNED), University Expert on Media Analysis (UNED), and University specialist on Integrated Communication Systems (UNED).

== Publications ==
Sara Osuna Acedo has written more than 50 publications such as books, chapters and reviews in journals:

- Osuna-Acedo, S.; Gil-Quintana, J. (2017) «El proyecto europeo ECO. Rompiendo barreras en el acceso al conocimiento». Educación XX1, 20
- Osuna-Acedo, S.; Frau-Meigs, D.; Camarero-Cano, L.; Pedrosa, R. (2017) «Intercreativity and Interculturality in the Virtual Learning Environments of the ECO MOOC Project». Open Education: from OERs to MOOCs: 161-187
- Osuna-Acedo, S.; Tejera-Osuna, S.M. (2016) «ECO European project: inclusive education through accessible MOOCs». Proceedings of the Fourth International Conference on Technological Ecosystems for Enhancing Multiculturality
- Cantillo-Valero, C.; Osuna-Acedo, S. (2016) «Brumas y claros en el dibujo animado». Proceedings of the Fourth International Conference on Technological Ecosystems for Enhancing Multiculturality. Opción , 32, 7:333-357
- Gil-Quintana, J.; Camarero-Cano, L.; Cantillo-Valero, C.; Osuna-Acedo, S. (2016) «sMOOC and Gamification–A Proposed Ubiquitous Learning». International Symposium on Emerging Technologies for Education: 507-513
- Camarero-Cano, L.; Osuna-Acedo, S. (2016) «Intercreativity And Smooc. The Importance Of The Collective Intelligence In The ECO European Project». International Educational Technology Conference (IETC 2016): 443-452
- Osuna-Acedo, S.; Escaño-González, C. (2016) «CMOOC: transitando caminos educomunicativos hacia el conocimiento democratizado, abierto y común». Revista Mediterránea de Comunicación/Mediterranean Journal of Communication ...: 443-452
- Marta-Lazo, C.; Gabelas-Barroso, J. A.; Osuna-Acedo, S. (2016) «Comunicación digital: un modelo basado en el Factor R-elacional». UOC
