= Suriya (disambiguation) =

Suriya (born 1975) is an Indian actor in Tamil cinema.

Suriya may also refer to:

== People ==
=== Given name ===
- Suriya Amatawech (born 1982), Thai former footballer
- Suriya Bibi (born 1979), Pakistani politician
- Suriya Chiarasapawong (born 1949), former Thai cyclist
- Suriya Chindawongse, Thai diplomat
- Suriya Domtaisong (born 1981), Thai former footballer
- Suriya Evans-Pritchard Jayanti, British-American entrepreneur, journalist and lawyer
- Suriya Kupalang (born 1988), Thai footballer
- Suriya Juangroongruangkit (born 1954), Thai politician
- Suriya Shahab (1945–2019), Pakistani newscaster, poet and novelist
- Suriya Singmui (born 1995), Thai footballer

=== Surname ===
- Oswind Suriya (born 1989), Singaporean former footballer
- Rung Suriya (born 1969), Thai singer
- Sathish Suriya (born 1976), Indian film editor
- Vijay Suriya (born 1990), Indian actor and presenter

=== Mononym ===
- Suriya (singer) (born 1979), former member of the duo S.O.A.P.

== Places ==
- Sūriyā, the Arabic name for Syria
- Suriya, Giridih, India
  - Suriya (community development block)
- Suriya Coffee, Bangkok, Thailand

== Other uses ==
- Suriya al-Ghad, former Syrian television news channel
- Suriya Paarvai, 1999 Indian Tamil-language film
- Trismelasmos suriya, moth of the Cossidae family

== See also ==
- Suraya (disambiguation)
- Suria (disambiguation)
- Surya (disambiguation)
- Suryaa (disambiguation)
