= Suraj =

Suraj may refer to:

== People ==
- Suraj Singh (disambiguation)

=== Arts and entertainment ===
- Suraj (director), Indian director
- Suraj Jagan, Indian playback singer
- Suraj Mani, Indian musical artist
- Suraj Pawar, Indian actor
- Suraj Sharma (born 1993), Indian actor
- Suraj Singh Thakuri, Nepali presenter, director and producer
- Suraj Venjaramoodu (born 1976), Malayalam film actor and mimicry artist

=== Sport ===
- Suraj Lata Devi (born 1981), former captain of the India women's national hockey team
- Suraj Narredu (born 1985), Indian jockey
- Suraj Randiv (born 1985), Sri Lankan international cricketer
- Sodiq Suraj (born 1988), Nigerian football player who currently plays for Prime F.C.

=== Other fields ===
- Suraj Mal (1707–1763), ruler of Bharatpur, Rajasthan, India
- Suraj Bhan (born 1928), Indian politician
- Suraj Bhan (archaeologist) (1931—2010), Indian archaeologist
- Suraj N. Gupta (1924–2021), Indian-born American theoretical physicist
- Suraj Yengde (born 1988), Indian scholar

== Other uses ==
- Suraj (film), a 1966 Indian Hindi-language film by T. Prakash Rao, starring Rajendra Kumar and Vyjayanthimala
- Suraj, a fictional character portrayed by Danny Denzongpa in the 1979 Indian film Lahu Ke Do Rang
- Suraj, a fictional character in the 2010 Indian film Raajneeti
- Suraj: The Rising Star, an Indian animated television series
- Suraj, Oman, a village in Muscat, Oman

== See also ==
- Surya (disambiguation)
