= Sri Sunama Jakini Matha =

Hindu temple in India

Sri Sunama Jakini Maata
- Sri Sunama Jakini Maata

Religion
- Affiliation: Hinduism
- District: Anantapur district
- Deity: Sri Sunama Jakini maata and Sri Malkuma Jakini maata
- Festivals: Annual jaatara, Ugadi and Dasara

Location
- Location: Gooty
- State: Andhra Pradesh
- Country: India
- Interactive map of Sri Sunama Jakini Maata
- Coordinates: 15°7′59.45″N 77°37′34.28″E

Architecture
- Type: Hindu temple architecture
- Completed: 2003
- Temple: 1

Website
- http://www.sunama-jakini.com

Sri Sunama Jakini Maata is a temple built to honor a legendary Indian woman who was deified.

She was born in Suryavamshi Kshatriya Are-Katika community of Pinnepalli village in Anantapur district, Andhra Pradesh, India. A temple was built for this goddess in Gooty town of Anantapur district, Andhra Pradesh is also one of the first temples for Suryavamshi Kshatriya Are-katika community.

== History ==
Sri Sunama Jakini maata was born in Malkari gotram from the Are-Katika community at Pinnepalli village of Yadiki mandal, Anantapur district (officially: Anantapuramu), Andhra Pradesh state of India. She married Hanumanthakari Thanji Rao at a very young age. She was very devotional and use to observe fasting very often. One day during fasting she fell unconscious. Her husband thought that she was dead and ordered to bury her. Locals requested her husband to pass on the message to her mother, father and brothers who live in Pinnepalli village. Her husband did not allow this. As the locals were getting ready to bury her, they found that Sunama maata was still alive and informed the same to her husband. Under the influence of alcohol her husband ordered them to bury her anyways. In that sense Sunama Jakini maata took Jeeva Samadhi (Buddhism: Nirvana). It is estimated that this incident took place around 1803 AD.

Sunama maata's family members came to know about the incident after some days and had an argument with her husband. In a fit of rage he told them not to argue with him and to go to her grave and cry. Her family members found white fresh flowers on her grave even after several days. They heard a celestial voice (Akashvani) directing them to get Sunama maata's husband married to her sister Malkuma Jakini. Her family members refused and gossiped about this unnecessarily. Later they realised their mistake and agreed to the marriage. From that time onwards, Sunama Jakini Maata is worshipped as goddess re-incarnation by the Are-Katika community.

== Temple History ==
The foundation stone for the temple was laid on 22-02-2002 and prana pratishtha was done on 14–02–2003. On second annual celebration i.e., on 17-02-2005 and 18-02-2005 Shikhara was consecrated. From that year onwards annual celebrations (jaatara) is conducted on second Thursday and Friday of Maagha maasam of Indian Hindu calendar.

Devotees from Andhra Pradesh, Telangana, Karnataka, Tamilnadu, Pondicherry and Maharashtra states visit temple during annual celebrations (jaatara). The temple attracts approximately 15-20 thousand pilgrims during every annual jaatara.

Occasion	Start date	End date
First Annual Celebration	30-Jan-2004	30-Jan-2004
Second Annual celebrations & Shikhara consecration	17-Feb-2005	18-Feb-2005
Third Annual Celebrations	09-Feb-2006	10-Feb-2006
Fourth Annual Celebrations	01-Feb-2007	02-Feb-2007
Fifth Annual Celebrations	14-Feb-2008	15-Feb-2008
Sixth Annual Celebrations	05-Feb-2009	06-Feb-2009
Seventh Annual Celebrations	28-Jan-2010	29-Jan-2010
Eighth Annual Celebrations	27-Jan-2011	28-Jan-2011
Ninth Annual Celebrations	02-Feb-2012	03-Feb-2012
Tenth Annual Celebrations	21-Feb-2013	22-Feb-2013
Eleventh Annual Celebrations	06-Feb-2014	07-Feb-2014
Twelfth Annual Celebrations	29-Jan-2015	30-Jan-2015
Thirteenth Annual Celebrations	18-Feb-2016	19-Feb-2016
Fourteenth Annual Celebrations	09-Feb-2017	10-Feb-2017
Fifteenth Annual Celebrations	25-Jan-2018	26-Jan-2018
Sixteenth Annual Celebrations	14-Feb-2019	15-Feb-2019
Seventeenth Annual Celebrations	06-Feb-2020	07-Feb-2020
Eighteenth Annual Celebrations	18-Feb-2021	19-Feb-2021
Nineteenth Annual Celebrations	10-Feb-2022	11-Feb-2022
Twentieth Annual Celebrations	02-Feb-2023	03-Feb-2023
Twenty first Annual Celebrations	02-Feb-2023	03-Feb-2023
Twenty second Annual Celebrations	06-Feb-2025	07-Feb-2025

== Administration ==
Temple committee manages the development activities of Sree Sunama Jakini Maata temple. It is operated by an elected body through elections among the are-katika community members.

== Transport ==
=== Road ===
Gooty is connected by road to major cities as it is on National Highway 44 (formerly NH 7). State government owned Andhra Pradesh State Road Transport Corporation (APSRTC) operates buses from Gooty bus station to other parts of the state. Gooty is 313 km away from Hyderabad, 262 km from Bangalore and 69 km from Anantapur (officially: Anantapuramu).

=== Train ===
Gooty railway station is located on Guntakal–Chennai Egmore section of South Central Railways. Gooty is 325 km away from Hyderabad, 253 km from Bangalore and 57 km from Anantapur (officially: Anantapuramu).

== Other Temples ==
Other temples in and around Gooty
(Distance mentioned for the below temples is from Sri Sunama Jakini Matha temple)
Ankalamma Temple - It is 2.4 km away
Shirdi Sai Baba Temple - It is 2.5 km away
Pothuluri Veera Brahmendra Swamy Temple - It is 2.1 km away
Boli Konda Ranganatha Swamy - It is 2 km away
Krishna Temple - It is 2.1 km away
Sri Vasavi Kanyaka Parameswari Temple - It is 2.1 km away
Puligutta Bhaktha Anjaneya Swamy - It is 2.5 km away
Sri Harihara Putra Temple - It is approximately 2 km away
Kota Lakshmi Narasimha Swamy Temple - It is 3 km away
Sri Nettikanti Anjaneya SwamyTemple, Kasapuram, Guntakal - It is 31.1 km away

== Gallery ==
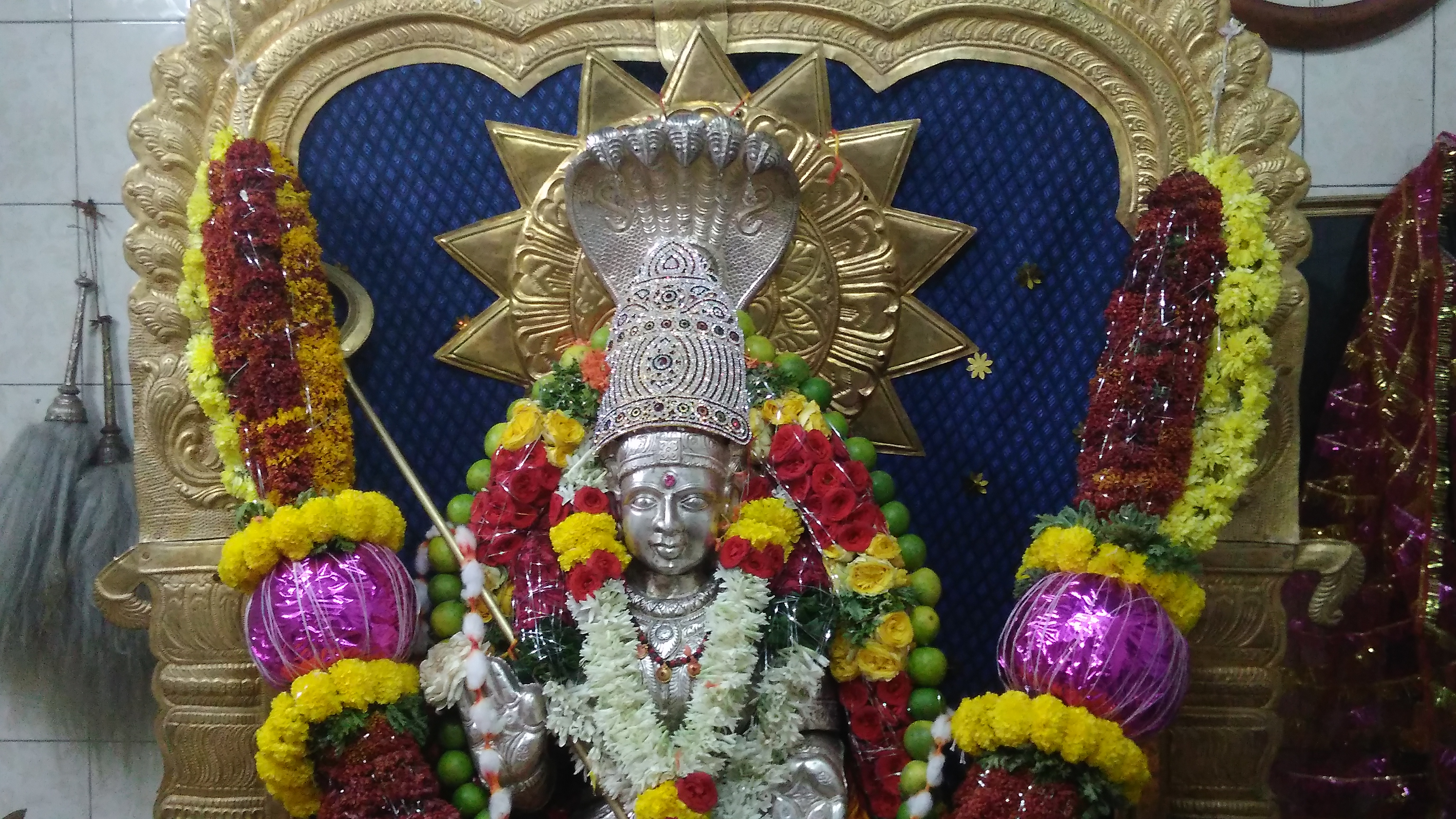
Sunama Jakini Maatha

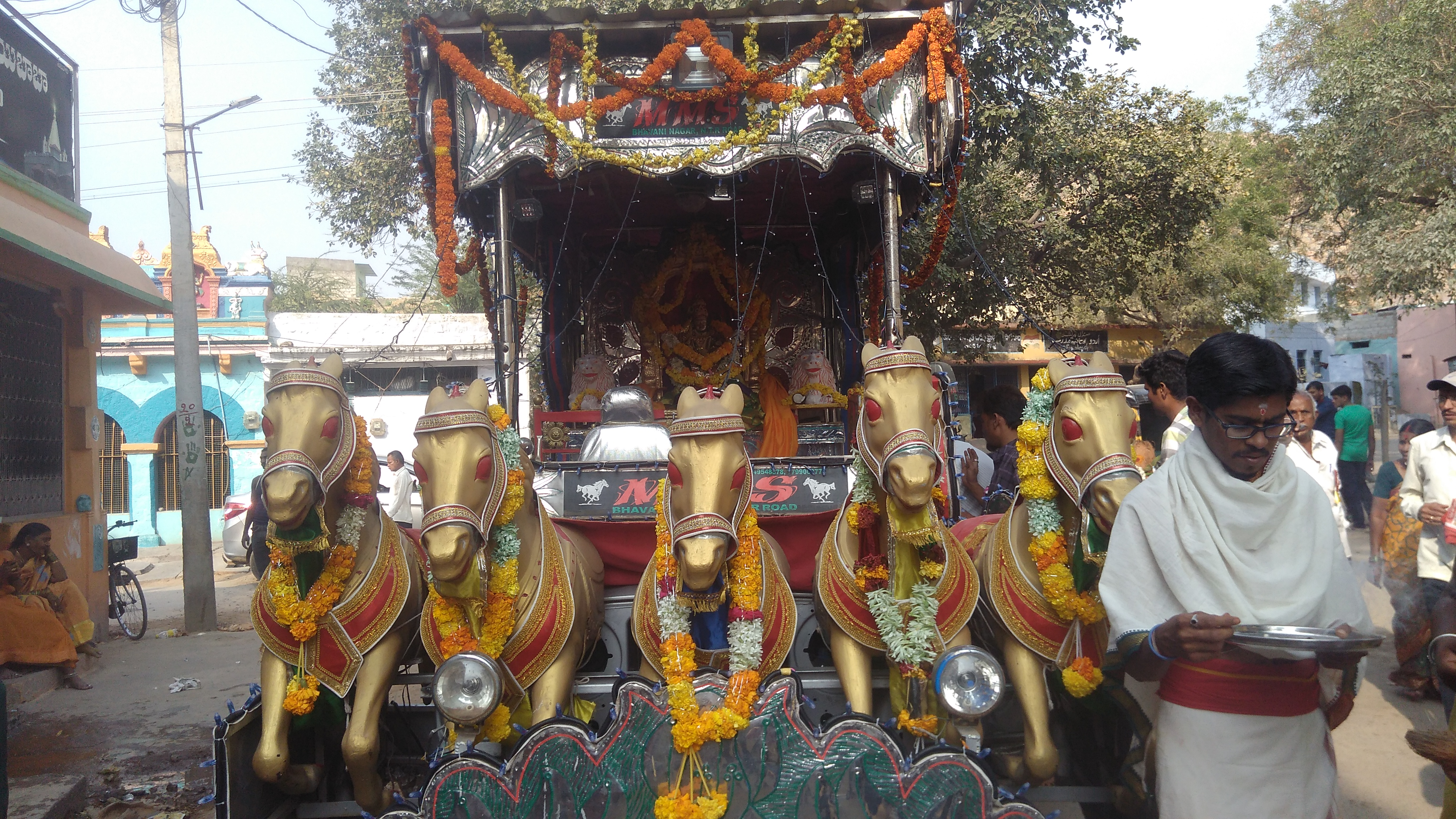
Procession during annual celebrations

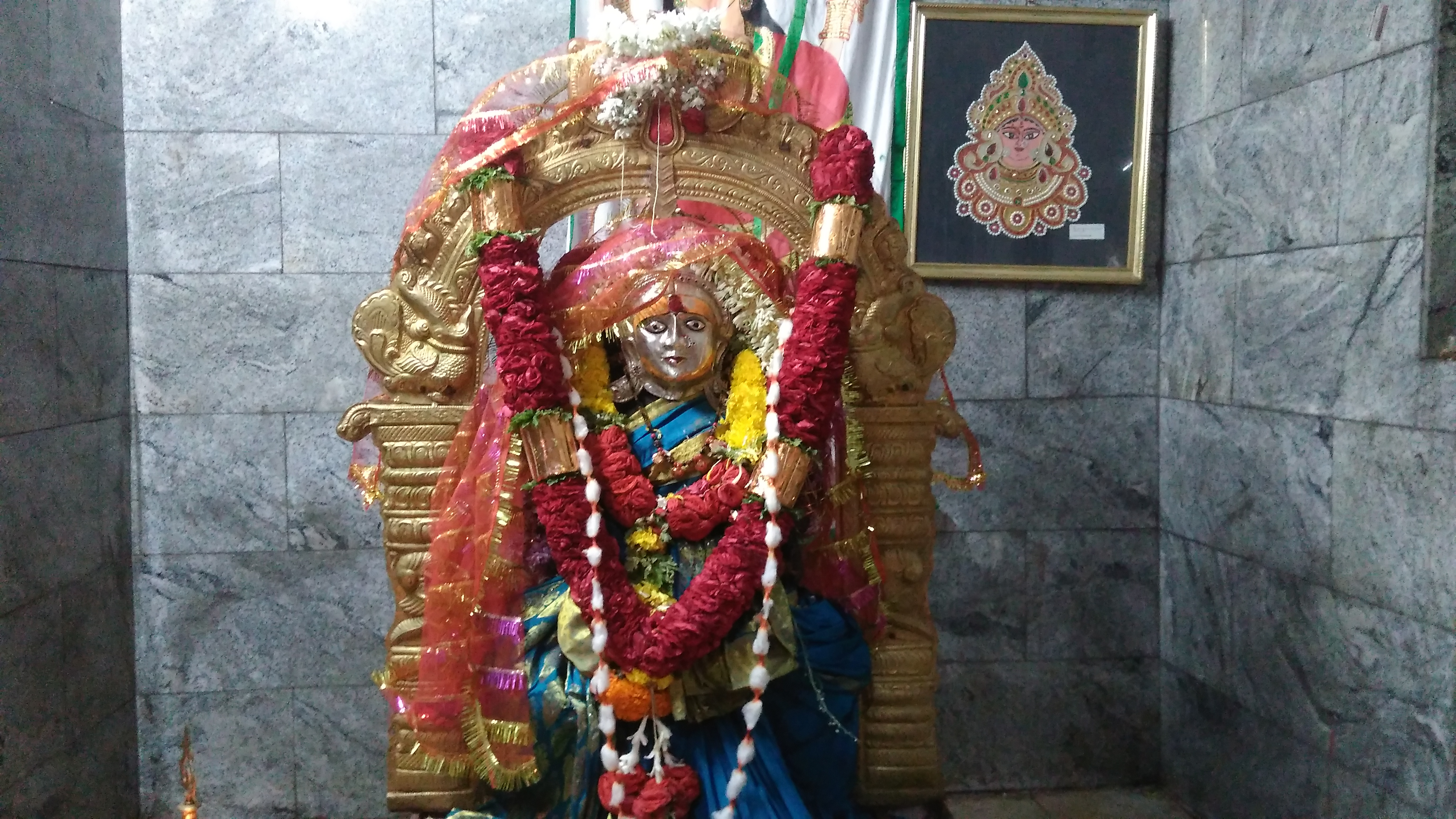
Malkuma Jakini maatha

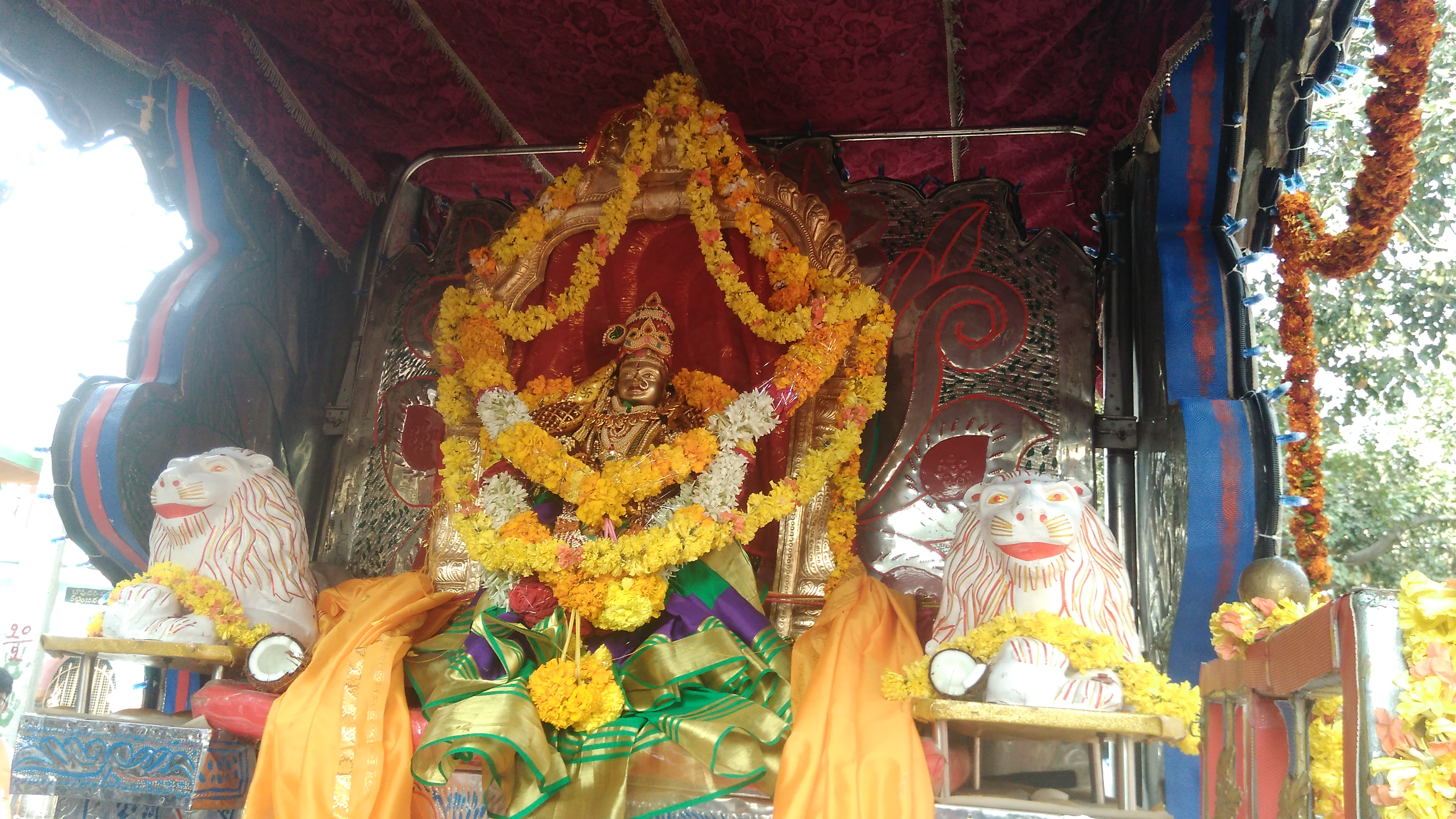
Utsava Murti
