= Suryaputra =

Suryaputra may refer to:

- Karna, a character in the ancient Indian epic Mahabharata, the son (putra) of the solar god Surya
- The epithet is also applied to Shani, Yama, Varuna, Ashvini Kumar, Sugriva
- Suryaputra Karn, Indian mythological television series about the character
- Sunshine countries, part of the International Solar Alliance for solar energy launched in 2015 in India

== See also ==
- Surya (disambiguation)
- Putra (disambiguation)
