= Suryavanshi =

Suryavanshi or Suryawanshi may refer to:

== People ==
- Are Katika, or Suryavanshi, an ethnic group of southern India
- Anand Suryavanshi (born 1957), Indian actor
- Digangana Suryavanshi (born 1997), Indian actress, singer, and author
- Sarjarao Suryavanshi (born 1926), Indian wrestler
- Narsingrao Suryawanshi (born 1952), Indian politician
- Ashish Suryawanshi (born 1990), Indian cricketer
- Chetan Suryawanshi (born 1985), Singaporean cricketer
- Vaibhav Sooryavanshi (born 2011), Indian cricketer

== Film ==
- Suryavanshi (film), a 1992 Indian Hindi-language film
- Sooryavansham, a 1999 Indian Hindi-language drama film by E. V. V. Satyanarayana, starring Amitabh Bachchan
- Sooryavanshi, a 2021 Indian Hindi-language Indian action film by Rohit Shetty, part of the Cop Universe

== See also ==
- Suryavamsam (disambiguation)
- Surya (disambiguation)
- Vamsi (disambiguation)
- Suryavansh or Solar dynasty, a mythical dynasty in ancient Indian literature
- Suryavamsi Gajapati dynasty, dynasty in medieval eastern India
