= Suria =

Suria may refer to:

- Súria, a city in Spain
- Suria (Celtic deity), a female deification of good flowing water in ancient Celtic polytheism
- Suria (radio station), a Malaysian radio station
- Suria (TV channel), a Malay-language television channel in Singapore
- Suria KLCC, a shopping centre in Kuala Lumpur
- Suria Records, a Malaysian music company established in 1970

== See also ==
- Suriya (disambiguation)
- Surya (disambiguation)
- Tomás de Suría (1761–1844), Spanish artist and explorer
