= Mahatma Gandhi Institute of Technology =

Technological institute

- Motto: Knowledge is Power
- Type: Higher education and research institution
- Established: 1997
- Affiliations: Jawaharlal Nehru Technological University, Hyderabad
- Chairman: Sri Praveen D Reddy
- Principal: Dr. G ChandraMohan Reddy
- Location: Hyderabad, Telangana
- Campus: Urban, 30 acres (120,000 m^{2}) of land
- Nickname: MGITian
- Website: www.mgit.ac.in

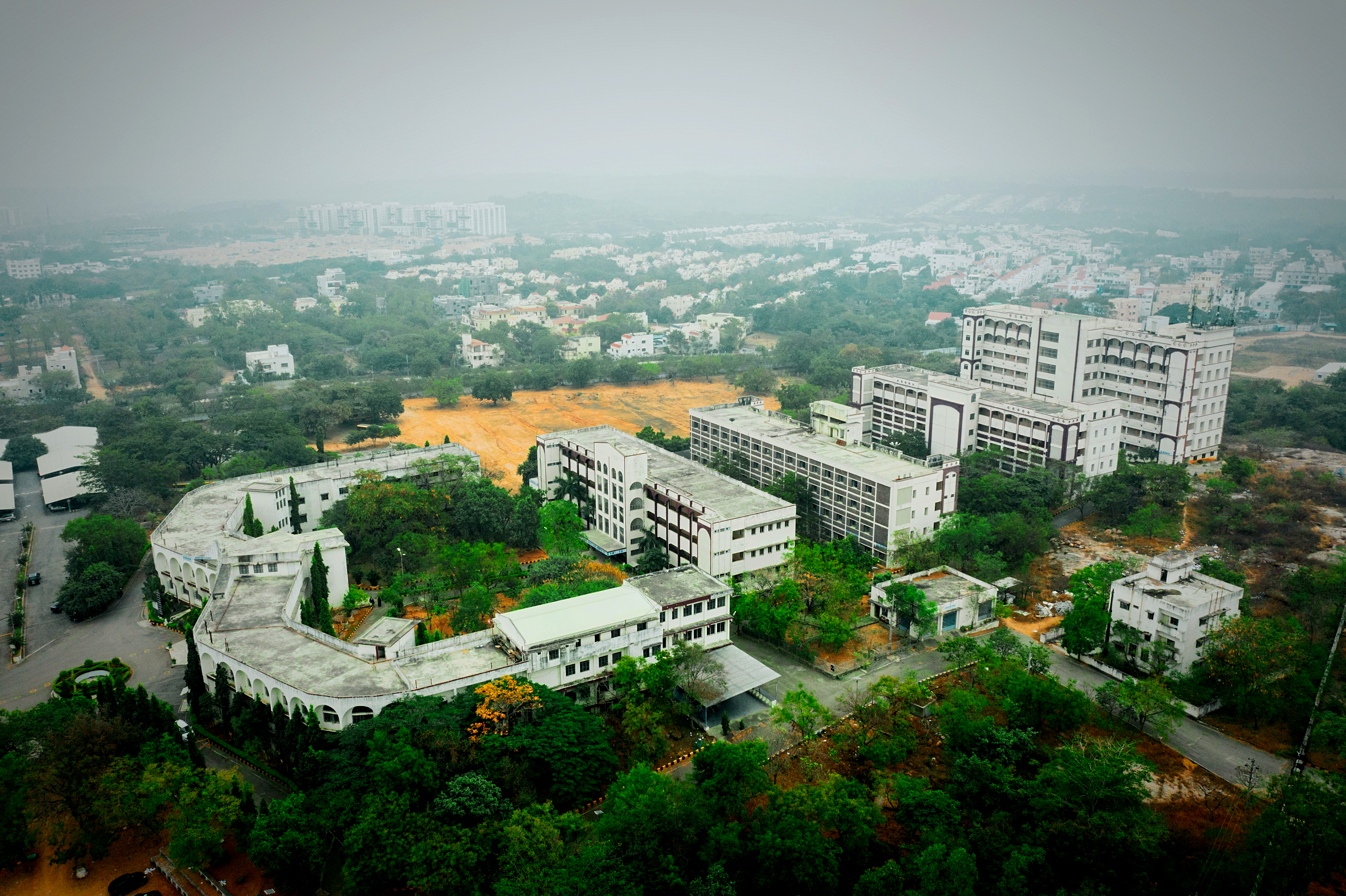
MGIT Campus Aerial view

Mahatma Gandhi Institute of Technology (MGIT) is a technological institution (Autonomous) located in Gandipet, Hyderabad, Telangana, India. It was started in 1997 by the Chaitanya Bharathi Educational Society (CBES), Hyderabad, registered under the Societies Registration Act. The annual intake is 900 students at the undergraduate level and 108 students at the postgraduate level. The institute is affiliated with Jawaharlal Nehru Technological University, Hyderabad (JNTUH), The institute has Autonomous Status till 2021-2031 A.Y. granted by UGC and offers a four-year Bachelor of Technology, in eleven disciplines and two-year Master of Technology, in six disciplines prescribed by JNTU. The college is accredited by the National Board of Accreditation and is ISO 9001:2000 certified

== Rankings ==
- MGIT ranks #6 among all colleges in Telangana by EDU ZO3 College ranking 2020(https://edu.zo3.in/ts-college-list/ecet)
- Ranks #49 among the "Top Engineering Colleges of Excellence in India" according to Competition Success Review's CSR-GHRDC Engineering Colleges Survey 2012 (http://ghrdc.org/pdfs/3%20EnggOverall_Result2012.pdf).
- MGIT ranks #95 among the "Top Engineering Colleges in India" according to The Week (Indian magazine)
- MGIT ranks #32 among the "Top Engineering Colleges in South India" according to Deccan Chronicle
- Also has excellent ratings in surveys conducted by Careers 360, Sakshi, etc.

== Executive leadership ==
- Chairman - Sri Praveen D Reddy
- Board Secretary - Sri J. Pratap Reddy
- Principal - Dr. G ChandraMohan Reddy

== Courses ==
The institute offers a four-year Bachelor's degree Bachelor of Technology [BTECH], in eleven disciplines:

- Computer Science Engineering (CSE)
- Computer Science Engineering - Data Science (CSD)
- Computer Science Engineering - Artificial Intelligence and Machine Learning (CSM)
- Computer Science and Business Systems (CSB)
- Information Technology (INF)
- Electrical and Electronics Engineering (EEE)
- Electronics and Communication Engineering (ECE)
- Mechanical Engineering (Mechatronics) (MCT)
- Metallurgy and Materials Engineering (MME)
- Civil Engineering (CIV)
- Mechanical Engineering (MEC)

The institute offers a two-year master's degree Master of Technology [MTECH], in four departments:

- Mechatronics (MCT)
- Computer Networks & Information Security (CSE)
- Digital Electronics & Communication Engineering(ECE)(From academic year 2012–2013)
- Power Electronics & Electrical Drives(EEE)(From academic year 2012–2013)
- Computer Aided Structural Engineering
- Software Engineering

Every semester has a minimum of eight courses, which includes a minimum of two laboratory courses. Students are required to attain a total of 216 of the possible 224 credits and attend the institute for the duration of not less than four years and not more than eight years to be considered for the award of the degree. The institute follows JNTU's attendance regulation, which requires students to put in a minimum class attendance of 65% to progress to the next semester. External (university) exams are held every semester on the campus and consolidated results in all these exams count towards the final aggregate grading.

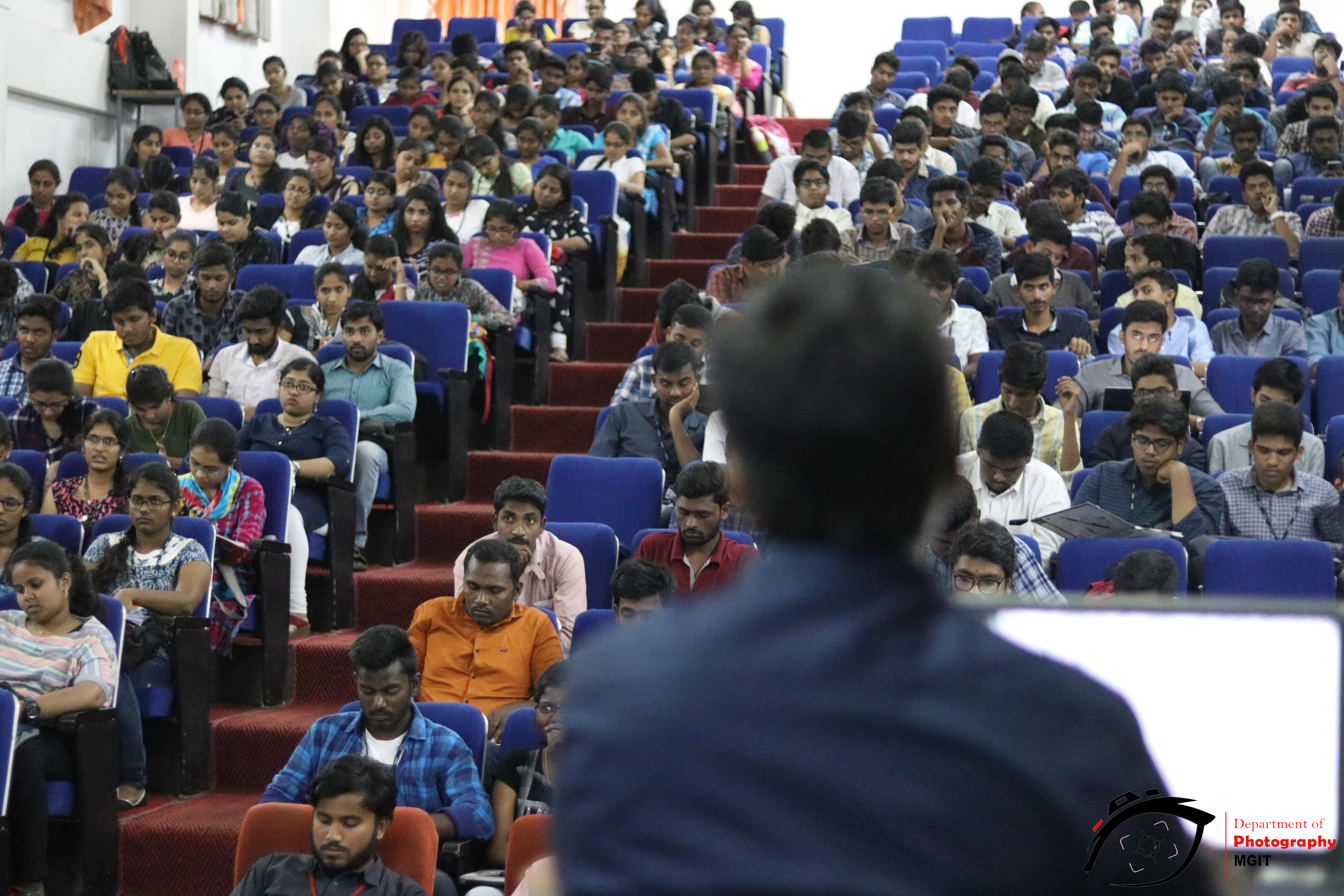
Auditorium

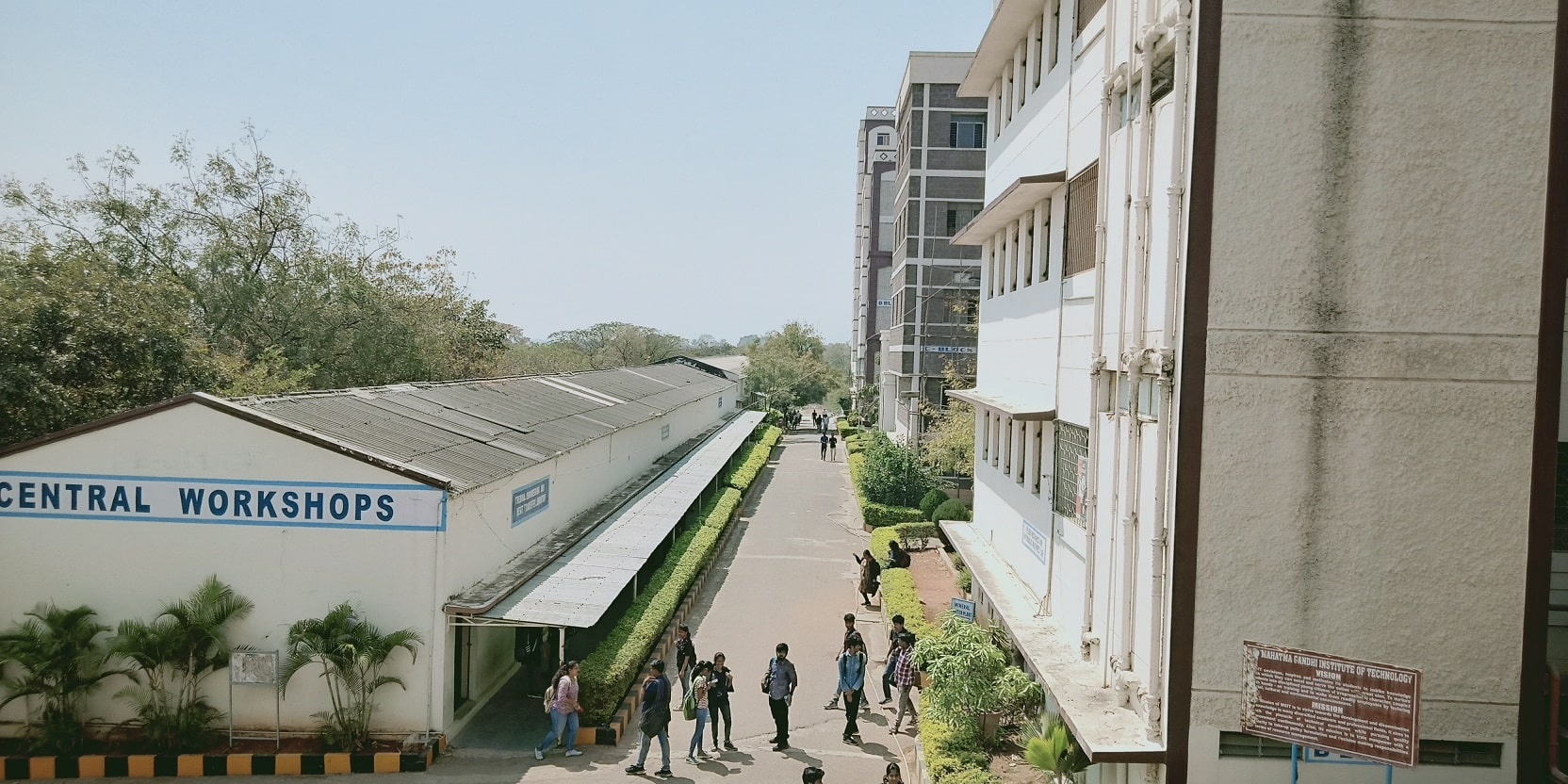
Inside MGIT

== Admissions ==
The minimum criterion for admission is 60% marks in the Intermediate/10+2 Examination. Students are admitted primarily based on their ranks in the Engineering Agricultural and Medical Common Entrance Test EAMCET, held by the JNTUH every year. It also takes lateral entry admissions based on TS ECET ranks.

== Departments ==
The institute has ten departments:

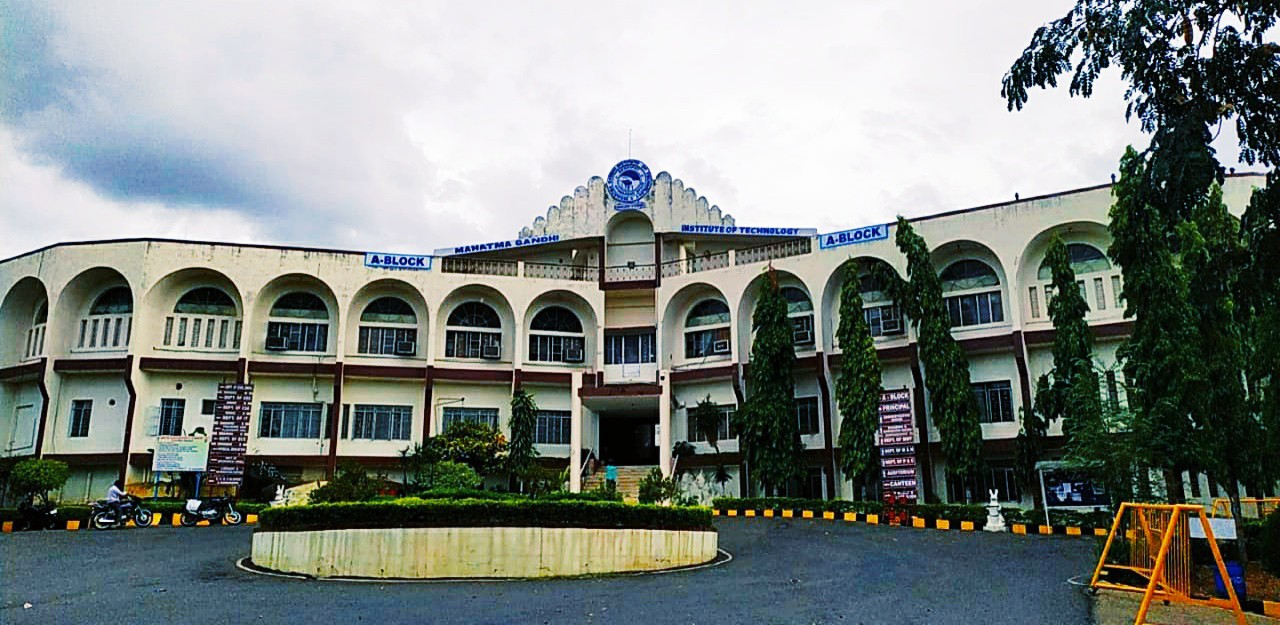
Administration Block

- Department of Mechanical Engineering (Mechatronics)

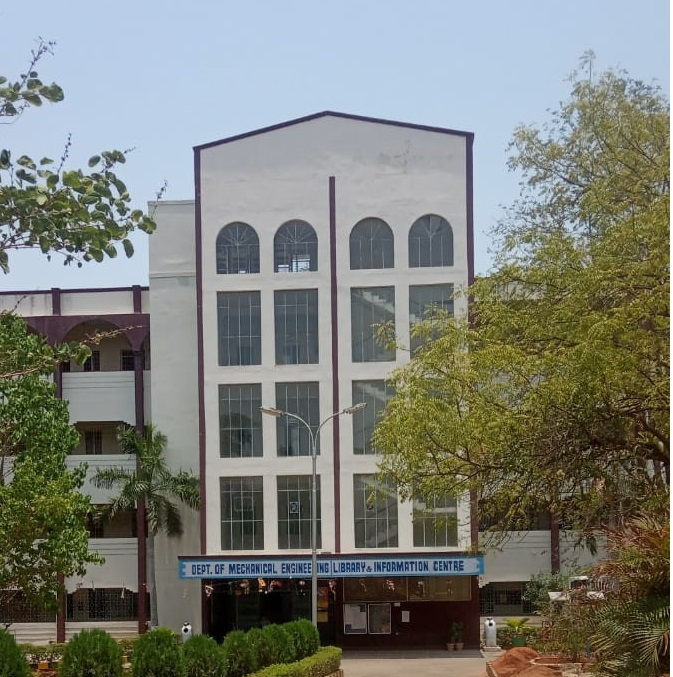
Mechanical Block

- Department of Metallurgy and Materials Technology
- Department of Information Technology
- Department of Computer Science and Engineering
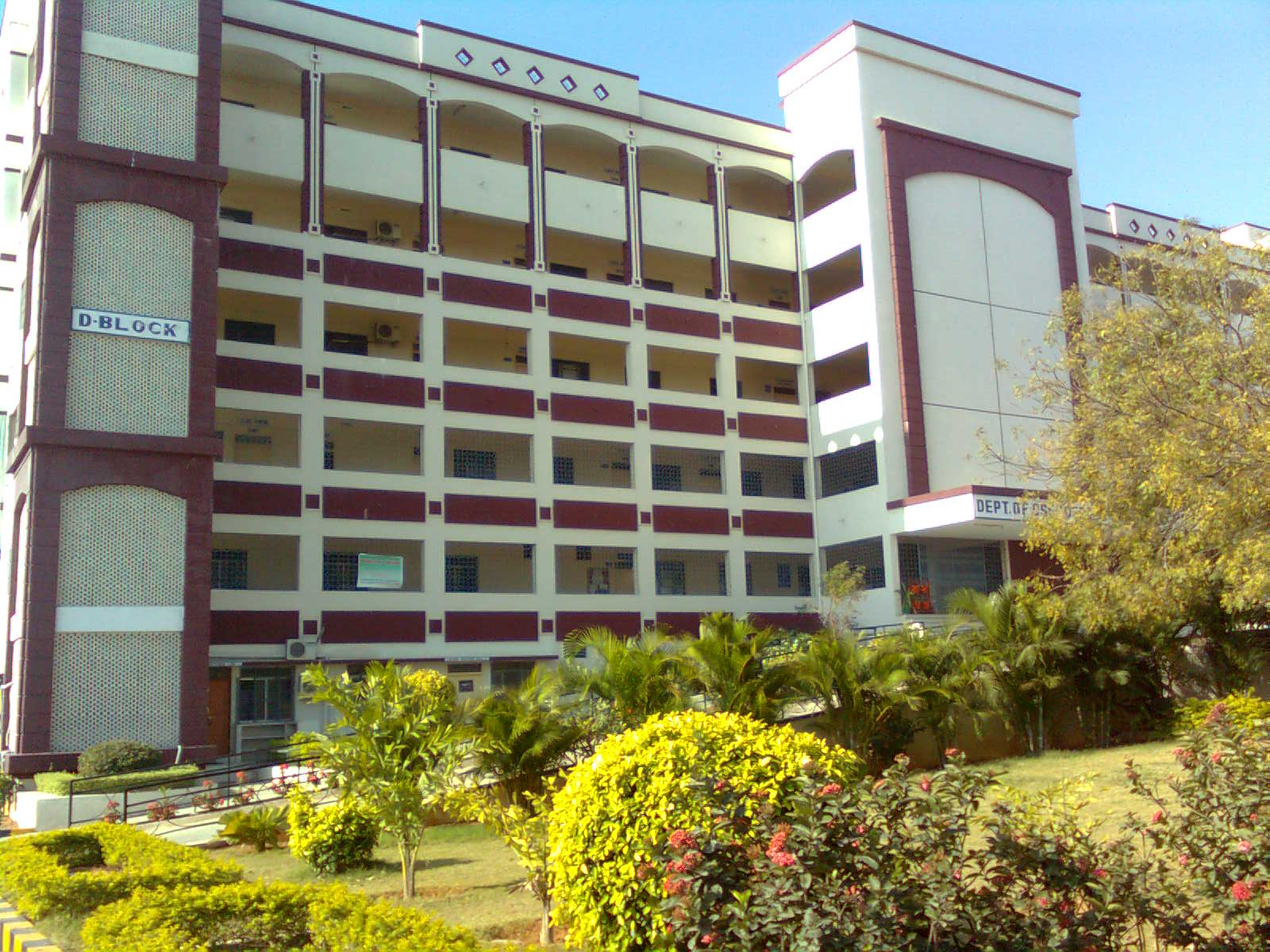
  CSE block
- Department of Electrical and Electronics Engineering
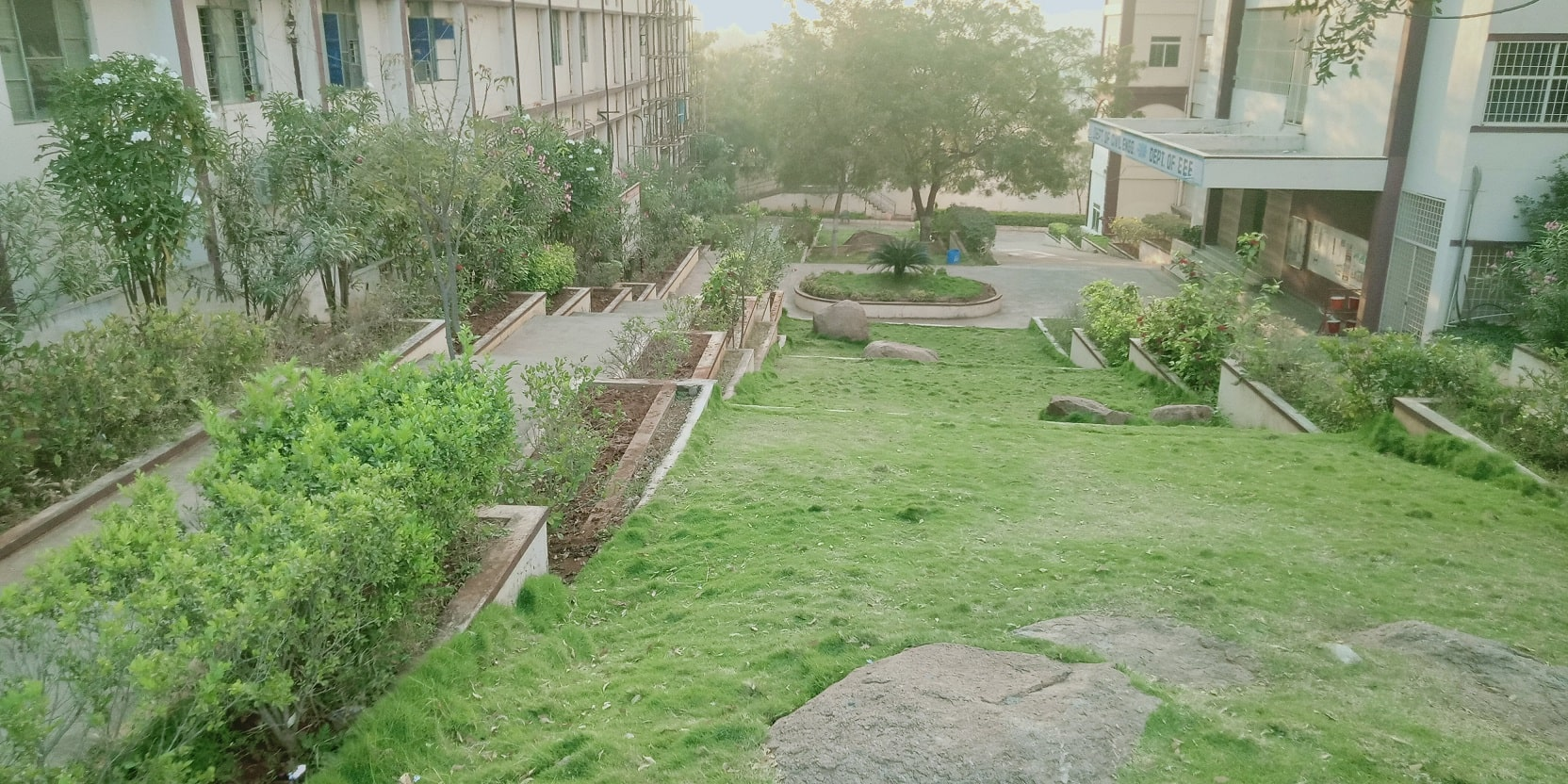
  EEE and Civil block
- Department of Electronics and Communication Engineering
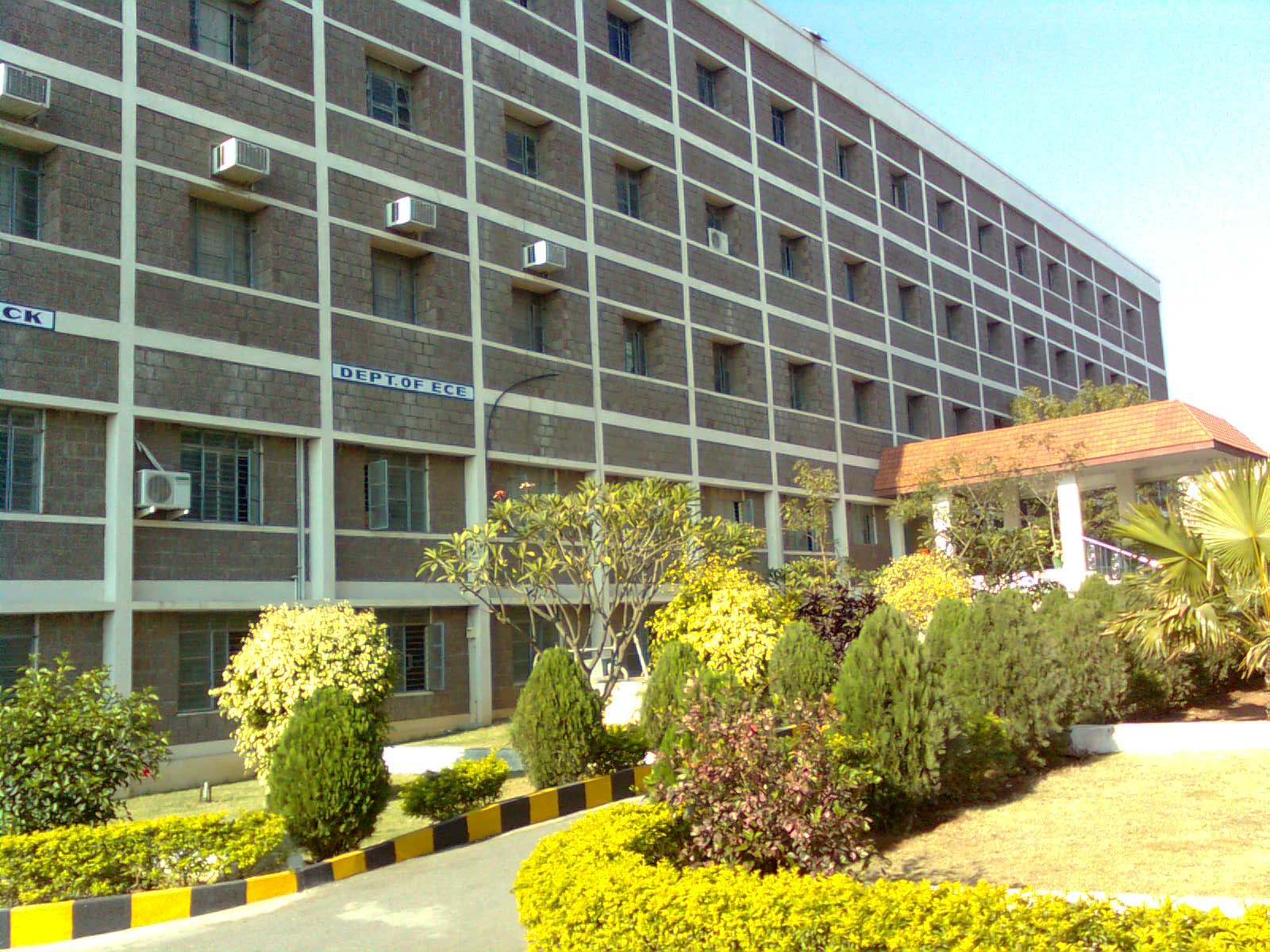
  ECE block
- Department of Mathematics and Humanities
- Department of Physics and Chemistry
- Department of Physical Education
- Department of Civil Engineering (started in 2010)
- Mechanical Engineering(MECH) (from the academic year 2012–2013)

== Department Heads and Faculty ==
- Department of Civil : Dr. K.V. Ramana Reddy (Head of the Department) and 18 Assistant Professors
- Department of Computer Science and Engineering : C. Ramesh Kumar Reddy (Head of the Department), 2 Professors,3 Sr Assistant Professors and 30 Assistant Professors

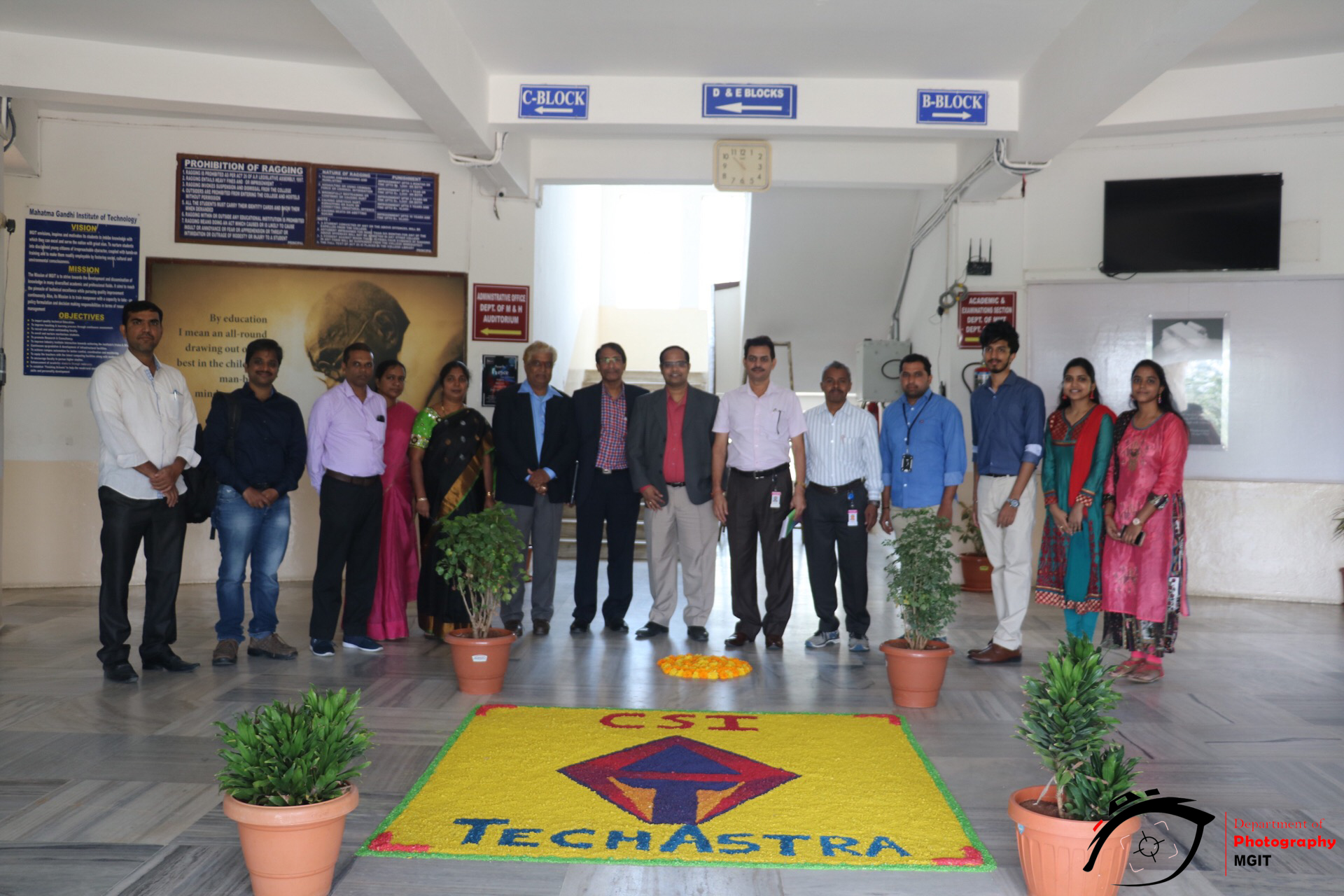
Techastra Event

== Annual Fests ==
Nirvana is organized by MGIT in March every year. It started in 2004. Musicians and DJs are invited to perform at the show.

- 2005 - Zero (Indian band) and Pin Drop Violence
- 2006 - Strings (band)
- 2007 - Prayag – Rock Band
- 2008 - Pritam
- 2009 - Motherjane and Junkyard Groove
- 2010 - Krishnakumar Kunnath
- 2011 - Ryan Beck (DJ)
- 2014 - Mika Singh official website nirvana 2014
- 2015 - Sravana Bhargavi
- 2016 - Sundeep Kishan
- 2017 - Saina Catherine
- 2018 - Chandra Bose(Writer)
- 2020 - Ramajogayya Sastry, Answer Music(DJ)

== Department Events ==
- MAGISTECH is an event organized by ISTE Students’ Chapter-MGIT which is held annually on 15 and 16 September. The event provides a platform for engineering students to interact and share their ideas with other students across the country. The themes of the paper presentation competition cover the entire spectrum of engineering and technology. Other major events include the Robotics competition and Tantra (a design competition in which a problem statement is given). This event is conducted as part of the celebrations of Engineers’ Day, the birthday of "Bharath Ratna Sir Mokshgundam Visvesvaraya".
- QUBIT is the annual technical fest of the Department of Computer Science. It is a prestigious technological event in the state with papers presented from all over the country. It has risen beyond its technical reach and incorporated cultural aspects with the introduction of LAN-Gaming, Treasure Hunts, Fun Stalls, etc. giving it an all-round reach. It is organized during the month of March right from the year of its inception without fail. It is a technical symposium for young minds and a meeting ground for tech-enthusiasts from around the country.
- MICROCOSM is the annual technical fest of the Department of Electronics and Communication Engineering.
- POTENZIA is the annual technical fest of Department of Electrical and Electronics Engineering.
- TECHNOVATION is the annual technical fest of the Department of Mechanical Engineering (Mechatronics).
- YUKTI is the annual technical fest of the Department of Information Technology.
- METALLON is the annual technical fest of the Department of Metallurgy and Materials Technology.
- CINFRA is the annual technical fest of the Department of Civil Engineering.
