= Suraj Singh =

Suraj Singh may refer to:

- Suraj Singh (1571–1619), ruler of Jodhpur-Marwar in India
- Suraj Singh (footballer) (active from 2014), Indian footballer
- Suraj Singh (wrestler), Indian-New Zealand wrestler
- Nahar Singh, fictional villain in the 1995 Indian film Karan Arjun, portrayed by Aasif Sheikh
