= Putra =

Putra (पुत्र') means child in Sanskrit.

Putra may also refer to:

== Places ==
- Putrajaya, the federal administrative centre of Malaysia
  - the Putra Bridge
  - Putra Mosque
- Putra Heights, a township in Selangor
- Putra Indoor Stadium, at Malaysian National Sports Complex
- Putra Komuter station
- Putra World Trade Centre, in Kuala Lumpur
- Projek Usahasama Transit Ringan Automatik (PUTRA) light rail transit, now called the Kelana Jaya Line
  - Terminal Putra LRT station
- Universiti Putra Malaysia, a top research university in Malaysia

== Other uses ==
- Putra (name), including a list of people with the name
- Putra (film), Kannada film
- Proton Putra, a Malaysian car brand
- Wisma Putra, another name for the Malaysian Ministry of Foreign Affairs
- Putra Post, a Malaysian tabloid newspaper
- Parti Bumiputera Perkasa Malaysia (PUTRA), a Malaysian nationalist political party
