= Trismelasmos minimus =

Scientific classification
- Domain: Eukaryota
- Kingdom: Animalia
- Phylum: Arthropoda
- Class: Insecta
- Order: Lepidoptera
- Family: Cossidae
- Genus: Trismelasmos
- Species: T. minimus

Binomial name
- Trismelasmos minimus (Houlbert, 1916)

Synonyms
- Xyleutes minimus Houlbert, 1916

Species of moth

Trismelasmos minimus is a moth in the family Cossidae. It lives in New Guinea, where it has been recorded from lowland and coastal areas of Papua, Papua New Guinea and the Bismarck Archipelago.
