= Trismelasmos shudra =

Scientific classification
- Kingdom: Animalia
- Phylum: Arthropoda
- Clade: Pancrustacea
- Class: Insecta
- Order: Lepidoptera
- Family: Cossidae
- Genus: Trismelasmos
- Species: T. shudra

Binomial name
- Trismelasmos shudra Yakovlev, 2011

Species of moth

Trismelasmos shudra is a moth in the family Cossidae. It was described by Yakovlev in 2011. It is found on the Moluccas.
