= Trismelasmos mixta =

Scientific classification
- Domain: Eukaryota
- Kingdom: Animalia
- Phylum: Arthropoda
- Class: Insecta
- Order: Lepidoptera
- Family: Cossidae
- Genus: Trismelasmos
- Species: T. mixta

Binomial name
- Trismelasmos mixta (Pagenstecher, 1888)

Synonyms
- Zeuzera mixta Pagenstecher, 1888

Species of moth

Trismelasmos mixta is a moth in the family Cossidae. It is found in New Guinea and on the Moluccas.
