= Telangana State Engineering Common Entrance Test =

Telangana Engineering Common Entrance Test
- Acronym: TG ECET
- Type: Online Standardized test
- Skills tested: Math, physics, chemistry, engineering
- Purpose: Admissions into Bachelor of Engineering, Bachelor of Technology, and Bachelor of Pharmacy programs
- Offered: Annually
- Fee: 900/- for others 500/- for ST/SC
- Website: tsecet.nic.in

Telangana Engineering Common Entrance Test (TGECET) is a standardized entrance examination for Diploma and B.Sc. Mathematics students to enter Bachelor of Engineering, Bachelor of Technology and Bachelor of Pharmacy programs in Telangana State, India. It is conducted by Jawaharlal Nehru Technological University, Hyderabad on behalf of Telangana State Council of Higher Education (TG ECET)

TS ECET 2020 exam is administered by Jawaharlal Nehru Technological University, Hyderabad across 14 regional centers in the states of Telangana and Andhra Pradesh. TS ECET 2020 was held on 31–08–2020. TS ECET 2022 was scheduled for 12 July 2022. However, due to heavy rains in Telangana, the TS ECET 2022 has been postponed. New dates will be shared soon.

== History ==
TS ECET was formerly ECET examination conducted by Andhra Pradesh until 2014 (before formation of Telangana on 2 June 2014).

ECET exam used to be conducted by Andhra Pradesh State Council of Higher Education administered by universities Jawaharlal Nehru Technological University, Kakinada and Jawaharlal Nehru Technological University, Hyderabad until 2014.

Later from 2015 it is conducted as TS ECET conducted by Telangana State Council of Higher Education and AP ECET by Andhrapradesh State Council of Higher Education.

== 2023 ==
The minimum prerequisites for taking the TSECET are:

- Diploma of Engineering, Diploma of Technology, Diploma of Pharmacy or equivalent, depending on the program applied for. A Bachelor of Science in Mathematics is also acceptable. Diplomas are accredited by the Telangana Board of Technical Education, with appropriate optional subjects or its equivalent.
- Needs to be born in Telangana State or Andhra Pradesh.
- Candidates who have acquired Diplomas in the Fields of Engineering, Technology or Pharmacy by enrolling into schools recognized by the All India Council for Technical Education are eligible to apply, and candidates who have a Bachelor of Science in Mathematics are also eligible to apply.
- 12th grade students are students are not eligible to apply as they don't possess either a Diploma Degree or Bachelor of Science in Mathematics
- Candidates should have earned a Diploma in one of the following areas of study: Engineering and Technology, Pharmacy or a B.Sc. Degree in Mathematics with at least 45% marks (40% in case of candidates belonging to reserved category {So, where is a list of the Reserved Categories?}) for entry into relevant courses.
- application fee of INR 500/-.

== Exam structure ==
The exam is structured differently for Engineering Stream and Pharmacy Stream. Within Engineering Stream, the exam format differs slightly between Diploma students and Bachelor of Science Math students.

=== Engineering stream ===
==== Diploma students exam pattern ====
Subjects for the Test	Marks	Remarks
Mathematics	50	Common for all branches
Physics	25	Common for all branches
Chemistry	25	Common for all branches
Engineering Paper (Civil / Electrical & Electronics / Mechanical / Electronics & Communication /Computer Science / Chemical / Metallurgical / Mining / Electronics & Instrumentation / Bio-Technology as the case may be)	100	Separate question paper for Each Branch of Diploma Engineering

Write a Mock test from official website to get detailed information on Online Examination.

==== Bachelor of Science in Mathematics students exam pattern ====
Subjects for the Test	Marks	Remarks
Mathematics	100	--
Analytical ability	50	--
Communicative English	50	--

=== Pharmacy stream ===
Diploma in Pharmacy students exam pattern

Subjects for the test	Marks	Remarks
Pharmaceutics	50	---
Pharmaceutical Chemistry	50	---
Pharmacognosy	50	---
Pharmacology and Toxicology	50	---

=== Qualifying marks ===
The qualifying percentage of marks for obtaining a rank in TS ECET exam is 25% of the aggregate marks in the four subjects for diploma students and three subjects for B.Sc. (Mathematics, i.e., 50 marks out of a total of 200. However, in the case of SC/ST candidates, there shall be no minimum qualifying marks for ranking the candidates. The rank obtained with the benefit of relaxation of the minimum qualifying marks at the TS ECET by any candidate claiming to belong to SC/ST category will be cancelled in case the claim is found to be invalid at the time of admission.

== Student ==
26,873 students attended TS-ECET in 2018

== Colleges ==
Most Engineering colleges in Telangana and Andhra Pradesh accept TSECET for admission of Diploma Students and B.Sc. maths Students into the Undergraduate programs.

List of colleges that accept TSECET for admission into 2nd year of undergraduate program are mentioned in TSECET website.

Example of colleges that accept the TSECET results for are Jawaharlal Nehru Technological University, Hyderabad, Osmania University, Chaitanya Bharathi Institute of Technology, Mahatma Gandhi Institute of Technology, Vasavi College of Engineering, Sreenidhi Institute of Science and Technology, Maturi Venkata Subba Rao Engineering College and so on.
