= Trismelasmos major =

Scientific classification
- Domain: Eukaryota
- Kingdom: Animalia
- Phylum: Arthropoda
- Class: Insecta
- Order: Lepidoptera
- Family: Cossidae
- Genus: Trismelasmos
- Species: T. major

Binomial name
- Trismelasmos major (Roepke, 1957)

Synonyms
- Xyleutes major Roepke, 1957

Species of moth

Trismelasmos major is a moth in the family Cossidae. It was described by Roepke in 1957. It is found on the Moluccas.
