= Trismelasmos floresi =

Scientific classification
- Domain: Eukaryota
- Kingdom: Animalia
- Phylum: Arthropoda
- Class: Insecta
- Order: Lepidoptera
- Family: Cossidae
- Genus: Trismelasmos
- Species: T. floresi

Binomial name
- Trismelasmos floresi Yakovlev, 2011

Species of moth

Trismelasmos floresi is a moth in the family Cossidae. It was described by Yakovlev in 2011. It is found on Flores, Sumbawa, Timor and Lombok.
