= Trismelasmos soma =

Scientific classification
- Kingdom: Animalia
- Phylum: Arthropoda
- Clade: Pancrustacea
- Class: Insecta
- Order: Lepidoptera
- Family: Cossidae
- Genus: Trismelasmos
- Species: T. soma

Binomial name
- Trismelasmos soma Yakovlev, 2011

Species of moth

Trismelasmos soma is a moth in the family Cossidae, described by Yakovlev in 2011 from Sulawesi.
