= Trismelasmos albicans =

Scientific classification
- Domain: Eukaryota
- Kingdom: Animalia
- Phylum: Arthropoda
- Class: Insecta
- Order: Lepidoptera
- Family: Cossidae
- Genus: Trismelasmos
- Species: T. albicans

Binomial name
- Trismelasmos albicans (Roepke, 1955)

Synonyms
- Xyleutes albicans Roepke, 1955

Species of moth

Trismelasmos albicans is a moth in the family Cossidae. It was described by Roepke in 1955. It is found in New Guinea.
