= Trismelasmos =

Scientific classification
- Kingdom: Animalia
- Phylum: Arthropoda
- Clade: Pancrustacea
- Class: Insecta
- Order: Lepidoptera
- Family: Cossidae
- Subfamily: Zeuzerinae
- Genus: Trismelasmos; Schoorl, 1990

Genus of moths

Trismelasmos is a genus of moths in the family Cossidae.

== Species ==
- Trismelasmos agni Yakovlev, 2011
- Trismelasmos albicans (Roepke, 1955)
- Trismelasmos ardzhuna Yakovlev, 2011
- Trismelasmos arfakensis Yakovlev, 2011
- Trismelasmos brechlini Yakovlev, 2011
- Trismelasmos chakra Yakovlev, 2011
- Trismelasmos cinerosa (Roepke, 1955)
- Trismelasmos dejongi Schoorl, 2001
- Trismelasmos drago Yakovlev, 2011
- Trismelasmos draupadi Yakovlev, 2011
- Trismelasmos elegans (Roepke, 1955)
- Trismelasmos euphanes (West, 1932)
- Trismelasmos floresi Yakovlev, 2011
- Trismelasmos indra Yakovlev, 2011
- Trismelasmos jordani (Roepke, 1955)
- Trismelasmos kalisi Yakovlev, 2011
- Trismelasmos kunti Yakovlev, 2011
- Trismelasmos maculatus (Snellen, 1879) (=Xyleutes pygmaea Roepke, 1957)
- Trismelasmos magellani Yakovlev, 2006
- Trismelasmos major (Roepke, 1957)
- Trismelasmos mindanao Yakovlev, 2011
- Trismelasmos minimus (Houlbert, 1916)
- Trismelasmos mixta (Pagenstecher, 1888)
- Trismelasmos nakula Yakovlev, 2011
- Trismelasmos pandu Yakovlev, 2011
- Trismelasmos papuana (Roepke, 1955)
- Trismelasmos papuasi Yakovlev, 2011
- Trismelasmos peleng Yakovlev, 2011
- Trismelasmos sinyaevi Yakovlev, 2011
- Trismelasmos shudra Yakovlev, 2011
- Trismelasmos snowensis Yakovlev, 2011
- Trismelasmos soma Yakovlev, 2011
- Trismelasmos suriya Yakovlev, 2011
- Trismelasmos tectorius (Swinhoe, 1901)
- Trismelasmos valentini Yakovlev, 2011
- Trismelasmos varuna Yakovlev, 2011
- Trismelasmos vulkani Yakovlev, 2011

== Former species ==
- Trismelasmos dictyograpta (Roepke, 1957)
- Trismelasmos robinson Yakovlev, 2004

== Etymology ==
The genus name is derived from Greek tris (meaning thrice) and melasmos (meaning a blackening).
