= Trismelasmos jordani =

Scientific classification
- Domain: Eukaryota
- Kingdom: Animalia
- Phylum: Arthropoda
- Class: Insecta
- Order: Lepidoptera
- Family: Cossidae
- Genus: Trismelasmos
- Species: T. jordani

Binomial name
- Trismelasmos jordani (Roepke, 1955)

Synonyms
- Xyleutes jordani Roepke, 1955

Species of moth

Trismelasmos jordani is a moth in the family Cossidae. It was described by Roepke in 1955. It is found in New Guinea. The habitat consists of areas at moderate and higher altitudes.
