= Trismelasmos tectorius =

Scientific classification
- Kingdom: Animalia
- Phylum: Arthropoda
- Class: Insecta
- Order: Lepidoptera
- Family: Cossidae
- Genus: Trismelasmos
- Species: T. tectorius

Binomial name
- Trismelasmos tectorius (Swinhoe, 1901)

Synonyms
- Duomitus tectorius Swinhoe, 1901

Species of moth

Trismelasmos tectorius is a moth in the family Cossidae. It is found in New Guinea and on the Solomon Islands.
