= Trismelasmos elegans =

Scientific classification
- Kingdom: Animalia
- Phylum: Arthropoda
- Clade: Pancrustacea
- Class: Insecta
- Order: Lepidoptera
- Family: Cossidae
- Genus: Trismelasmos
- Species: T. elegans

Binomial name
- Trismelasmos elegans (Roepke, 1955)

Synonyms
- Xyleutes elegans Roepke, 1955

Species of moth

Trismelasmos elegans is a moth in the family Cossidae. It was described by Roepke in 1955. It is found in New Guinea. The species seems to prefer lowland areas.
