= Trismelasmos magellani =

Scientific classification
- Kingdom: Animalia
- Phylum: Arthropoda
- Clade: Pancrustacea
- Class: Insecta
- Order: Lepidoptera
- Family: Cossidae
- Genus: Trismelasmos
- Species: T. magellani

Binomial name
- Trismelasmos magellani Yakovlev, 2006

Species of moth

Trismelasmos magellani is a moth in the family Cossidae. It was described by Yakovlev in 2006. It is found in New Guinea.

The length of the forewings is about 22 mm.

== Etymology ==
The species is named in honour of Ferdinand Magellan.
