= Suryaa =

Suryaa may refer to:

- Suryaa (newspaper), an Indian Telugu-language newspaper
- Suryaa: An Awakening, a 1989 Indian Hindi-language film directed by Esmayeel Shroff

== See also ==
- Suriya (disambiguation)
- Surya (disambiguation)
