= Charoen Nakhon Road =

Road in Bangkok, Thailand

Coordinates: 13.712626°N 100.49775°E

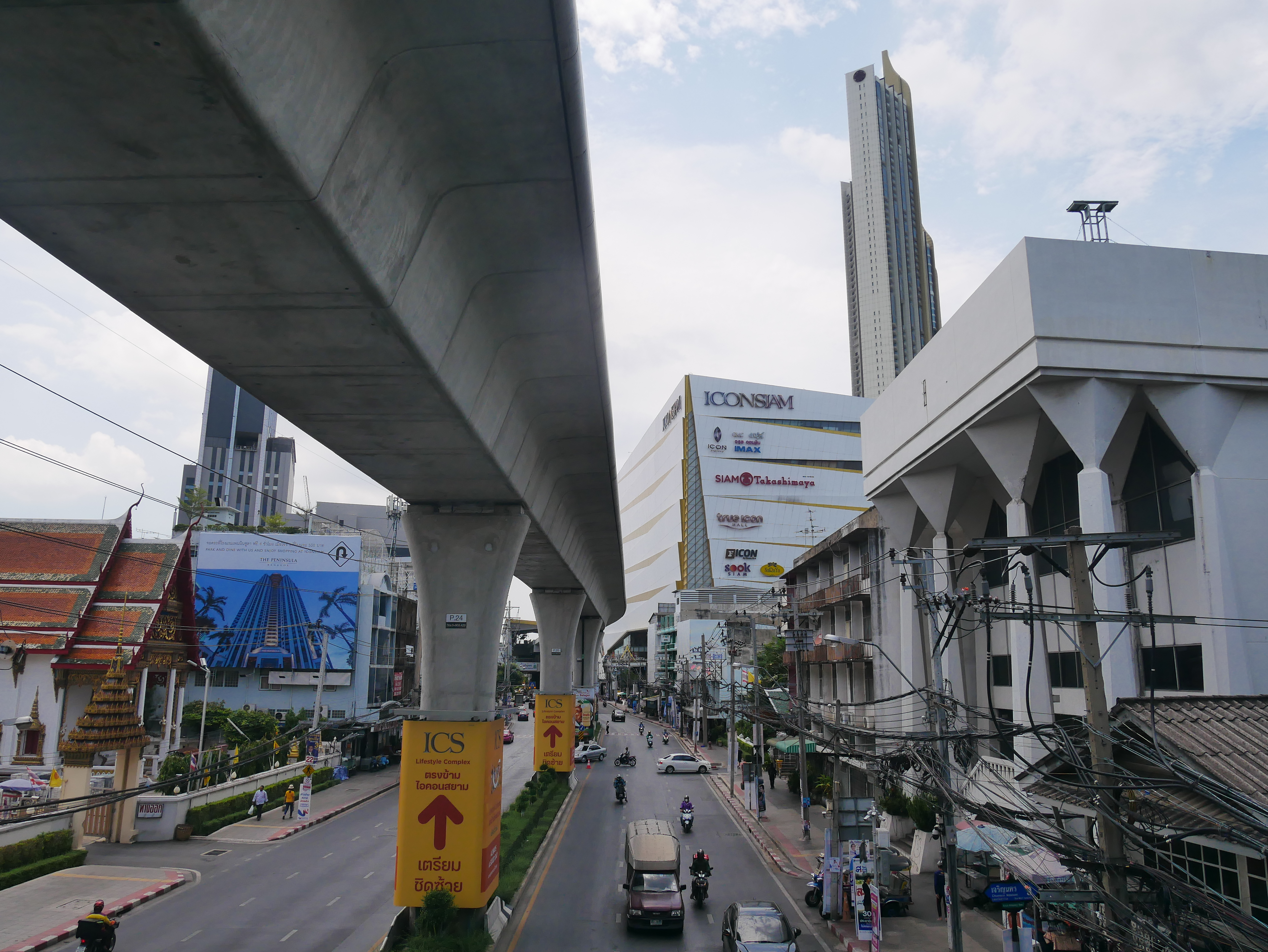
Charoen Nakhon Road near Iconsiam and Wat Suwannaphumi.

Charoen Nakhon Road (Thai: ถนนเจริญนคร, pronounced [t͡ɕā.rɤ̄ːn nà.kʰɔ̄ːn]) is a street on the Thonburi side, the western bank of the Chao Phraya River, in Bangkok.

== Background ==
It begins at the Khlong San Junction in Khlong San District, in front of the Khlong San District Office. It branches off from Lat Ya Road, which comes from the Wongwian Yai, as well as from Somdet Chao Phraya Road. The road curves southward, running parallel to the Chao Phraya River, and has a total length of 4.9 km (3.0 mi). It ends at Charoen Nakhon 8 Bridge in Thon Buri District, continuing onward as Ratsadon Buran Road.

It is considered one of the main roads in Khlong San District. Its early section intersects with Charoen Rat Road, which was originally part of the Mahachai Railway line from Pak Khlong San railway station, the starting station, to Wongwian Yai railway station. However, Pak Khlong San railway station was demolished in 1961, and although the railway tracks were not removed, they were covered and converted into a road. As a result, the Mahachai Railway line now officially begins at Wongwian Yai railway station up to the present day.

The road was constructed around 1939 to 1940 under the initiative of Phraya Mahaisawan (Kor Sombatsiri), Mayor of Thonburi Municipality. Upon completion, it was named Charoen Nakhon Road to complement Charoen Krung Road on the Phra Nakhon side, or the eastern bank of the Chao Phraya River, running parallel to the river. Both roads share a name with the same meaning "the road of the city's prosperity."

The road passes several important landmarks, including the Khlong San District Office, Taksin Hospital, Iconsiam, and numerous luxury riverside hotels along the Chao Phraya River. Since the end of 2020, the BTS Gold Line has also been operating along the entire length of the road.

In 2025, Time Out ranked Charoen Nakhon Road as the 26th coolest street out of 31 streets worldwide. The reason given was that today, this once-quiet riverside stretch has become a creative hub that captures the best of both old and new Bangkok.
