= Suriya Coffee =

Suriya Coffee สุริยากาแฟ

Restaurant information
- Established: 1918; 1942 (officially)
- Owner: Winai "Chai" Lertthaninwanit

Suriya Coffee (Thai: สุริยากาแฟ) is a traditional coffeehouse in a kopitiam style in Bangkok's Thonburi side. It is considered an old coffee shop having a history of more than 100 years.

== History ==
It was founded by Ngow Sae-lim (林五) Teochew immigrants in 1918, starting as a street vendor in Talat Phlu area and later opened as a shophouse in the current location of Wat Klang Market around 1942. His café was locally known as "Ngow Jak Coffee Shop" (ร้านกาแฟโหงวเจ็ก, "uncle Ngow's café"). After his death in 1954, his two sons took over the business.

In 1965, the Wat Klang Market was renovated, so the coffee shop moved to its current location, which was the first branch, under the Ratchadaphisek bridge.

The reason for using the name "Suriya" (Note: The coffee shop derives its name from the Hindu solar deity Surya.) was because at that time it was a tradition for Talat Phlu folks to organize a tour during the Chinese New Year festival according to ancient Chinese tradition. The two brothers who owned and run the coffee shop, Wichai "Tue" and Winai "Chai" Lertthaninwanit, were the leaders of the tour group, using the name "Suriya Tour".

== Branch ==
At present, Suriya Coffee has three branches as follows:

- Under the Ratchadaphisek bridge in Talat Phlu, the first branch
- Inside the Wat Klang Market by the Khlong Bangkok Yai, second branch opened in 2003 (Note: Although it is the second branch, the location is in the starting point of the business.)
- On the Charoen Rat road next to defunct movie theatre Hawaii near Wongwian Yai
