= Suryavamsam =

Suryavamsam may refer to:

- Solar dynasty, a dynasty in Indian mythology

== Films ==
- Sooryavamsham (film), 1975 Indian Malayalam-language film
- Surya Vamsam (1997 film), 1997 Indian Tamil-language film
- Suryavamsam (1998 film), 1998 Indian Telugu-language film by Bhimaneni Srinivasa Rao
- Sooryavansham, 1999 Indian Hindi-language film by E. V. V. Satyanarayana
- Suryavamsha (film), 1999 Kannada-language film by S. Narayan

== Television series ==
- Suryavamsam (TV series), 2020 Indian Tamil-language TV series

== See also ==
- Suryavanshi (disambiguation)
- Suryavamsi Gajapati dynasty, dynasty in medieval eastern India
