= Trismelasmos arfakensis =

Scientific classification
- Kingdom: Animalia
- Phylum: Arthropoda
- Clade: Pancrustacea
- Class: Insecta
- Order: Lepidoptera
- Family: Cossidae
- Genus: Trismelasmos
- Species: T. arfakensis

Binomial name
- Trismelasmos arfakensis Yakovlev, 2011

Species of moth

Trismelasmos arfakensis is a moth in the family Cossidae. It was described by Yakovlev in 2011. It is found in New Guinea, where it has been recorded from Irian Jaya.
