= Charoen Rat Road =

Road in Bangkok, Thailand

Coordinates: 13°43′33.97″N 100°30′4.41″E

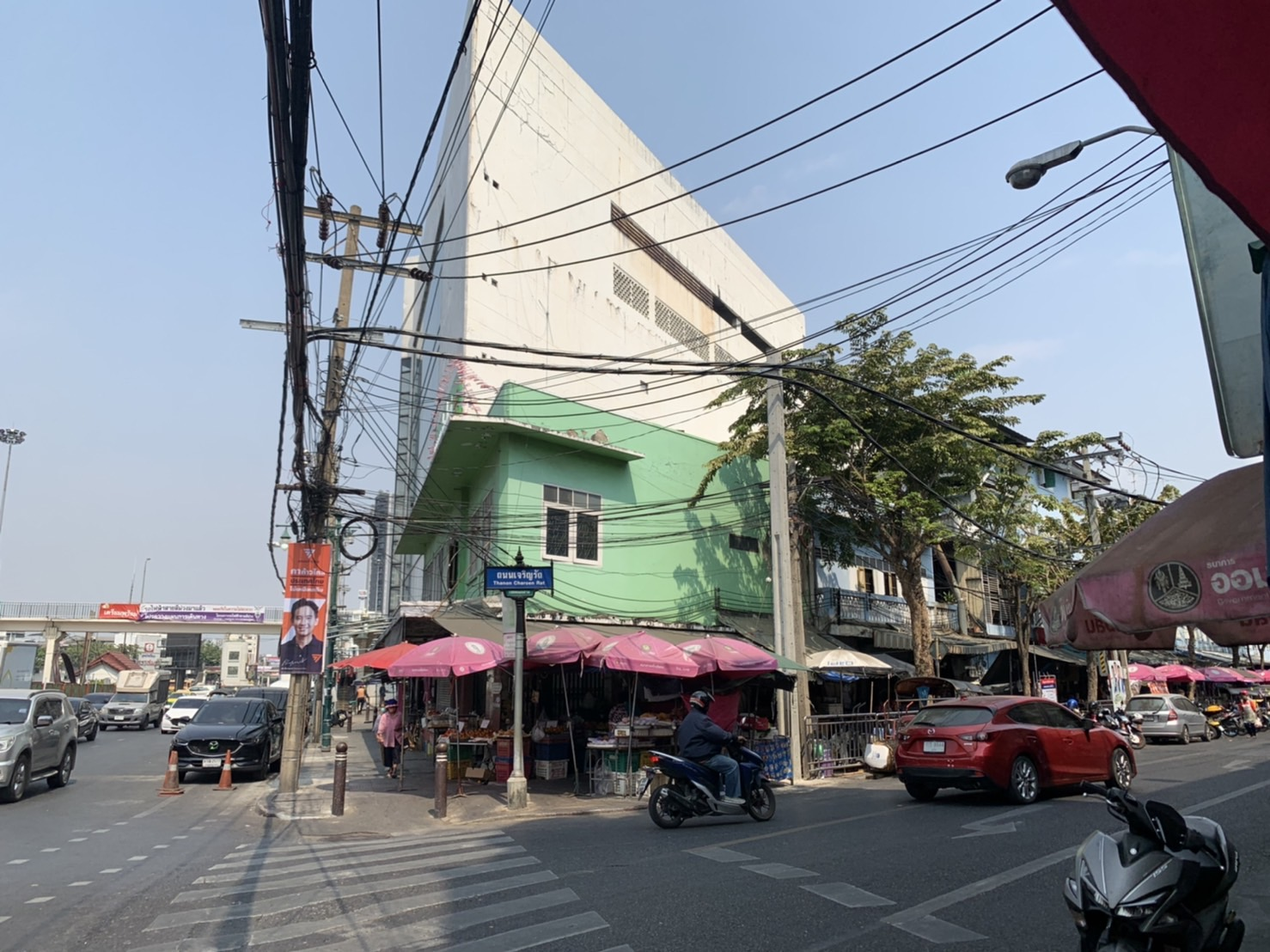
The beginning of the road where Wongwian Yai market or Charoen Rat market is located

Charoen Rat Road (Thai: ถนนเจริญรัถ, RTGS: Thanon Charoen Rat, pronounced [tʰā.nǒn t͡ɕā.rɤ̄ːn rát]) is a road in Bangkok's Thonburi side. It serves as a "soi" or alleyway connecting Somdet Phra Chao Tak Sin Road and Charoen Nakhon Road. It passes through and overlaps between Khlong San and Khlong Ton Sai sub-districts within the Khlong San district on the Thonburi side of the Bangkok, near the Chao Phraya River, which is one of the most important waterways in the city. On the side of the road near Wongwian Yai is beginning with the Wongwian Yai Market, one of the largest fresh markets in the Thonburi side of Bangkok. In the following area, it is a well-known center for the type of business and the road continues on to end at the intersection of Charoen Nakhon Road, which is a commercial center known as Iconsiam and a pier for crossing the river to the Phra Nakhon side. It also connects to the nearby areas of Talad Noi and Captain Bush Lane (Charoenkrung Soi 30), which is an old and historic area.

Charoen Rat Road was originally a Maeklong railway line that began at the Wongwian Yai Station and ended at the Pak Khlong San Station. However, during the government of the Field Marsha Sarit Thanarat, the station and railway track was dismantled, and developed to make way for the road and bus stops that exists today.

Charoen Rat Road is considered a center for leather goods shops in Bangkok. The area is known for its wide selection of leather products, including shoes, bags, belts, and other accessories. Many shops in the area specialize in creating bespoke, handmade leather items of high quality, which has contributed to the street's reputation as a prime destination for shoppers seeking leather goods. The availability of various shops and stores has made Charoen Rat Road a vital commercial center in Bangkok's retail industry.

== History ==
Originally, throughout the length of the road, used to be the Maeklong railway line, ran from the Mahachai station in Samut Songkhram Province as far as to the terminal station of Pak Khlong San station which used to be located on the inactive Khlongsan Plaza market (due to the expiration of the land lease agreement with the SRT in 2020). During the time of Field Marshal Sarit Thanarat's government in 1961, the terminal station of Pak Khlong San station in Maeklong railway line was dismantled and changed the terminal station to Talat Phlu Station, but with the local claiming that the products could not be brought into Phra Nakhon district. Therefore, the railway line became operated as Wongwian Yai station in the Wongwian Yai quarter instead.

As for the Pak Khlong San station was dismantled, the railway was filled in to make way for the road and bus stops, to ease traffic congestion in Bangkok by connecting between Somdet Phrachao Taksin Road and Charoen Nakhon Road. The road still shows traces of having been a railway track before, as seen from the middle of the road surface. The narrow condition of the road along the railway zone in the past is also still evident.

Charoen Rat Road served as a large wholesale area for more than 30 years until equipment from China and untanned leather from Thailand began to be imported by Chinese investors. At present, Charoen Rat Road has many Chinese leather shops and products in storefronts on both sides of the road.

== Places ==
Charoen Rat Road runs for 1.8 kilometres (1.1 mi) in-between the Sub-districts (Khwaeng) of Khlong San and Khlong Ton Sai. Charoen Rat Road is located on the Thonburi side. Around Wongwian Yai area. It begins at Somdet Phra Chao Tak Sin Road, at the corners of the Wongwian Yai Market, Ngernvichit market and Sesavej Market. It heads east through the Charoen Nakhon Road, crossing the place of Iconsiam. The inner road is passes through another road of Lat Ya, crossing the place of Platform Wongwian Yai and Krung Thon Buri, passes the Wongwian Yai BTS station.

The starting point of the road crosses Wongwian Yai which is the memorial site of the King Taksin Monument. From here, it serves the Wongwian Yai Market, running east, roughly parallel to the road. Along the way, It passes the historic Hawaii Cinema near the alleyway of Krung Thon Buri and Lat Ya Road, as well as the Thonburi Full Gospel Church. The inside of the road is a source of leather goods, fabric and artificial leather such as PU and PVC which is also including the products of shoes, belts and accessories such as zippers, chains, beads. The middle point of the road, it serves variety of delicious food options which mostly opening in late afternoon to the night of the day. There are also plenty of street food vendors and small restaurants serving up a variety of Thai dishes, including som tam (papaya salad), pad thai, and khao pad (fried rice). The road continues straight until it meets Charoen Nakhon Road at Klongsan Plaza Market, which it's closed in 2021.

The most convenient way to get to Charoen Rat Road is to take the BTS Skytrain to Wongwian Yai Station, exit at gate 3 and walk or take a motorcycle taxi into Soi Krung Thonburi 1 for about 400 meters (1,312 ft) until you reach the intersection with Charoen Rat Road. However, it is hard and inconvenient to use private car to go through the road due to the road have car parking on both sides of the road. In addition, there are many cars running in the opposite direction all the time. The surrounding area of Charoen Rat Road has very limited parking space, so it is recommended to use public transportation as the best option.

== Building and Architecture ==
=== Marketplace ===
Wongwian Yai Market is a small market offering a wide variety of seafood and fresh ingredients. It is best to take the BTS subway system because transportation in the road becomes congested in the late afternoon.

Ngernvichit market is a small market which located opposite of Wongwian Yai Market. Mainly, it is selling fresh foods such as vegetables, fruits, sweets, prepared foods Consumer.

Sesavej Market is a smallest market in the road which located next to the Ngernvichit market. Mostly it is selling same as the Ngernvichit market such as fresh food and Ready-to-eat foods.

=== Shophouse ===
Most of the buildings along Charoen Rat Road are used as commercial and residential spaces. These buildings are located on both sides of the road and are typically 3–4 stories high. The ground floors are often used as retail spaces which is known as the largest and most comprehensive retail and wholesale center for fabrics and materials used in the production of bags in Thailand. This street has been popular among both small and large bag manufacturers in the country's industry for many decades. For the upper floors are used as residential areas for the local residents.

=== Old building ===
The Hawaii Theater located near the BTS Wongwian Yai line S8 exit 3, The Hawaii Cinema was opened in 1973 as a single-screen cinema with 1,860 seats in the orchestra and balcony levels. It was operated by the New York Cinema Company, which also operated the Scala and Siam theaters. It was renamed from Wongwian Yai Rama in 1980. Currently, the theater has been converted into a restaurant and parking lot.

Thai Rama Theater was built in 1969 and was used as an independent cinema in the past. Currently, this theater has been closed down and turned into a shaded parking area in 2009.

=== Places of worship ===
Thonburi Full Gospel Church is a church affiliated with Christian Fellowships of Thailand.
