= Trismelasmos dejongi =

Scientific classification
- Kingdom: Animalia
- Phylum: Arthropoda
- Clade: Pancrustacea
- Class: Insecta
- Order: Lepidoptera
- Family: Cossidae
- Genus: Trismelasmos
- Species: T. dejongi

Binomial name
- Trismelasmos dejongi Schoorl, 2001

Species of moth

Trismelasmos dejongi is a moth in the family Cossidae. It is found on the Moluccas.
