= Trismelasmos maculatus =

Scientific classification
- Kingdom: Animalia
- Phylum: Arthropoda
- Class: Insecta
- Order: Lepidoptera
- Family: Cossidae
- Genus: Trismelasmos
- Species: T. maculatus

Binomial name
- Trismelasmos maculatus (Snellen, 1879)

Synonyms
- Cossus maculatus Snellen, 1879; Xyleutes maculatus overbeecki Draeseke, 1936; Xyleutes pygmaea Roepke, 1957

Species of moth

Trismelasmos maculatus is a moth in the family Cossidae. It is found on Java and Sulawesi and in Australia.

== Subspecies ==
- Trismelasmos maculatus maculatus (Sulawesi)
- Trismelasmos maculatus overbeecki (Draeseke, 1936) (Java)
