= Trismelasmos cinerosa =

Scientific classification
- Domain: Eukaryota
- Kingdom: Animalia
- Phylum: Arthropoda
- Class: Insecta
- Order: Lepidoptera
- Family: Cossidae
- Genus: Trismelasmos
- Species: T. cinerosa

Binomial name
- Trismelasmos cinerosa (Roepke, 1955)

Synonyms
- Xyleutes cinerosa Roepke, 1955

Species of moth

Trismelasmos cinerosa is a moth in the family Cossidae. It was described by Roepke in 1955. It is found in New Guinea. The habitat consists of both lowland and mountainous areas.
