= Surya (disambiguation) =

Surya is the chief solar deity in Hinduism. It is also a common name given for people of South Asia.

- Suryavamsha (Solar dynasty) is a prominent dynasty in Hindu mythology.

== Notable people ==
- Surya Bahadur Thapa (born 1928), Prime Minister of Nepal five times, under three different kings
- Surya Bonaly (born 1973), French-American professional figure skater
- Suryavarman, was King of the Khmer Empire
- Surya Das (born 1950), American Buddhist lama
- Surya Rau Bahadur, was Maharajah of Pithapuram
- Suriya (born 1975), an Indian Tamil actor
- Surya was an alias of Indrajit Gupta
- Surya (Telugu actor), an Indian Telugu actor known for his villainous roles
- Suryadeva Yajvan, 12th-13th century writer
- Surya Sen, an Indian revolutionary

== Other ==
- Surya (2004 film), an Indian Bengali film
- Surya (2008 film), an Indian Tamil-language action film
- Surya (2023 film), an Indian Marathi-language action drama film
- Surya (river), a river in Perm Krai, Russia
- Surya TV, a Malayalam-language Indian television channel
- Surya Siddhanta, a treatise of Indian astronomy
- Surya (missile), an intercontinental ballistic missile
- Suryaraopeta, a census town in East Godavari district, Andhra Pradesh
- Surya, a brand of clove cigarette (kretek) by Gudang Garam

== See also ==
- Suria (disambiguation)
- Suriya (disambiguation)
- Sariya (disambiguation)
- Soraya (disambiguation)
- Suryaa (disambiguation)
- Sooryan (disambiguation)
- Suryanarayana (disambiguation)
- Suryaputra (disambiguation)
- Suryavanshi (disambiguation)
- Suraj (disambiguation)
