= Trismelasmos papuana =

Scientific classification
- Kingdom: Animalia
- Phylum: Arthropoda
- Clade: Pancrustacea
- Class: Insecta
- Order: Lepidoptera
- Family: Cossidae
- Genus: Trismelasmos
- Species: T. papuana

Binomial name
- Trismelasmos papuana (Roepke, 1955)

Synonyms
- Xyleutes papuana Roepke, 1955

Species of moth

Trismelasmos papuana is a moth in the family Cossidae. It was described by Roepke in 1955. It is found in New Guinea, where it has been recorded from Papua, Papua New Guinea and the Dampier Archipelago.

The wings have a pale (often white) ground colour.
