= Sooryan =

Sooryan may refer to:

- Sooryan (1982 film), Indian Malayalam film directed by J. Sasikumar
- Sooryan (2007 film), Indian Malayalam film directed by V. M. Vinu

== See also ==
- Surya (disambiguation)
