= Trismelasmos euphanes =

Scientific classification
- Domain: Eukaryota
- Kingdom: Animalia
- Phylum: Arthropoda
- Class: Insecta
- Order: Lepidoptera
- Family: Cossidae
- Genus: Trismelasmos
- Species: T. euphanes

Binomial name
- Trismelasmos euphanes (West, 1932)

Synonyms
- Xyleutes euphanes West, 1932; Trismelasmos robinson Yakovlev, 2004

Species of moth

Trismelasmos euphanes is a moth in the family Cossidae. It is found in New Guinea and the Philippines.
