= Motherjane =

Indian Rock Band

- Origin: Kochi, Kerala, India
- Genres: Rock, progressive rock, world, Carnatic music
- Years active: 1996–present
- Members: Suraj Mani; Baiju Dharmajan; Deepu Sasidharan; Allan Santosh; Alloy Francis
- Past members: John Thomas; Clyde Rozario; Santhosh Chandran; Rex Vijayan; Laji; Biju Peter; Mithun Raju; Deepak Dev; Nithin Vijayanath; Vivek Thomas; George Joseph
- Website: www.motherjane.in

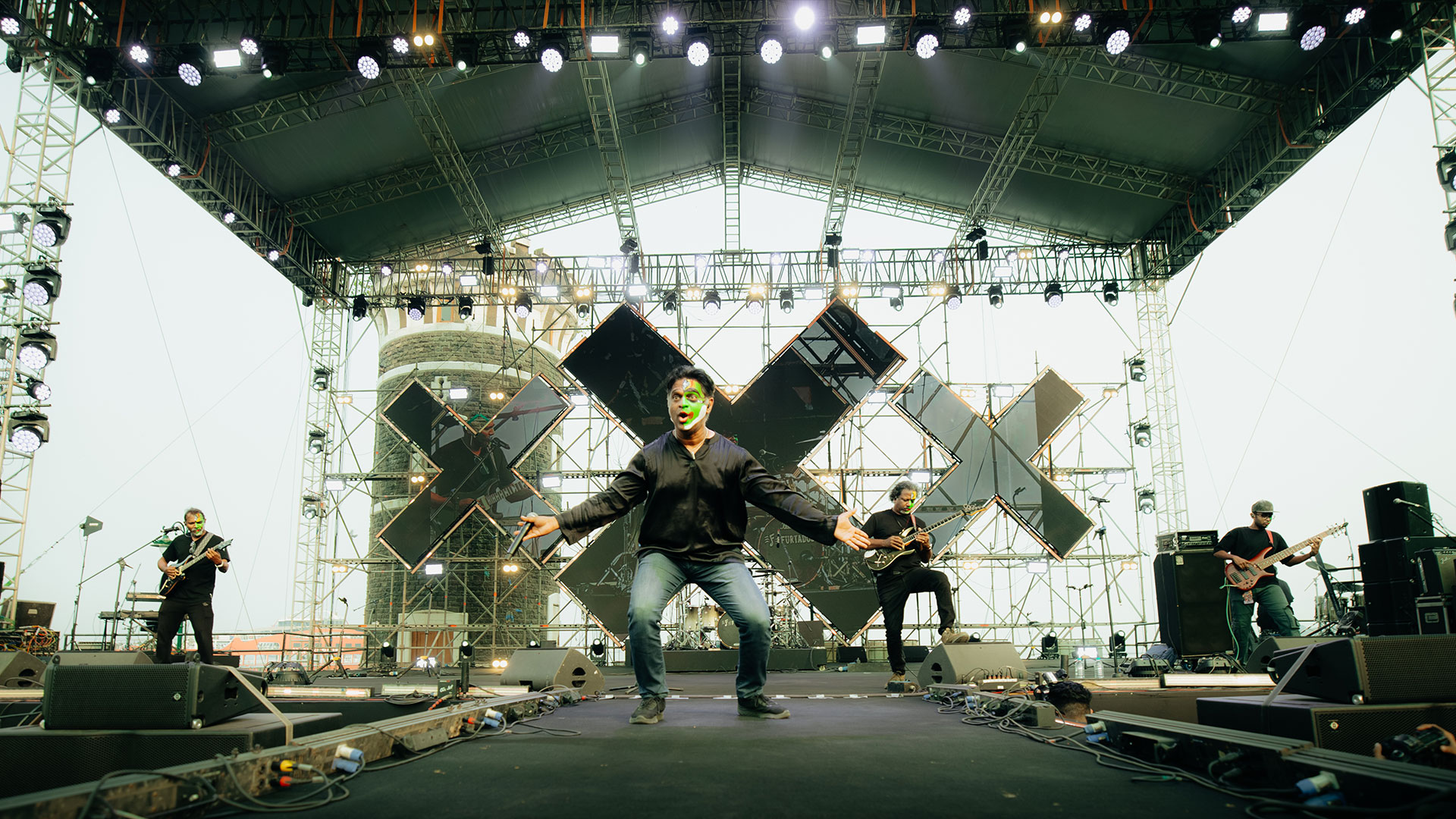
Motherjane Live at Mahindra Independence Rock Music Festival 2024, Mumbai

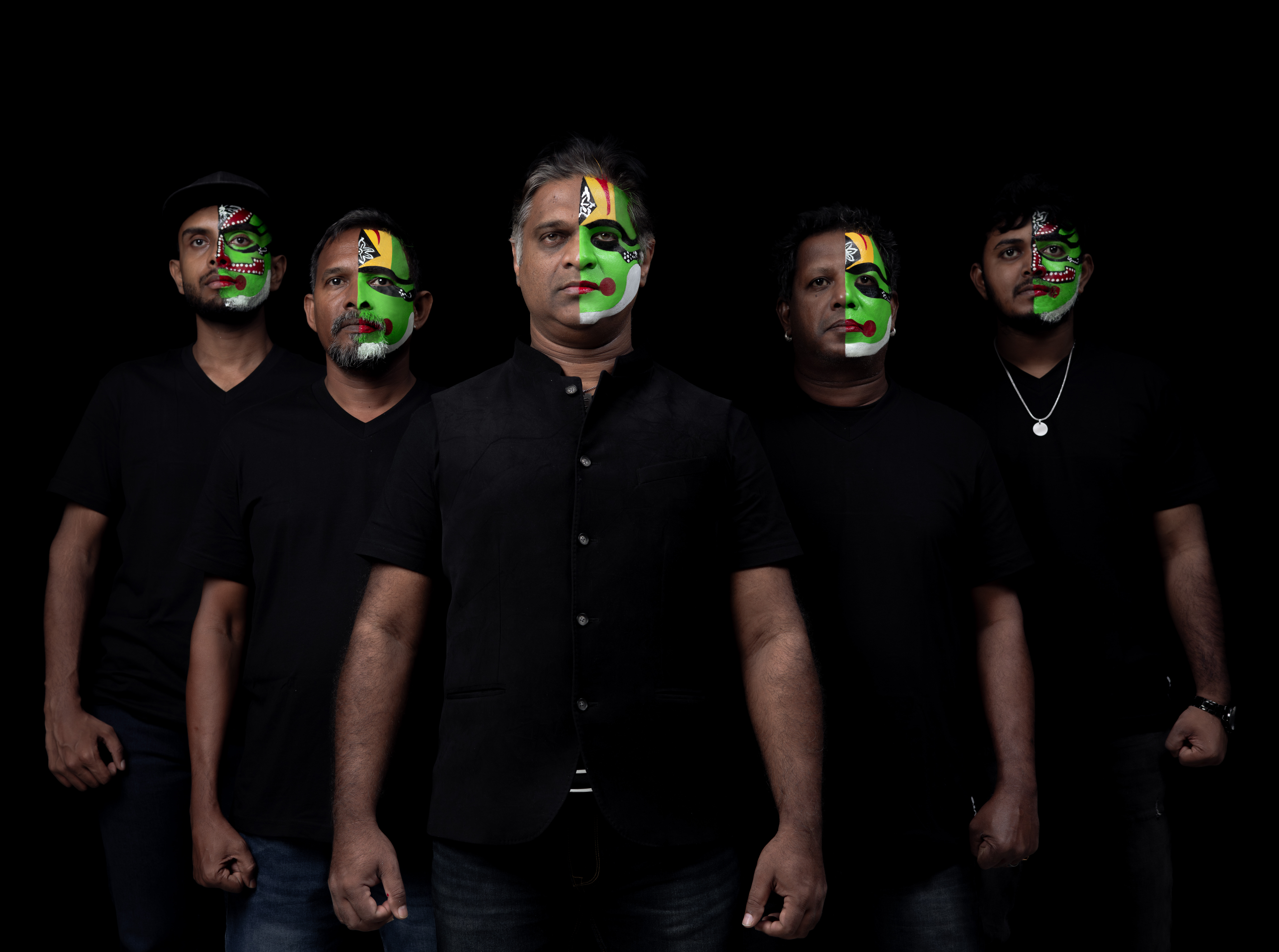
Current Line up of Motherjane: (Left to right) Alan Santosh, Deepu Sasidharan, Suraj Mani, Baiju Dharmajan, Alloy Francis

Motherjane is an Indian rock band formed in 1996 in Kochi, Kerala. Known for blending progressive rock with Carnatic and world-music influences, the band is regarded as one of India’s most iconic and influential contemporary rock acts. Motherjane rose to national prominence in the 2000s with their debut album Insane Biography (2002) and their critically acclaimed follow-up Maktub (2008), which received multiple national awards and established the group as pioneers of Indian fusion rock.

== History ==
=== 1991–2000: Formation ===
Motherjane was formed in 1996 in Kochi, Kerala, by drummer John Thomas, guitarist Mithun Raju and bassist Clyde Rozario to fill in for a band that backed out of a college festival at St. Albert’s College, Kochi. The initial lineup included Thomas (drums), Rozario (bass), Raju (guitars), and vocalists Laji and Nirmal David. Laji soon left, and the band continued as an instrumental group.

Around 1999, original lead guitarist Mithun Raju left and was replaced by Baiju Dharmajan. In 2000, Suraj Mani, who had performed with Bangalore-based rock acts, joined Motherjane as vocalist after meeting the band at Ancient Mariner, Kochi, and wrote the band’s original songs starting with "Disillusioned". During this period, the band also recruited guitarist Rex Vijayan. Vijayan later left the group and was subsequently replaced by Deepu Sasidharan, who joined Motherjane as the rhythm guitarist, contributing to the band’s evolving sound during its formative years.

=== 2002–2008: Insane Biography and Maktub ===
Motherjane released their debut studio album Insane Biography in 2002, which quickly became influential in the Indian rock scene and was recognized as one of the country’s most compelling rock albums. They transitioned from a covers band to original songwriters during this era and built a significant fanbase across college festivals and live circuits.

Their second studio album, Maktub (2008), received critical acclaim for its blend of progressive rock and Indian musical elements. Renowned publications like Rolling Stone India highlighted Maktub as a standout album of the year.

=== 2024–present: Reunion ===
After a 12-year hiatus, Motherjane reunited following a decision to embark on a 15th anniversary tour of Maktub. Between 2024 and 2026 they played at several festivals, including Hornbill Festival, Mahindra Independence Rock, and Bengaluru Hubba.

== Line-up ==
=== Current members ===
- Suraj Mani - lead vocals
- Baiju Dharmajan - lead guitar
- Deepu Sasidharan - rhythm Guitar
- Alan Santosh - bass
- Alloy Francis - drums

=== Former members ===
- Rex Vijayan – guitar (2000–2003)
- Laji George – vocals (1996–2000)
- John Thomas – drums (1996–2023)
- Clyde Rozario – bass (1996–2023)
- Mithun Raju – guitar (1996–2004)
- Biju Peter – vocals (1996–1998)
- Deepak Dev – keyboard (1996–1998)
- Santhosh Chandran – guitar (2011–2013)
- Nithin Vijayanath - guitar (2013–2017)
- Vivek Thomas - vocals (2011–2017)

== Discography ==
=== Studio albums ===
- Insane Biography (2002)
- Maktub (2008)

== Footnotes ==
=== References ===
- https://www.telegraphindia.com/my-kolkata/people/indian-rock-band-motherjane-hits-the-stage-after-12-years-with-a-long-lasting-promise/cid/2016486
- https://www.indulgexpress.com/culture/music/2023/Oct/26/motherjane-is-back-in-hyderabad-and-it-feels-like-team-spirit-54538.html
- https://www.thenewsminute.com/article/how-motherjane-carved-out-niche-itself-kerala-s-rock-scene-164710
