= Khlong Ton Sai =

Khlong Ton Sai คลองต้นไทร
- Khwaeng
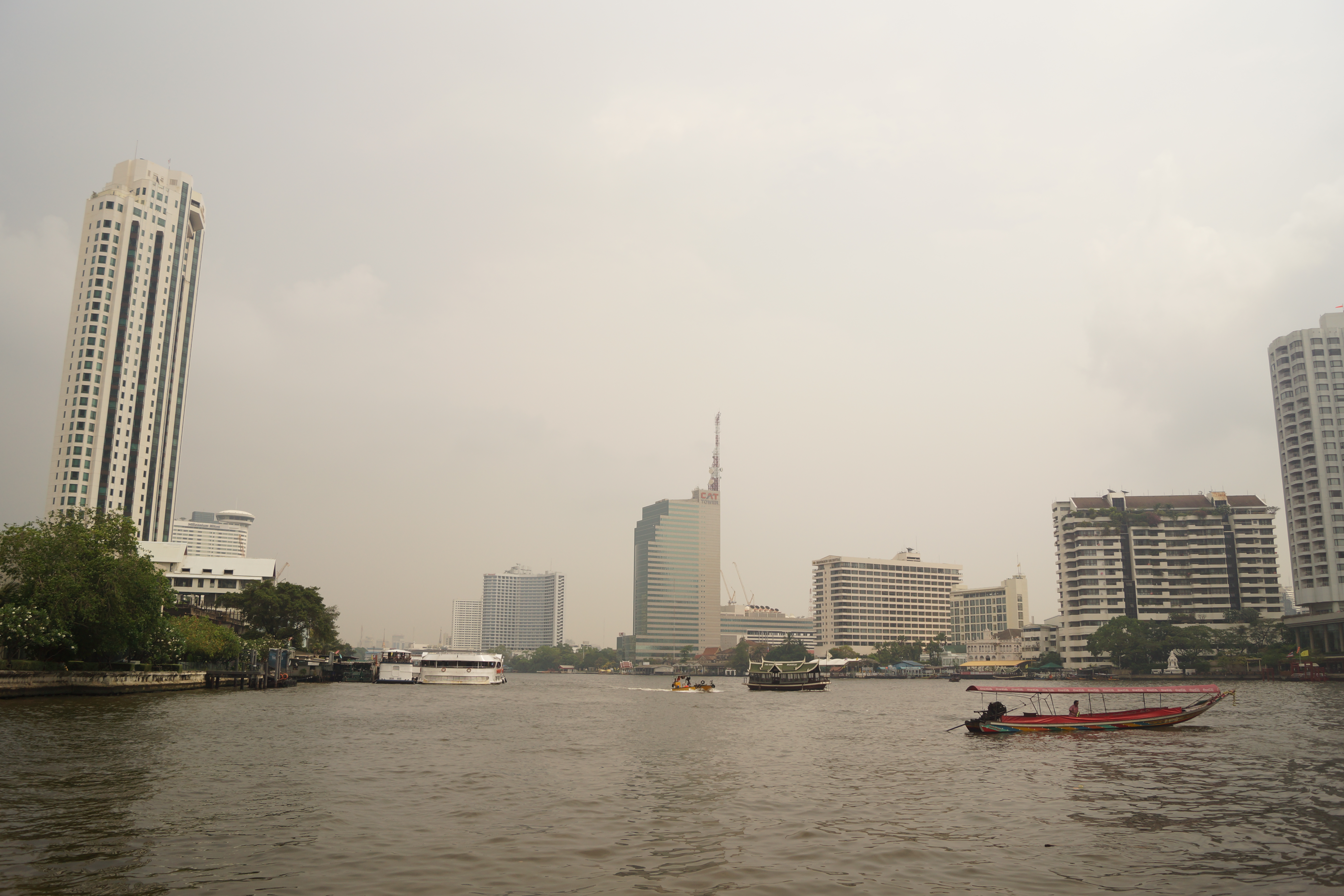
- Khlong Ton Sai (left) as seen from the midstream of the Chao Phraya

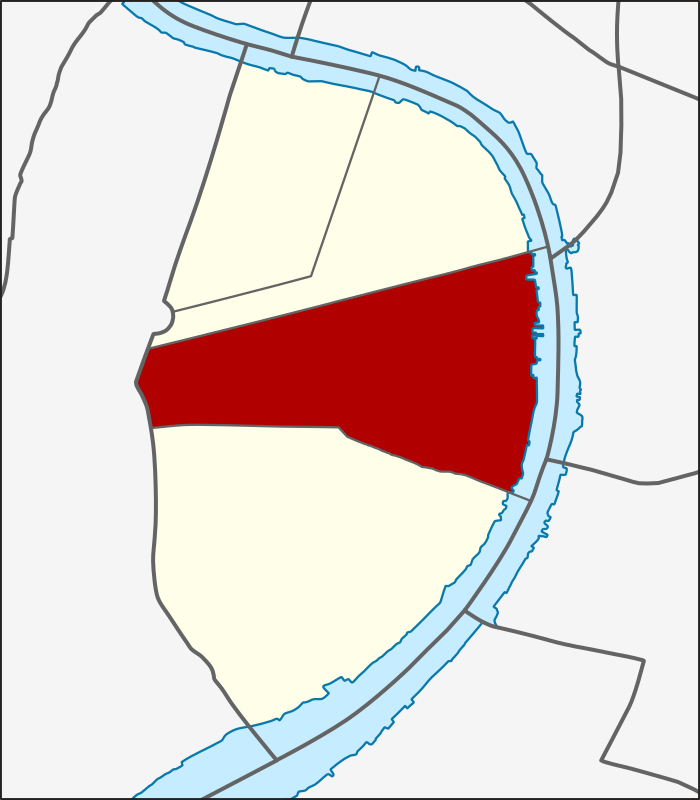
- Location in Khlong San District
- Country: Thailand
- Province: Bangkok
- Khet: Khlong San

Area
  - Total: 1.773 km^{2} (0.685 sq mi)

Population (2020)
  - Total: 18,704
- Time zone: UTC+7 (ICT)
- Postal code: 10600
- TIS 1099: 101804

Khlong Ton Sai (Thai: คลองต้นไทร, pronounced [kʰlɔ̄ːŋ tôn sāj]) is a khwaeng (subdistrict) of Khlong San District, in Bangkok, Thailand. In 2020, it had a total population of 18,704 people.

== History & toponymy ==
The name of the subdistrict, called after the natural khlong (canal) that run through the lower part of area, "Khlong Ton Sai". Its name means "Canal of Figs" because there were many trees of this type growing along the waterways in the past.

In the era before 1957, Khlong Ton Sai was a clear and clean watercourse and was a thoroughfare for people to travel around. It was a path connects the Chao Phraya River with Khlong Bang Sai Kai in the neighbouring Thon Buri area. Currently, the canal is shallow, has polluted water, and is shorter in distance than in the past.
