= Suraj Singh (footballer) =

Indian footballer

Personal information
- Full name: Suraj Singh
- Date of birth: 6 December 1995 (age 30)
- Place of birth: India
- Position: Defender

Team information
- Current team: Churchill Brothers
- Number: 13

Youth career
- Tata Football Academy
- 2014–2017: Churchill Brothers

Senior career*
Years	Team	Apps	(Gls)
2017–	Churchill Brothers	6	(0)
- * Club domestic league appearances and goals as of 03:42, 2 January 2018 (UTC)

Suraj Singh (born 6 December 1995) is an Indian professional footballer who plays as a defender for Churchill Brothers in the I-League.

== Career ==
Singh began his career with the Tata Football Academy. He soon joined Churchill Brothers after graduating from the academy. He made his senior competitive debut for the club in the I-League on 14 February 2017 against Chennai City. He started and played the full match as Churchill Brothers drew 1–1.

== Career statistics ==
As of 28 February 2017

Club	Season	League			League Cup		Domestic Cup		Continental		Total	
Club	Season	Division	Apps	Goals	Apps	Goals	Apps	Goals	Apps	Goals	Apps	Goals
Churchill Brothers	2016–17	I-League	1	0	0	0	0	0	—	—	1	0
Career total			1	0	0	0	0	0	0	0	1	0
