= Suraj Mani =

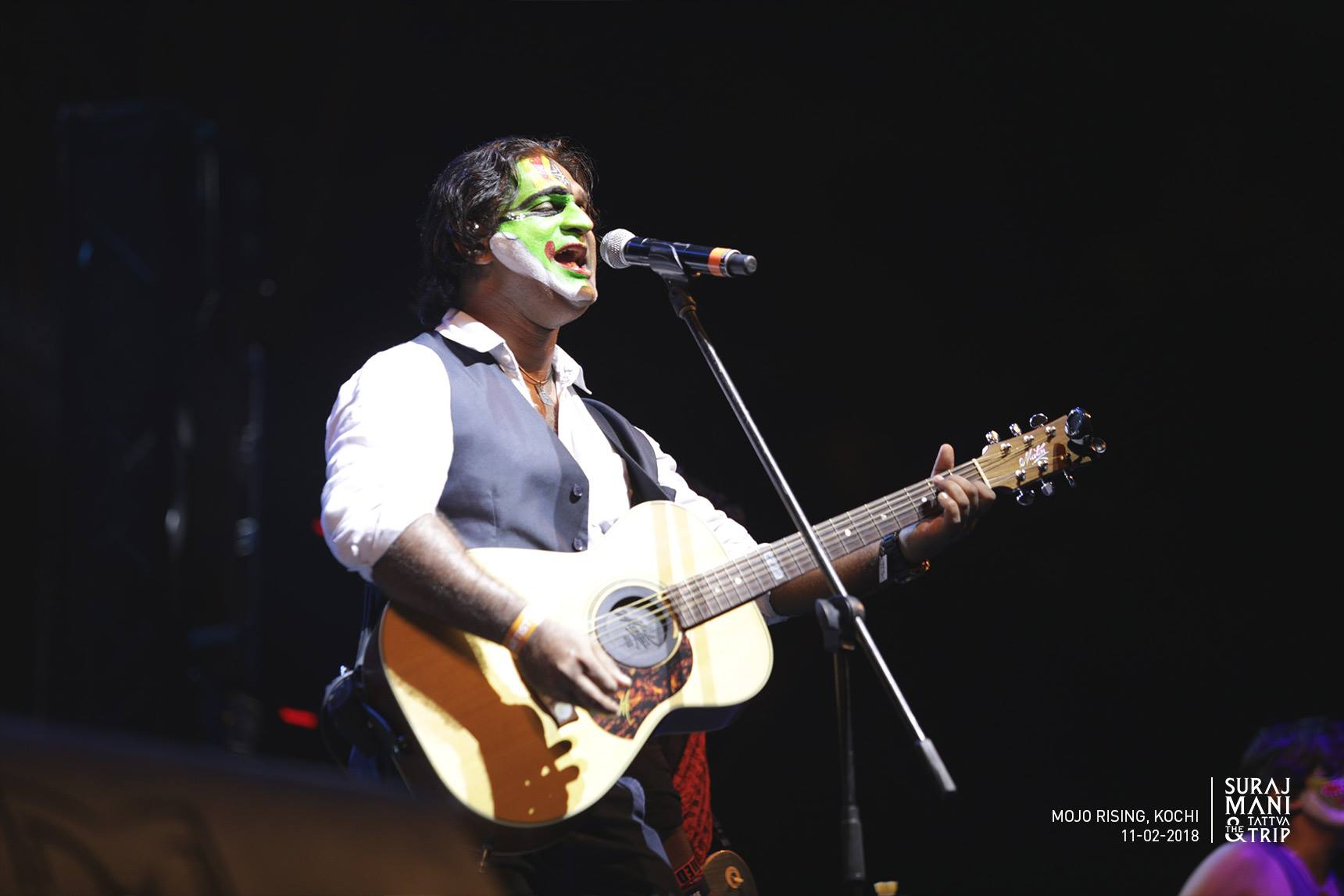
- Mani performing at Mojo Rising, Kochi, 2018

Background information
- Also known as: Singing Sensei
- Born: Suraj Mani; 30 August 1972 (age 54); Nigeria
- Origin: Thangal Kunju Musaliar College of Engineering
- Genre: Rock
- Occupations: Mechanical engineer, musician, poet, songwriter, entrepreneur
- Instruments: Guitar
- Years active: 2002–present
- Label: Aum i Artistes
- Website: https://www.surajmani.in/

Suraj Mani is an Indian rock musician, poet, songwriter, and the lead vocalist of the band Motherjane. Associated with India's indie rock music, Mani has performed with various bands including Thaikkudam Bridge, Indian Ocean, Shubha Mudgal, Indus Creed, Megadeth, Opeth, Third Eye Blind, and Mr. Big.

He is the founder and vocalist of the band Suraj Mani and The Tattva Trip (SMATTT). He holds a degree in Mechanical Engineering from Thangal Kunju Musaliar College of Engineering, Kollam. Alongside his music career, he is the founder and CEO of the HVAC firm Suraj Mani Engineers Pvt. Ltd., and has established Aum I Artistes and the Aum I Art Foundation.

== Albums and releases ==
- Insane Biography: Motherjane, 2002. Produced by Aum I Artistes. Songs from the album include "Mindstreet," "Soul Corporation," "Questions," and "Disillusioned".
- Maktub: Motherjane, 2008. Produced by Aum I Artistes. Songs from the album include "Chasing the Sun," "Fields of Sound," "Broken," "Maktub," and "Karmic Steps".
- The Tattva Trip: Suraj Mani, 2012. Produced by Aum I Artistes, this album was Suraj Mani's first solo work. The release included a book featuring artwork and story line of his journey as an artist. Songs from the album include "Tribes of Babel," "Whole," "The Gift," "Rise Up," and "The Tattva Trip".
- In April 2020, Mani released the single "I am Fine".
- In June 2020, Mani released a four-song EP, titled "Rinse and Repeat".

== Awards and recognition ==
- Best Rock Vocalist in Asia – AVIMA 2010 The World's Largest Indie Awards
- Best Singer – The Jack Daniels Rock Awards 2008–2009
- Best Singer/Songwriter – The Leon Ireland Award 2008–2009
- Best Album Art (The Tattva Trip) – The Jack Daniel Rock Awards 2014
- Best Rock Album (Maktub) – Rolling Stone Magazine 2008, Unwind Awards 2008
