= Suria (Celtic deity) =

Suria, also Syria, is the female deification of supposedly good flowing water, conceived as a weaning Mother goddess, in ancient Celtic polytheism. She was worshipped in Roman Britain and altar-stones raised to her have been recovered at various sites in the United Kingdom. Her name may be derived from the Proto-Celtic *Su-rejā meaning "good-flowing water".
