= Putra Post =

Newspaper in Malaysia

Putra Post was a fortnightly tabloid launched by supporters of the former Prime Minister of Malaysia Mahathir Mohamad, including the Generation Mahathir club. The supposed purpose of this was to spread his views in the rural areas and kampungs. This came in spate of conflicts between Mahathir and the then administration of Abdullah Badawi. The newspaper was funded by businessmen friends of Tun Dr Mahathir.

The first run, which hit newsstands in major towns and cities ahead of the Kubang Pasu UMNO division meeting on 9 September 2006, printed 50,000 copies with 24 pages each. The reaction to the first issue justified publishing an additional 20,000 copies. The issue contained predominantly political content, but also included entertainment sections alongside other features. The first page had displayed Mahathir's picture with an article entitled, "Let Mahathir Speak". Also included were spoofs of various movie posters, satirising that period's political situation.
