= Suriya al-Ghad =

Suriya al-Ghad (Arabic: سوريا الغد, lit. 'the Syria of Tomorrow') was a television news channel associated with the Syrian opposition. The channel broadcast both online and on the Nilesat satellite network.

According to the website of the Dr. Mohamed Al Shabk Global Investment Group, the channel was launched in Paris in 2011. An article on the Al Aan news site, however, identifies activists in Cairo as the channel's founders. The station shut down in 2022.
