= Are Katika =

Regions with significant populations
- Karnataka; Andhra Pradesh; Telangana; Tamil Nadu; Maharashtra

Languages
- Hyderabadi; Telugu; Kannada; Tamil; Marathi

Religion
- Hinduism

The Are Katika (also known as Are-Katika, Katika, or by some groups as Are Suryavanshi) are a community primarily found in the South Indian states of Telangana, Andhra Pradesh, Karnataka, and Tamil Nadu, with presence also reported in parts of Maharashtra.

Community traditions associate them historically with occupations such as trading, livestock-related work, and military service. Over time, many families have moved into: IT & software Government jobs Business Education & engineering Medical And other fields

The community predominantly follows Hinduism.

Some sections of the community identify as Kshatriya and maintain oral traditions linking their ancestry to Maratha military service.

== Etymology ==
The term Are is believed by some sources and community traditions to be linked to the Maratha cultural or linguistic sphere. The term Katika is thought to originate from a Sanskrit-derived occupational term.

Due to perceived negative occupational associations, some members of the community prefer the term Are Suryavanshi, emphasizing a claimed connection to the Suryavansha (Solar Dynasty) described in traditional Hindu genealogies.

== History ==
=== Early traditions ===
Oral traditions within the community suggest historical involvement in military and service roles under regional kingdoms. Some narratives connect the community with Maratha-era military structures in parts of South and Central India.

=== Later historical developments ===
Following political and economic changes in the early modern and colonial periods, many families reportedly transitioned into agriculture, animal husbandry, and trade occupations.

During the British colonial period, caste identities became more formally recorded through census operations, which influenced later administrative classifications.

== Geographic distribution ==
The Are Katika community is mainly found in southern and central India, especially in:

- Telangana
- Andhra Pradesh
- Karnataka
- Tamil Nadu
- Maharashtra

The community is present in both rural and urban areas due to migration and occupational changes.

Changes in classification require legislative and constitutional procedures under Indian law.

== Religion ==
The Are Katika community primarily follows Hinduism. Religious practices generally reflect regional traditions and include worship of local and pan-Hindu deities.

Some sections that identify as Suryavanshi emphasize symbolic reverence toward solar lineage traditions found in Hindu mythology.

== Culture ==
=== Marriage and social customs ===
Marriage practices generally follow regional Hindu customs. Endogamy within the community has traditionally been practiced, although patterns may be changing in urban areas.

=== Festivals ===
Community members typically celebrate major Hindu festivals such as:

- Diwali
- Sankranti / Pongal
- Ugadi
- Dussehra

Local and regional temple festivals are also culturally significant.

== Language ==
Members of the Are Katika community typically speak the dominant regional language of their state, including:

- Telugu
- Kannada
- Tamil
- Marathi
- Hyderabadi Urdu (in some regions)

Multilingualism is common in border regions and urban centres.

== Traditional occupations ==
Historically associated occupations include:

- Military service (historically)

In modern times, members of the community work in diverse professions including agriculture, business, government service, skilled labour, and private sector employment.

== Contemporary issues ==
Like many traditional caste communities in India, the Are Katika community faces issues related to education access, economic development, social mobility, and classification within government reservation systems.

Community organisations have periodically represented these concerns to state and national authorities.

== Identity and naming ==
There is ongoing discussion within the community regarding preferred naming. While Are Katika remains widely used in administrative and historical contexts, some groups promote Are Suryavanshi to emphasise cultural and historical identity.

== See also ==
- Caste system in India
- Other Backward Classes
- Scheduled Castes
- Maratha
