= Sabine (given name) =

- Gender: Female, occasionally male

Other names
- Variant form: Sabina

Sabine is a feminine and occasionally masculine given name of ancient Roman origin that is popular in continental Europe.

Notable people with the name include:

- Sabine Appelmans (born 1972), Belgian former tennis player
- Sabine Auken (born 1965), German bridge player
- Sabine Azéma (born 1949), French actress and director
- Sabine Baeß (born 1961), German pair skater
- Sabine Baring-Gould (1834–1924), English Victorian hagiographer, antiquarian, novelist and eclectic scholar
- Sabine Bätzing-Lichtenthäler (born 1975), German politician
- Sabine Becker (born 1959), German speed skater
- Sabine Bergmann-Pohl (born 1946), East German head of state
- Sabine Bethmann (1929–2021), German movie actress
- Sabine Bohlmann (born 1969), German actress
- Sabine Bothe (born 1960), German handball goalkeeper
- Sabine Bramhoff (born 1964), German high jumper
- Sabine Braun (born 1965), German track and field athlete
- Sabine Busch (born 1962), German athlete
- Sabine Christiansen (born 1957), German journalist and television presenter
- Sabine Dardenne (born 1983), Belgian kidnap victim
- Sabine de Bethune (born 1958), Belgian politician
- Sabine Devieilhe (born 1985), French opera singer
- Sabine Dünser (1977–2006), Liechtensteiner gothic and symphonic metal singer
- Sabine Egger (born 1977), Austrian alpine skier
- Sabine Eichenberger (born 1968), Swiss sprint canoeist
- Sabine Engel (born 1954), German discus thrower
- Sabine Everts (born 1961), German heptathlete
- Sabine Getty, English jewelry designer
- Sabine Ginther (born 1970), Austrian alpine skier
- Sabine Grofmeier (born 1973), German musician
- Sabine Günther (born 1963), German sprinter
- Sabine Hack (born 1969), German tennis player
- Sabine Hark (born 1962), German feminist and sociologist
- Sabine Haudepin (born 1955), French actress
- Sabine Hazboun (born 1994), Palestinian swimmer
- Sabine Heinrich (born 1976), German radio and television presenter
- Sabine Heitling (born 1987), Brazilian athlete
- Sabine Herbst (born 1974), German swimmer
- Sabine Herold (born 1981), French political activist
- Sabine von Heusinger (born 1964), German professor of medieval history
- Sabine Holtz (born 1959), German historian
- Sabine Hossenfelder, German Theoretical Physicist
- Sabine John (born 1957), German heptathlete
- Sabine Jünger (born 1973), German politician
- Sabine Kalter (1890–1957), Polish opera singer
- Sabine Karsenti, French-Canadian actress
- Sabine Kirchmeier (born 1955), German-Danish linguist
- Sabine Klaschka (born 1980), German tennis player
- Sabine Kraml (born 1971), Austrian physicist
- Sabine Krantz (born 1981), German race walker
- Sabine Kratze (c. 1970–1995), German protester by self-immolation
- Sabine Kuegler (born 1972), German author
- Sabine Laruelle (born 1965), Belgian politician
- Sabine Lepsius (1864–1942), German painter
- Sabine Leutheusser-Schnarrenberger (born 1951), German politician
- Sabine Lisicki (born 1989), German tennis player
- Sabine Meyer (born 1959), German classical clarinetist
- Sabine Moritz (born 1969), German painter and graphic designer
- Sabine Moussier (born 1966), German-Mexican actress
- Sabīne Niedola (born 1991), Latvian basketball player
- Sabine Paturel (born 1965), French singer and actress
- Sabine Perraud (born 1982), French actress
- Sabine Pigalle (born 1963), French photographer and artist
- Sabine Piller (born 1970), Australian professor of medical research
- Sabine Pochert, German canoeist
- Sabine Poleyn (born 1973), Flemish politician
- Sabine Quindou, French television journalist
- Sabine Rantzsch (born 1953), German Olympic swimmer
- Sabine Ritter (born 1968), German politician and sociologist
- Sabine Röther (born 1957), German handball player
- Sabine Schmitz (1969–2021), German race car driver
- Sabine Singh (born 1974), American actress
- Sabine Sinjen (1942–1995), German film actress
- Sabine Skvara (born 1966), Austrian high jumper
- Sabine Spitz (born 1971), German cross country cyclist
- Sabine Tröger (born 1967), Austrian former sprinter
- Sabine Uecker (born 1943), German politician
- Sabine Uitslag (born 1973), Dutch politician
- Sabine Ulibarrí (1919–2003), (male) American poet
- Sabine Verheyen (born 1964), German politician
- Sabine Völker (born 1973), German speed skater
- Sabine von Maydell (born 1955), German television actress
- Sabine Wagner, German Paralympian
- Sabine Werner (born 1960), German biochemist
- Sabine Winn (1734–1798), Swiss textile artist
- Sabine Zlatin (1907–1996), French resistance member

== Fictional characters ==
- Sabine Strohem, one of the main characters in The Griffin and Sabine Saga by Nick Bantock
- Sabine Wren, a human female Mandalorian warrior in the Star Wars series
- Sabine, the female love interest of Elodie in Trinkets (TV series)

== See also ==
- Sabina (disambiguation)#People
- Sabine (surname)
