= Sabine (surname) =

Sabine is a surname. Notable people with the surname include:

- Anna Sabine, British Liberal Democrat politician
- Charles Sabine (born 1960), English TV journalist and advocate for patients with degenerative brain disease
- Clement Sabine (1831–1903), pastoralist in South Australia
- David Sabine (born 1966), English cricketer
- Sir Edward Sabine (1788–1883), Irish astronomer, scientist, ornithologist and explorer
- Elizabeth Juliana Leeves Sabine (1807–1879), British translator of Alexander von Humboldt's Kosmos and assistant of her husband Sir Edward Sabine in his scientific work
- Elizabeth Sabine (born 1923), Australian voice coach
- George Holland Sabine (1880–1961), American professor and author of philosophy
- Joseph Sabine (1770–1837), English lawyer and naturalist
- Joseph Sabine (British Army officer) (c. 1661–1739), British general and Member of Parliament
- Lorenzo Sabine (1803–1877), U.S. Representative from Massachusetts
- Paul Earls Sabine (1879–1958), American acoustic engineer
- Roy Sabine, English rugby union and rugby league footballer of the 1950s and 1960s, and rugby league coach of the 1970s
- Thierry Sabine, (1949–1986), French motorcycle racer and organiser of the Paris-Dakar rally raid
- Wallace Clement Sabine (1868–1919), physicist, founded the field of architectural acoustics
- William Sabine (1491–1543), English politician
