= Fluorescent glucose biosensor =

Blood glucose measurement device

Fluorescent glucose biosensors are devices that measure the concentration of glucose in diabetic patients by means of sensitive protein that relays the concentration by means of fluorescence, an alternative to amperometric sension of glucose. Due to the prevalence of diabetes, it is the prime drive in the construction of fluorescent biosensors. A recent development has been approved by the FDA allowing a new continuous glucose monitoring system called EverSense, which is a 90-day glucose monitor using fluorescent biosensors.

== Application ==
Keeping glucose levels in check is crucial to minimize the onset of the damage caused by diabetes. As a consequence, in conjunction with insulin administrations, the prime requirement for diabetic patients is to regularly monitor their blood glucose levels. The monitoring systems currently in general use have the drawback of below optimal number of readings, due to their reliance on a drop of fresh blood. Some continuous glucose monitors are commercially available, but suffer from the severe drawback of a short working life of the probe. The majority of these work amperometrically. As a result, there is an effort to create a sensor that relies on a different mechanism, such as via external infrared spectroscopy or via fluorescent biosensors.

Various strategies exist to detect glucose levels using fluorescence, the first and most common being a Fret competition assay between glucose and a labelled glucose polymer for the binding site of Concanavalin A. Over the years, using a combination of rational design and screening approaches, many possible combinations of fluorescent sensor for glucose have been studied with varying degrees of success: In most approaches, the glucose concentration is translated into a change in fluorescence either by using a Fret pair or by using environment sensitive (solvatochromic) dyes in a variety of combinations, the fluorescent small molecule, protein or quantum dot have been used in conjunction with a glucose binding moiety either a boronic acid functionalized fluorophore or a protein, such as glucose oxidase, concanavalin A, glucose/galactose-binding protein, glucose dehydrogenase and glucokinase. In general, the change seen with Fret competition assays is small (see below).

== Theory of fluorescence ==
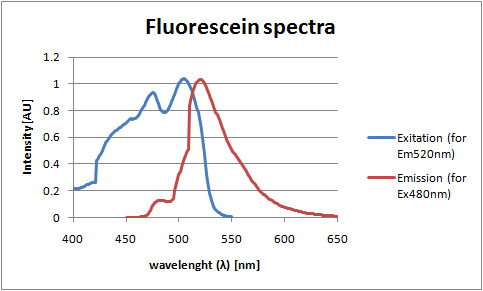
Absorption and emission spectra of fluorescein

Fluorescence is a property present in certain molecules, called fluorophores, in which they emit a photon shortly after absorbing one with a higher energy wavelength.

To be more specific, in order for an electron in the outer orbital of a molecule to jump from a ground-state orbital to an excited state orbital, it requires a fixed amount of energy, which, in the case of chromophores (molecules that absorb light), can be acquired by absorbing a photon with an energy equal or slightly higher. This state is short-lived, and the electron returns to the ground-level orbital, losing the energy either as heat or in the case of fluorophores by emitting a photon, which, due to the loss of the difference between the energy of the absorbed photon and the excitation energy required, will have a lower energy than the absorbed photon, or, expressed in terms of wavelength, the emitted photon will have a longer wavelength. The difference between the two wavelengths is called Stokes' shift.

This property can be found in quantum dots, certain lanthanides and certain organic molecules with delocalized electrons.

These excited molecules have an increase in dipole momentum and in some cases can undergo internal charge rearrangement. When they possess an electron withdrawing group and an electron donating group at opposite ends of the resonance structure, they have a large shift in charge distribution across the molecule, which causes the solvent molecules to reorient to a less energetic arrangement, called solvent relaxation. By doing so, the energy of the excited state decreases, and the extent of the difference in energy depends on the polarity of the solvent surrounding the molecule.

An alternative approach is to use solvatochromic dyes, which change their properties (intensity, half-life, and excitation, and emission spectra), depending on the polarity and charge of their environments. Hence, they are sometimes loosely referred to as environmentally sensitive dyes. These can be positioned on specific residues that either change their spatial arrangement due to a conformational change induced by glucose or reside in the glucose-binding pocket whereby the displacement of the water present by glucose decreases the polarity.

An additional property of fluorescence that has found a large usage is Förster resonance energy transfer (Fret) in which the energy of the excited electron of one fluorophore, called the donor, is passed on to a nearby acceptor dye, either a dark-quencher (non-emitting chromophore) or another fluorophore, which has an excitation spectrum that overlaps with the emission spectrum of the donor dye, resulting in a reduced fluorescence.

For sensing purposes, this property is, in general, used either in combination with a biomolecule, such as a protein, which undergoes a conformational change upon ligand binding, changing the distance between the two labels on this protein, or in a competition assay, in which the analyte has to compete with a known concentration of a fixed labelled ligand for the labelled binding site of protein. Therefore, the Fret between the binding site and the competing ligand decreases when the analyte concentration is increased. In general, the competing ligand in the case of glucose is dextran, a long glucose polymer attached to the scaffolding or to the enzyme.

== Förster resonance energy transfer ==
Cartoon of FRET between two protein interacting protein, labelled with fluorescein and tetramethylrhodamine

Over the years, using a combination of rational design and screening procedures, many possible typologies of fluorescent sensors for glucose have been created with varying degrees of success. In general, these sensors rely either on Fret or on sensitivity to polarity changes to translate the glucose concentration into fluorescent intensity.

In addition to the fluorophores, these sensors contain a molecule that confers glucose specificity, usually a protein. A variety of proteins have been used for this purpose, often with different labs concentrating on one particular protein.

The first glucose biosensor reported in the literature was made in 1982 by Schultz's group using a Fret competition assay between glucose and a labelled glucose polymer for the binding site of Concanavalin A entrapped in a hollow dialysis fibre. As a result, Con A was widely used in subsequent sensors in several labs, however Con A suffers from the downside of high toxicity and low reversibility. As a result, other glucose-binding proteins were and are being explored by several labs.

In Biotex Inc. (Houston), McNichols and Ballastardt created a dialysis fibre-enclosed ConA Fret sensor, which has undergone testing in animal models for several years.

Amperometric biosensors, in contrast, can utilise only glucose oxidase as a protein, as it is a redox enzyme. This protein has also been used in fluorescent sensing either simply as an apoenzyme or as a holoenzyme. An exception to this group of sensors is the Biocapacitor A Sode's group, which relies on glucose dehydrogenase instead.

The activity of glucose oxidase has also been used to make lifetime-based fluorescent/phosphorescent sensors, taking advantage of the fact that the protein oxidises glucose, utilizing molecular oxygen, and that oxygen quenches the fluorescence of ruthenium. This was done by Uwira and colleagues in 1984 and followed by several groups.

To be specific, Endo and Pasic have used this GOx-based oxygen-quenching assay to make a fibre-based sensor, whilst McShane uses GOx-based oxygen-quenching assay in microspheres made with the aim of subcutaneous injection in order to create what the group has coined a "smart tattoo", a sensor operating non-invasively by reporting across the skin, taking advantage of the fact the skin is permeable to near-infrared light. In addition, this group has created several Fret completion assays, first using ConA (TRITC-Con A /FITC-dextran (500kDa)), but then switching to GOx apoenzyme in 2004 (TRITC-apo-GOx /FITC-dextran (500kDa)), and in 2009 testing sensors (QSY-21-apo-GOx /Alexa647- dextran) in microspheres. Several other groups have constructed smart tattoos and are reviewed below.

One particular GOx oxygen ruthenium-quenching assay was used in a study in Ingo Klimant's group, in a fully functional sensor to measure glucose levels in a healthy volunteer. The sensor was constructed by functionalizing an oxygen sensor with glucose oxidase and inserting it into the external part of a catheter used for monitoring.

Apoenzymes can still bind glucose but, due to the lack of cofactors (in vitro), cannot catalyse their reaction so are less likely to get damaged.

Other proteins that have been used are glucokinase from a thermophile in D'auria group and glucose-galactose-binding protein (Ggbp), which is not an enzyme but a periplasmic protein involved in chemotaxis that undergoes a large conformational change.

The majority of the fluorophores used for the sensors are small molecules, although some sensors have been made using quantum dots (QD) or fluorescent protein.

Sensors have been made using QD as Fret donors and a small molecule or gold nanoparticle (dark quencher) as acceptors. An example of the former is Loeb's sensil, an optic fibre system in which the quantum dot is attached to ConA whilst tetramethylrhodamine is attached to cyclodextran, which in turn is attached to the PEG diacrylate scaffold. An example of the latter is Tang with QDs-ConA-beta-CDs-AuNPs.

Fluorescent protein can be made into a fusion protein with a desired protein, circumventing the labelling steps. Shultz made a Ggbp molecule with two GFP at each end. It has not been reported in the literature, but in theory it is possible to improve this by doing a directed in vitro evolution using FACS. This is not easily done by labelling, although a screening has been attempted by Pitner.

Fluorescence is not the only type of luminescence achievable in biological systems: Chemiluminescence, the generation of light by means of chemical reactions, is produced by some proteins, such as Aqueorin from symbiont in jellyfish and luciferase from symbiont in fireflies. These have been used to make glucose sensors: Daunert makes a Ggbp-split aqueorin sensor and in 2009 Koji Sode made Ggbp-luciferase with Asp459Asn (Glc not Gal).

In addition to small-molecule dyes, fluorescent proteins have been used: One group made a near-infrared (NIR) Fret sensor detected by means of time-resolved/nanotomography allophycocyanin-ConA/malachite green-Dextran, regarding Fret with Allophycocyanin, which MacColl has reviewed.

In addition to protein as the glucose-binding moiety, boronic acid functionalized molecules have been used. Boronic acid binds to vicinal groups, preferably hydroxyl; therefore, it has a high affinity for carbohydrates. The use of the boronic acid group for the recognition of saccharide has been widely studied by Shinkai, James and their collaborators. To take advantage of this several approaches have been taken.

One approach is by Fret quenching, in which the system can work through the modulation of the quenching of a dye by a boronic acid functionalized viologen.

An alternative approach is by photo-induced electron transfer (PET), a mechanism of fluorescence-quenching due to the electron-rich tertiary amino group near the fluorophore, which is affected by the change in charge of the nearby boronate group when glucose is bound. This has been used in combination with lifetime by one group., not only in fluorescence but as NMR agent for imaging with a Europium (3+) boronic acid dye.

== Environment sensing dyes ==
Example of an environmentally sensitive dye, Badan, which having a tertiary amine and a ketone at opposite ends displays a large change in dipole momentum when excited (including an internal charge transfer), which results in turn in a significant lowering of the energy when solvent relaxation occurs

The majority of the sensors adopting environmentally sensitive dyes have utilized Ggbp, a transport protein that binds to D-glucose and D-galactose and transports them to the membrane-bound Trg receptor triggering the chemotaxis of the bacterium towards that glucose source. It belongs to the malG family in Escherichia coli, which includes the maltose-binding protein, which, depending on the presence of glucose, can adopt two distinct conformations or possibly three generating a 31° hinge movement between the two globular domains connected by a hinge, which is the glucose-binding pocket. Its affinity for glucose is K= 0.2 μM, which is much lower than the pathophysiological range of glucose found in diabetes (1.7-33 mM). As a consequence, several studies have been done to lower the affinity of Ggbp, which otherwise would result in near-saturation of Ggbp throughout the pathophysiological glucose concentrations. The binding affinity of Ggbp changes when it is labelled endosterically or peristerically, so several mutants that work at range close to pathophysiological glucose have been created.

Ggbp contains five tryptophan residues, two of which, W183 in the binding site and W284 in the N-terminal domain (which can bind calcium), affect the autofluorescence spectra upon glucose binding.

Some studies with Ggbp and solvatochromic dyes work not to create a sensor, but to elucidate the chemistry behind the conformational change of Ggbp. Examples of this include a study utilizing L255C with acrylodan and ruthenium at the N-terminus revealing three conformational states closed and twisted, the fluorescence and phosphorescence of the tryptophan W183 under normal conditions [52], under high pressure and with or without calcium.

Sode et al. made a series of mutants of Ggbp to increase the Kd in the unlabelled form near physiological range (Phe16Ala) and remove galactose specificity (Asp14Glu).

The response of an environment sensitive dye attached to a specific residue of Ggbp depends not only on the labelling site, which has a certain environment, but also on the nature of the dye, which interacts differently depending on its geometry. The interaction between a given dye and its environment is hard to predict in silico. As a result, in order to obtain a working sensor, several independent studies have screened a set of environmentally sensitive dyes attached to several possible sites in the binding pocket (endosteric site), near it (peristeric site) or away from it (allosteric site).

One advantage of Ggbp is that in the wild-type there are no cysteine residues, making the introduction of this residue in a specific location ideal for labelling.

A team led by Homme Hellinga (Note: Despite the controversy surrounding Homme Hellinga (see Hellinga Controversy Expands) these results are not under investigation.) conducted two large screens. In the first (2002) they made of a series (320 constructs) of labelled mutants of 11 bacterial periplasmic binding protein including Ggbp for which they made nine mutants introducing a cysteine in a specific spot (Y10C, N15C, E93C, E149C, H152C, W183C, L255C, D257C, V296C) and tested the response when labelled with one out of eight dyes (pyrene (340, 390); acrylodan (390, 500); fluorescein (485, 520); NBD (490, 540); NBDE (490, 530); JPW4039 (485, 590); JPW4042 (470, 640); and JPW4045 (470, 640)). Out of the 72 combinations made, Ggbp labelled with acrylodan in position W183C had a fivefold change and kd=5mM.

In a subsequent study (2007), using the heat-stable Ggbp from Thermotoga maritima they screened five mutants (Y13C, W14C, Y189C, S131C and M239C) with four dyes (Ianbd, Acrylodan, Cy5 and Cy3) identifying Y13C-Cy5 conjugate, which gave a maximal increase of 50% and affinity at 15mM.

A group led by Daunert used three endosteric mutants (G148C, H152C and M182C) in combination with four dyes (acrylodan, 1,5-IAEDANS, MDCC and Ianbd ester) identifying M182C–MDCC, which gave a 30% change in fluorescence. A very different approach was taken by Pitner in BD, who used a single dye (Ianbd) attached to E149C as a starting point for a directed evolution screen, in which a mutant library is created and selected for "winners", namely mutants that meet the selection criteria. With this approach they identified E149C/A213R/L238S with kd of 10mM and an eightfold increase in fluorescence; this mutant was later used for SPR.

Independently (Note: Despite the same mutant being present, the paper does not cite but obtained the mutant by investigating the secondary structure.) another group (J Pickup) tested two mutants (H152C and M182C) labelled with Badan (6-bromoacetyl-2-dimethylaminonaphtalene), bound to the thiol group of the cisteine introduced at site 152 (H152C mutant). This showed a threefold increase (200% change) upon saturating glucose binding, making it an ideal candidate for a sensor. Later work, adopting the mutations identified by Pitner (above), generated a Badan-labelled Ggbp mutant (H152C/A213R/L238S), with a dissociation constant in the human physiological glucose range (Km=11mM) and a twofold increase in fluorescence (100% change).

== Tissue autofluorescence ==
Another pair of papers suggest that the natural fluorescence (autofluorescence) of tissues may be harnessed to track glucose concentrations. These studies took advantage of the fact that NAD(P)H, in its reduced form, is autofluorescent, and that metabolites such as glucose cause a predictable increase in NAD(P)H reduction.

== Sensing in vivo ==
An alternative way of measuring the change in environment of environmental dyes is their change in lifetime, which may give better results in some sensors, using lanthanides or e.g. the aforementioned ruthenium (Ru) metal-ligand complex, either with GOx or as an Fret acceptor of an environment sensitive dye as in the case of ANS26-Ggbp in a ruthenium-coated cuvette that shows little increase in intensity but a substantial change in lifetime.

The construction of the fluorescent protein is only one subsystem of a clinically viable monitoring device: the sensing protein has to be immobilized and its fluorescence has to be read by a detecting subsystem that, in turn, informs the user.

In the ideal situation, the detector could be implanted with the immobilized protein and queried by radio frequency, however this has currently been achieved only with amperormetric sensors. The general approach for fluorescent sensors is to attach the protein to one extremity of an optic fibre implanted under the skin whilst the other extremity is connected to the detection subsystem, which includes a path splitter (sliced fibre or dichroic mirror) to allow the fibre to transmit both the excitation and the emitted light, a filtered light source (in general, a laser), and a filtered photodetector (a CCD or a PMT). The information thus collected is then analysed with a computer.

== Smart tattoo ==
The skin is permeable to near-infrared light (NIR). As a consequence, near-infrared dyes can be measured across the skin without the need of an optic fibre; this has been termed a "smart tattoo" by McShane who created a near-infrared oxygen quenching assay contained in microspheres.

However, there is a limited amount of commercially available fluorescent dyes, and a limited amount of environmentally sensitive dyes, such as cyanine cy7. As a consequence, Pitner made a reactive Nile red dye, but to date no study with a Nile red-Ggbp sensor has been conducted.

Nevertheless, several studies with NIR dyes have been done. Pickup and Birch made a NIR Fret sensor measuring both the time-resolved counts or by nanotomography of allophycocyanin-ConA/malachite green-Dextran, where allophycocyanin is a NIR fluorescent protein. In another study, the autofluorescence of NAPH, an energy carrier in cells, was assessed as an indirect indicator.

A group at BioTex Inc, led by McNichols and Ballerstadt, created a NIR Fret sensor based on ConA, with NIR dyes Alexa 647 and Alexa 750 (originally Alexa 647 & cy7) enclosed in a dialysis fibre attached to the end of an optic fibre, which they have dubbed "FAS" (fluorescent). To improve the stability they attached the protein to a sephadex, a macroporous hydrogel. Despite the change in Fret of only 35% across the pathophysiological range (possibly 40% maximum change form no glucose to saturation), the sensor has been shown to decrease in functionality by only 20% after 450 days incubation at 37 °C (99 °F) and to monitor glucose as well as the Medtronic/Minimed CGMS sensor in animal models (mouse, pig, and dog); however their stated aim is to create a smart tattoo.

Draper Laboratory are also developing a smart tattoo, and are currently testing on animals. The performance and the identity of the sensor have not been revealed.

== Encapsulation in dialysis membranes ==
Despite the higher benefit of smart tattoos compared to a transdermal optic fibre, no in vivo smart tattoo has yet been demonstrated, whereas fibre-based systems have been shown to be potential sensors.

The majority of the sensors mentioned in the previous sections consisted of labelled proteins in solution. The only sensors to progress towards an implantable sensor have been either GOx–ruthenium oxygen-quenching assay sensors or Fret competition assay sensors; to date, no environment sensitive dye-based sensors attached at the end of a fibre has been published.

For fibre-based biosensors to work, the protein must be immobilized to the fibre that can either entrapped in a hollow tube made of dialysis membrane or entrapped in a hydrogel.

A hollow dialysis tube is a tube with sub-millimetre diameter whose walls are composed of porous crosslinked cellulose designed to allow small solutes through but not large biomolecules, such as protein with a cut-off ranging from 0.5 to 20 kDa. As a consequence, they are well suited for sensory applications, where the analyte is free to diffuse across whilst proteins cannot, both the sensor protein inside and the blood/interstitial tissue proteases. In fact, the Menarini Diagnostics' GlucoDay sensor has an improved lifetime because the injected probe uses a dialysis membrane, although to drastically increase the diffusion rate it is coupled with a pump.

== Encapsulation in a hydrogel ==
Regarding its application in fluorescent sensing of glucose, the first glucose biosensor by fluorescence, which, as mentioned, was made in 1982 by means of a Fret competition assay for the binding site of ConA, was entrapped in a sealed microdialysis tube, in the same lab, namely of J Schultz, in 2001 another study was published using microdialysis fibres using a Fret ConA sensor but with different labels and using sephadex instead of dextran (the former being several orders of magnitude larger). After, Dr. Ballastardt joined BioTex as a senior scientist under Dr Roger McNichols, the chief scientist, where for the past seven years they have been testing the previously mentioned FAS sensor, which used the same Fret system in a dialysis tube. To be specific, the labelled protein was loaded with a P10 tip into a dialysis tube 200 μm wide that had been sealed with cyanoacrylate (superglue) at one end with or without an optic fibre end inserted inside.

In the field of sensors of analytes, glucose sensors have been at the forefront due to the large amount of research into glucose sensors as a result of the prevalence of diabetes, nevertheless, a wide breadth of optic fibre-based biosensors, mainly using enzymes, immunoassays, nucleic acids, whole cells or biomimetic materials and relying on different detection methods (fluorescence, absorbance, chemiluminescence, and scattering), and attachment methods (coating, hydrogels, or membranes).

The majority of these sensors, however, rely on entrapping the protein in hydrogels, as these are more sturdy and protect the protein more than a simple coating or membrane. A hydrogel is a porous crosslinked polymer matrix filled with water. Several types of hydrogel exist and have been used to entrap small molecules such as dyes, biomolecules, such as enzymes or whole cells. In the case of protein, they can work either by physically entrapping the protein having pores smaller than the proteins or by chemical linkage of the protein to the matrix. In physically entrapping gels, the protein has to be added when the gel is crosslinked, so the conditions used must not damage the protein, excluding the hydrogel, which requires non-aqueous solvents or harsh chemicals, an example being TEMED-persulphate-catalysed (peroxide radical initiation) acrylamide or acrylate, which is used for SDS PAGE but for not protein encapsulation.

Hydrogels have been extensively studied, mainly in the entrapment of small molecules for drug delivery, including cases where the hydrogel nanoparticles slowly release the drug to a targeted site. Hydrogels can be classified according to their polymers constituents, which can be natural (Hyaluronan, alginic acid, pectin, carrageenan, chondroitin sulfate, dextran and dextran sulphate, chitosan, polylysine, collagen, carboxymethyl chitin, fibrin, agarose, pullulan), or synthetic (PEG, PLA, PLGA, PCL, PHB, PVA, PNVP, P(HEMA), p(biscarboxy-phenoxy-phosphazene), p(GEMA-sulfate), and others), or a hybrid of the two. In addition to organic hydrogels there are sol-gels, which are oxygen-bridged silicates (or titanium oxide), that polymerise in water. An additional classification can be by method of polymerization, which can be physical (freezing or heating) or chemical (γ-ray, oxygen or photo-induced radical polymerization in the case of acrylates, vinyls and acrylamides).

All the various hydrogels have different advantages and disadvantage, such as biocompatibility, protein stability, toxicity, or lifetime; for example, the gelling conditions for sol-gels may damage the protein, and, as a result, several copolymers, such as chitosan, may be added (making hybrid gels) or alternative monomers, such as glycol-modified tetraethoxysilane as it is more biocompatible than the commonly used methoxy- or ethoxy-modified tetraethoxysilane.

== Fibers with hydrogel ==
Regarding fibre-optic-based biosensors, several hydrogels have been used but mainly acrylate-based polymers and sol-gels, either by chemical or physical entrapment. In the case of acetylcholinesterase, the target of many pesticides, a sensors has been made chemically linking the enzyme to an acrylate hydrogel or physically entrapping the enzyme in solgel.

An optic-fibre-based hydrogel-entrapped biosensor for glucose was made in the lab of Loeb (Liao and colleagues) and was named Sencil. this sensor was composed of a photocrosslinked diacrylate-modified PEG hydrogel containing the tetra-rhodamine (TRITC), labelled Fret competitor betacyclodextrin and the quantum dot-labelled apoenzyme Concanavalin A. This sensor was tested only in vitro for functionality; however, some tests were done to see the compatibility of the fibre implanted transdermally in mice. In particular, the inflammation was monitored and the energy required to remove it by force was measured proving that the collagen-coated fibre required more force than to remove a hair, which has the same diameter (200μl).

Another fibre-based sensor was done in Singaram lab (santa Cruz). This used a 2-hydroxyethyl methacrylate hydrogel as a scaffold onto which two dyes were attached one a fluorescent anionic dye and a cationic quencher (to be specific, a viologen) functionalized with boronic acid, which assumes a negative charge when bound to glucose, making the net charge of the molecule neutral and less attracted to the fluorophore, hence modulating its intensity based on glucose concentration.

The majority of hydrogels are attached to the fibre, one exception being the fibre optic-based sensor made by Itsubayashi's group to measure glucose in fish (health indicator), which used a dialysis membrane as the support for the hydrogel. To be more specific, it relied on a GOx oxygen-ruthenium quenching assay where the protein was mixed with AWP (azide-functionalized polyvinyl alcohol, a photocrosslinkable polymer) and cross-linked to a dialysis membrane that was rolled around a premade ruthenium oxygen probe (ocean optics) and inserted into an 18-gauge needle with eight holes on the side (akin to a recorder). In such a set-up, the integrity of the protein has no effect on the sensor, unless below a certain concentration. As a consequence, the destruction or inaccessibility of a fraction of the protein is not problematic, which is in contrast to Fret or environmentally sensitive sensing. However, the response speed of this sensor is slow and requires a mathematical prediction to be applied to the measurement.

An alternative use of boronic acid in hydrogels is seen in Stokke in Norway where the swelling of a boronate functionalized acrylamide gel due to charge change upon glucose binding is measured by a Fabry–Pérot interferometer on the other end of the fibre (note that this a different method than fluorescence and relies on scattering).

An exception to the usage of placing the optic fibre transdermally is seen in the previously mentioned fibre from Ingo Klimant's group (ruthenium-quenching by oxygen released by glucose-catalysed GOx): The sensor, in fact, was constructed by functionalizing a premade oxygen sensor with Glucose oxydase and inserting it into a glucose-sensing apparatus for amperometric sensors, in particular, a microdialysis catheter CMA 60 implanted transdermally and the sensor connected to its tygon tubing. This sensor was tested in a human volunteer and showed results par with current amperometric systems. The usage of a fibre was dictated by the pre-availability of this compared to a ruthenium-coated lens, which would have had achieved the same results, so this approach should be put in a category of its own alongside transdermal fibres and smart tattoos. However, the aim of the group is to create glucose-sensitive nanoparticles to be interrogated with a transdermal optic fibre and controlled magnetically. As a consequence, the group is improving the oxygen sensing probe by investigating novel oxygen sensitive phosphorescent materials, nanoparticle formulation and the creation of magnetic nanoparticles.

== See also ==
- Blood glucose monitoring
- Diabetes management
- Glucose meter
