= Gregorio Weber =

Argentine scientist (1916–1997)

- Born: 4 July 1916; Buenos Aires, Argentina
- Died: 18 July 1997 (aged 81); Urbana, Illinois, US
- Education: University of Buenos Aires (MD), University of Cambridge (PhD)
- Awards: “Weber Symposia”
- Scientific career
- Fields: Protein fluorescence
- Institutions: University of Illinois at Urbana-Champaign; Sir William Dunn Institute of Biochemistry, Cambridge; Sheffield University
- Thesis: Fluorescence of Riboflavin, Diaphorase and Related Substances (1947)
- Doctoral advisor: Malcolm Dixon
- Doctoral students: Joseph R. Lakowicz, Suzanne Scarlata

Gregorio Weber (4 July 1916 – 18 July 1997) was an Argentinian scientist who made significant contributions to the fields of fluorescence spectroscopy and protein chemistry. Weber was elected to the National Academy of Sciences in 1975.

== Early life and education ==
Gregorio Weber was born in Buenos Aires, Argentina in 1916. He attended the University of Buenos Aires where he received his Doctor of Medicine degree in 1942. He worked as a medical student from 1939 to 1943 in the Department of Physiology and Biochemistry as a teaching assistant for Bernardo Alberto Houssay. Houssay was renowned as a physiologist for his work on the endocrine system and in particular the pituitary gland, and shared the 1947 Nobel Prize for Physiology and Medicine. Weber continued his studies at the University of Cambridge under the guidance of Malcolm Dixon, well-known enzymologist, and, in 1947, earned a Ph.D. in biochemistry. His thesis, titled "Fluorescence of Riboflavin, Diaphorase and Related Substances", marked the beginning of the application of fluorescence spectroscopy to biomolecules.

Weber’s thesis was devoted especially to measurements of the quenching of fluorescence of riboflavin, and on development of a general theory of quenching by complex formation. This led to his first publication, the first to demonstrate that fluorescence quenching can take place after formation of molecular complexes of finite duration rather than collisions. His second publication was the first demonstration of an internal complex in FAD. Years later he was to follow up this work with the first demonstration that NADH also formed an internal complex and with more complete characterizations of the excited state properties of FAD and NADH.

From 1948 to 1952 Weber carried out independent investigations at the Sir William Dunn Institute of Biochemistry at Cambridge, supported by a British Beit Memorial Fellowship. He began to delve more deeply into the theory of fluorescence polarization and also began to develop methods which would allow study of proteins that did not contain an intrinsic fluorophore such as FAD or NADH. To this end, he invested considerable time and effort in synthesizing a fluorescent probe that could be covalently attached to proteins and which possessed absorption and emission characteristics appropriate for the instrumentation available in post-war England.

The result of two years of effort was the still popular probe dimethylaminonaphthalene sulfonyl chloride or dansyl chloride. With this tool in hand and with new instrumentation he began to investigate several protein systems, publishing his theory and experimental results in two classic papers published in 1952, The theory paper extends Perrin’s theory of depolarization due to rotation of ellipsoidal molecules. Specifically, Weber showed that Perrin’s complex equations, which required a knowledge of the orientation of the fluorophore’s absorption and emission oscillators with respect to the axis of rotation of the ellipsoid, could be considerably simplified if the fluorophores carrying the oscillators were assumed to be randomly oriented on the macromolecule. This paper also contained a formulation of the law of additivity of polarizations.

Weber stayed at Cambridge as an independent researcher until 1953 when Hans Krebs recruited him for the new Biochemistry Department at Sheffield University.

== University of Illinois ==
In the early 1960s, Irwin “Gunny” Gunsalus, then the head of the Biochemistry Division of the Department of Chemistry at the University of Illinois at Urbana-Champaign, recruited Weber. Gunsalus related the story that while he was convincing his colleagues that Gregorio Weber was an exceptional scientist, someone commented that Weber didn’t have as many publications as one might expect from a senior professor. Gunny explained that while this was true, Weber’s ratio of outstanding papers to total papers was unity and that this ratio — known thereafter as the Weber ratio — was certainly the more important consideration. Gregorio Weber joined the University of Illinois in 1962 and built a research program that continued actively until his death from leukaemia on July 17, 1997. During the early years in Urbana, he continued to develop novel fluorescence instrumentation and probes and extended his studies of protein systems.

== Scientific contributions ==
Gregorio Weber was responsible for many of the more important theoretical and experimental developments in modern fluorescence spectroscopy. In particular, he pioneered the application of fluorescence spectroscopy to the biological sciences. His list of achievements includes the following:

the synthesis and use of dansyl chloride as a probe of protein hydrodynamics;

the extension of Perrin’s theory of fluorescence polarization to fluorophores associated with random orientations with ellipsoids of revolution and to mixtures of fluorophores;

the first spectral resolution of the fluorescence of the aromatic amino acids and of intrinsic fluorescence of proteins; the first demonstration that both FAD and NADH make internal complexes;

the first report on aromatic secondary amines, which are strongly fluorescent in apolar solvents, but hardly in water, the most spectacular case being the anilino naphthalene sulfonates (ANS);

the first description of the use of the fluorescence of small molecules as probes for the viscosity of micelles, with implications for membrane systems; a general formulation of depolarization by energy transfer;

the discovery of the “red-edge” effect in homo-energy transfer;

the development of modern cross-correlation phase fluorometry;

the development of the excitation-emission matrix method for resolving contributions from multiple fluorophores;

the synthesis of several novel fluorophores, including pyrenebutyric acid, IAEDANS, bis-ANS, PRODAN and LAURDAN, designed to probe dynamic aspects of biomolecules.

In addition to these seminal contributions, Gregorio Weber also trained and inspired generations of spectroscopists and biophysicists who went on to make important contributions to their fields, including both basic research as well as the commercialization of fluorescence methodologies and their extension into the clinical and biomedical disciplines.

Gregorio Weber’s original and lifelong motivation was to use fluorescence methods to probe the nature of proteins and in addition to his contributions to the fluorescence field, he was one of the true pioneers of protein dynamics. His papers from the 1960s show that even then he regarded proteins as highly dynamic molecules. He rejected the view, common at that time after the appearance of the first x-ray structures, that proteins had a unique and rigid conformation. In an important innovation, he introduced the use of molecular oxygen to quench fluorescence in aqueous solutions, which led to the detection, for the first time and to the surprise of many, of the existence of fast fluctuations in protein structures on the nanosecond time scale. The impact of this work was shown by the increasing interest in experimental and theoretical work in protein dynamics, which followed. Weber’s early description of proteins in solution as “kicking and screaming stochastic molecules” has, in recent years, been fully verified both from theoretical and experimental studies. These contributions were recognized by the American Chemical Society in 1986, which named Weber as the first recipient of the Repligen Award for the Chemistry of Biological Processes.

In the 1970s, initially in collaboration with H.G. Drickamer, Weber combined fluorescence and hydrostatic pressure methods to the study of molecular complexes and proteins. The initial system he studied was the complex formed by isoalloxazine and adenine, one of his original research interests. His observations confirmed the applicability of fluorescence and high-pressure techniques to problems of structure, and particularly dynamics, at the molecular level. He and his collaborators demonstrated that most proteins made up of subunits can be dissociated by the application of hydrostatic pressure, and opened, in this way, a new method to study protein–protein interactions. Quite unexpected properties of protein aggregates were revealed and a new approach to problems in biology and medicine was opened. For example, Weber and his collaborators demonstrated the possibility of destroying the infectivity of viruses, without affecting their immunogenic capacity, by subjecting them to hydrostatic pressure, and thus opened the possibility of developing viral vaccines that contain, without covalent modification, all the antigens present in the original virus.

== Honours ==
Gregorio Weber’s scientific achievements were recognized by many honours and awards. These include election to the US National Academy of Sciences, election to the American Academy of Arts and Sciences, election as a corresponding member to the National Academy of Sciences of Argentina, the first National Lecturer of the Biophysical Society, the Rumford Premium of the American Academy of Arts and Sciences, the ISCO Award for Excellence in Biochemical Instrumentation, the first Repligen Award for the Chemistry of Biological Processes (awarded by the American Chemical Society) and the first International Jablonski Award for Fluorescence Spectroscopy. The Rumford Premium is one of the oldest scientific awards given in the United States. It was created by a bequest to the Academy from Benjamin Thompson, Count Rumford, in 1796 - previously awardees include J. Willard Gibbs, A.A. Michelson, Thomas Edison, Robert W. Wood, Percy Bridgman, Irving Langmuir, Enrico Fermi, S. Chandrasekhar, Hans Bethe, Lars Onsager and other highly original thinkers. The Rumford award committee recommended that the 1979 award be given to two physicists, Robert L. Mills and Chen Ning Yang, for their joint work on the theory of gauge invariance of the electromagnetic field, and to Gregorio Weber, “Acknowledged to be the person responsible for modern developments in the theory and application of fluorescent techniques to chemistry and biochemistry”.

To honour Gregorio Weber, the "Weber Symposia" are held approximately every three years. Recent symposia were held in Búzios, Brazil in 2017, and in Punta del Este, Uruguay in 2023.
