= Davi Wornel =

Italian singer-songwriter

Davi Wornel (born May 3, 1979) is an Italian singer-songwriter, composer, and producer from Reggio Calabria, Italy.

He has performed in the Latin American Christian music scene, as well as gospel, and later working in the genres of pop, soul, rock, and Latin music.

He has performed songs written by Juan Gabriel, Emilio Estefan, and Kike Santander.

He has collaborated with artists such as Claude McKnight (Take 6), Ivana Spagna, Lucía Méndez, John Schlitt (Petra), and Kim Keyes. His albums have featured musicians Vinnie Colaiuta, Abraham Laboriel, Michael Landau, Phil Palmer, Phil Maidera, Jerry McPherson, Marcello Surace, Carmelo Labate, and Max Rosati.

== Early childhood ==
In his childhood, he participated in the musical Il Ballo del Qua Qua by Al Bano and Romina. The following year, he attended a modern dance course with Federica Ferrari, the founder of the National Dance Academy in Rome.

He later moved to Rome, where he studied music, and took a singing course with Elizabeth Sabine, known for working with artists like Axl Rose (Guns N' Roses), Dave Mustaine (Megadeth), and Michael Sweet (Stryper).

=== 2004–2006 ===
On December 18, 2004, he released his first single "Il Centurione", an original song written by Michele Maggi and Ciferri Rosita. "Il Centurione" was a preview of his first Spanish album Uno Contigo. On January 4, 2005, the Italian version Uno con Te was released. The album included the song "Tiempo" written by composer Kike Santander. That same year, he released the single '"Il bambino che eri tu", written by Luca Maggiore.

On June 12, 2006, he produced the album Musica e Vita, which was distributed in Italy. The album features songs including "Solo l'amore", "Nascosto in Te", and "Ti prometto".

=== 2007–2008 ===
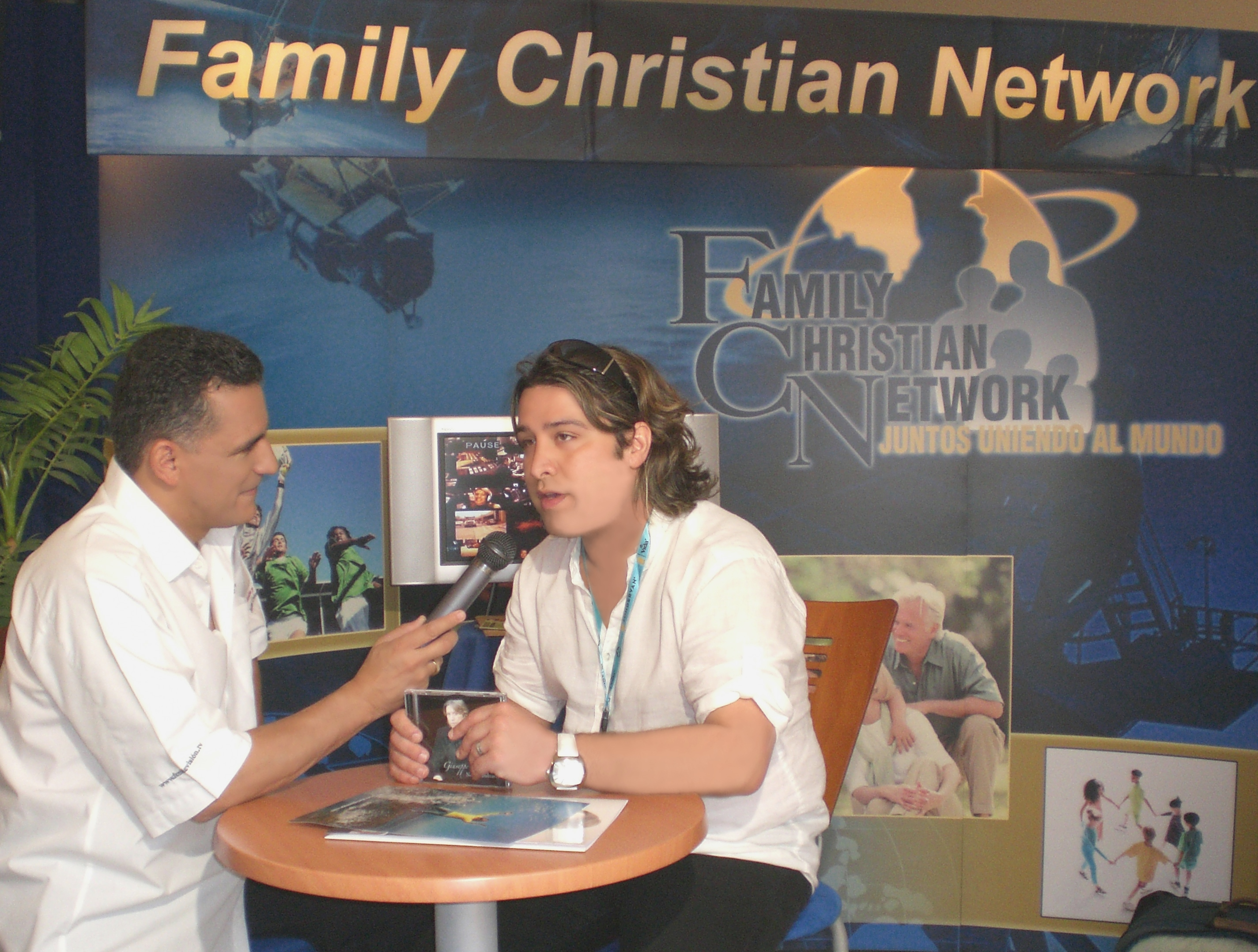
Wornel on Family Christian Network in 2007

In March 2007, he released the single "Bendice tu enemigo", a traditional Latin song blending merengue and cumbia, written with Cuban composer Frank Marcos and arranged by Latin American singer-songwriter Gustavo Lima, formerly of Los Iracundos.

Another single was the Italian rock ballad "So che ci sei", featuring musicians Vinnie Colaiuta, Max Rosati, and Abraham Laboriel.

In June, he began touring in Latin America, stopping in Argentina, Honduras, El Salvador, and Mexico.

=== 2009–2011 ===
On August 10, 2009, Mexican producer Mario Quintero released a pop dance song titled "Amor y nada más". In October 2010, he released the Christmas album Merry Christmas, which includes seven Christmas songs.

=== 2012–2014 ===
In September 2012, he began collaborating with John Schlitt, lead singer of the rock band Petra, a well known Christian rock band, recording Praise The Lord (Spanish version Gloria al Señor), influenced by 1970-era rock.

In September 2013, Wornel was invited to the Venice Film Festival with Mexican actress Lucía Méndez to present the film Intrepido by Gianni Amelio and Antonio Albanese.

On January 12 of the same year, Wornel met Claude McKnight, leader of Take 6, and they produced a duet, "Up Where We Belong", a song from the movie An Officer and A Gentleman. The song was a tribute to Joe Cocker and was recorded in Los Angeles.

=== 2015–2016 ===
In February 2015, he produced the album Bailan for singer Lucía Méndez.

In 2016, he worked with Manny Montes on the track "A Tu Lado".

== Discography ==
=== Albums ===
- 2004 – Uno Contigo (Vida Music Records)
- 2005 – Uno Con te (Vida Music Records)
- 2017 – Latido de Amor (Vida Music Records)

=== Singles ===
- 2004 – Il Centurione (Vida Music Records)
- 2005 – El Centurión (Vida Music Records)
- 2006 – Il bambino che eri tu (Vida Music Records)
- 2007 – O Happy Day (Sparrow Records)
- 2009 – Amor Y Nada Más (Warner Chappell Music)
- 2012 – Praise The Lord – Wornel ft. John Schlitt (Sony Music Entertainment)
- 2012 – Gloria al Señor – Wornel ft. John Schlitt (Sony Music Entertainment)
- 2016 – A tu Lado (Vida Music Records)

=== Compilations ===
- 2007 – The Mercy Project – Christmas (Sony Music Entertainment)
- 2012 – Una vida con propósito (Vida Music Records)
- 2014 – Music For Life (Mondadori)
- 2016 – Love In Music (Mondadori)
