= Joseph R. Lakowicz =

American biochemist

Joseph Raymond Lakowicz (born 1948 in Philadelphia) is an American biochemist . He is a professor at the school of medicine of the University of Maryland in Baltimore and director of the Center for Fluorescence Spectroscopy and author of the standard work in this field, which was published in 2006 in the third edition.

== Life ==
Joseph Raymond Lakowicz, Jr. was born in 1948 in Philadelphia, Pennsylvania . He studied in the late 1960s at La Salle College in Philadelphia (now La Salle University) biology, but later switched to chemistry; B.Sc. 1970. He then studied at the University of Illinois - including Gregorio Weber, a key pioneer in the field of fluorescence spectroscopy – where he received his doctorate in 1973. From 1973 to 1974 he was a postdoctoral student at the department of biochemistry at the University of Oxford in England . Upon his return, he became assistant professor of biochemistry at the University of Minnesota and moved to the University of Maryland in Baltimore in 1980, where he has been professor of biochemistry and molecular biology since 1984 . In 1988 he became director of the Center for Fluorescence Spectroscopy of the university's school of medicine . Research focus is fluorescence and its application in spectroscopy, microscopy and imaging .

Amongst others, Lakowicz coined the term fluorescence lifetime imaging microscopy (FLIM) and in the mid-1990s his laboratory was involved in first publications on the experimental application of light fluorescence quenching with time-delayed light pulses. One of the co-authors was Stefan Hell, of that time based thereon STED microscopy developed, which he first in 1999 was able to realize experimentally.

In 1983, the first edition of his textbook Principles of Fluorescence Spectroscopy, which became the standard work in this area in the following years and 2006 already appeared in the third edition (5th corrected print 2010). He is also the founder of the Journal of Fluorescence and the Journal of Biomedical Optics .

== Works (selection) ==
- Principles of Fluorescence Spectroscopy. (1st Edition in 1983, 2nd Edition in 1999) 3rd Edition, Springer, 2006, ISBN 978-0-387-31278-1.
- Editor of: Topics in Fluorescence Spectroscopy. (Vol. 1, 1991; Vol. 12, 2007), Kluwer Academic/Springer, 1991–2007.
- With Jian Zhang: Emerging Applications of Colloidal Noble Metals in Cancer Nanomedicine. Future Medicine, London 2012, ISBN 978-1-78084-072-7.
