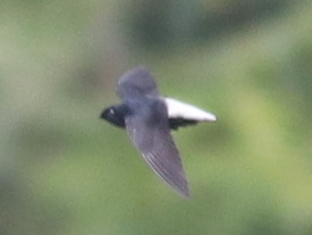
- Silver-rumped spinetail (Rhaphidura leucopygialis)

Scientific classification
- Kingdom: Animalia
- Phylum: Chordata
- Class: Aves
- Order: Apodiformes
- Family: Apodidae
- Tribe: Chaeturini
- Genus: Rhaphidura; Oates, 1883

Type species
- Acanthylis leucopygialis Blyth, 1849

= Rhaphidura =

Genus of birds

Rhaphidura is a genus of swift in the family Apodidae.

It contains the following species:

- Silver-rumped spinetail (Rhaphidura leucopygialis)
- Sabine's spinetail (Rhaphidura sabini)
