= Sabine Piller =

- Born: 8 January 1970 (age 56); Vienna, Austria
- Education: University of Vienna (1991); University of Alabama at Birmingham (1993; 2000); Australian National University (1998)
- Scientific career
- Fields: Medical Science
- Workplaces: Western Sydney University; Westmead Institute for Medical Research
- Doctoral advisor: G. Cox & P. Gage

Sabine Piller (born 8 January 1970) is a professor of medical research at Western Sydney University and senior research officer at the Westmead Institute for Medical Research.

== Early life and education ==
Sabine Piller was born in Vienna, Austria, on 8 January 1970. She was the oldest daughter in a working-class family of four; her father worked as an airplane engineer and her mother worked as a secretary. She first developed her interest in science during childhood, after snorkeling and deep-sea diving with her family.

During her high school education, Piller developed a strong foundation in physics and chemistry. When she moved on to the University of Vienna, she expanded her scientific foundation by taking courses in botany, zoology, genetics, and microbiology. After visiting a friend in the United States, Piller decided to apply for a scholarship from the Austrian Ministry of Science and Research in order to continue her education in America. Following the completion of her undergraduate degree, she was awarded further funding to pursue a Master of Science degree.

Piller received a Master of Science degree in marine physiology from the University of Alabama at Birmingham, where she worked with biologists David Krauss and Jeannette Doeller. Together, they studied the marine crab species Callinectes sapidus and Callinectes similis, which both live in estuarine habitats. She found that these species had distinctive gill tissue, which explained why one crab species was able to live through various levels of salinity while the other species was limited to a certain level of salinity.

Piller decided to take a year-long academic hiatus before pursuing her doctorate degree at the Australian National University, where she worked with neuroscientist Peter Gage and biochemist Graeme Cox studying viruses and ion channels. Her research focused on a virus protein from HIV called Vpr; her work was the first research to show that a HIV protein could function as an ion channel. Piller and her team speculated that this could be linked to AIDS dementia symptoms in HIV patients. The research she conducted as a part of her doctorate degree spurred her interest in HIV, which led her to the Centre of AIDS Research in Birmingham for her post-doctoral studies. During her post-doctoral studies, Piller studied a different part of HIV, a glycoprotein called gp41.

== Career ==
Before pursuing her doctorate degree, Piller took an academic hiatus from 1993-1994, during which she returned to University of Vienna to work at their Neurophysiology Department. After her doctorate degree and post-doctoral studies, she lectured at University of South Wales as a part of their medicine department. Piller also worked with the John Curtin School of Medical Research, where she became a visiting fellow with their Division of Biochemistry and Molecular Biology. Currently, Piller is a part of Western Sydney University School of Biomedical and Health Sciences as a Senior Lecturer in Physiology. In addition, she occupies an adjunct position with the Western Sydney University School of Medicine. As a part of these two positions, she heads ongoing research alongside her research team. Apart from her experience with various universities, Piller also stands as senior research officer of the HIV Protein Functions Group at Westmead Institute for Medical Research.

== Selected articles ==
- Piller, S. C., & Henry, R. P. (1995). A comparison of the gill physiology of two euryhaline crab species, Callinectes sapidus and.. Journal of Experimental Biology, 198(2), 349.
- Piller, S. C., Jans, P., Gage, P. W., & Jans, D. A. (1998). Extracellular HIV-1 virus protein R causes a large inward current and cell death in cultured.. Proceedings of the National Academy of Sciences of the United States of America, 95(8), 4595.
- Willemsen, N. M., Hitchen, E. M., Bodetti, T. J., Apolloni, A., Warrilow, D., Piller, S. C., & Harrich, D. (2006). Protein methylation is required to maintain optimal HIV-1 infectivity. Retrovirology, 3, 92–15.
- Micoli, K. J., Mamaeva, O., Piller, S. C., Barker, J. L., Pan, G., Hunter, E., & McDonald, J. M. (2006). Point mutations in the C-terminus of HIV-1 gp160 reduce apoptosis and calmodulin binding without affecting viral replication. Virology, 344(2), 468–479.
- Anna Hearps, Melinda Pryor, Henna Kuusisto, Stephen Rawlinson, Sabine Piller, & David Jans. (2007). The Biarsenical Dye Lumioâ¢ Exhibits a Reduced Ability to Specifically Detect Tetracysteine-Containing Proteins Within Live Cells. Journal of Fluorescence, 17(6), 593–597.
- Caly, L., Saksena, N. K., Piller, S. C., & Jans, D. A. (2008). Impaired nuclear import and viral incorporation of Vpr derived from a HIV long-term non-progressor. Retrovirology, 5, 1–7.
- Hearps, A. C., Wagstaff, K. M., Piller, S. C., & Jans, D. A. (2008). The N-Terminal Basic Domain of the HIV-1 Matrix Protein Does Not Contain a Conventional Nuclear Localization Sequence But Is Required for DNA Binding and Protein Self-Association. Biochemistry, 47(7), 2199–2210.
- Leon Caly, David Jans, & Sabine Piller. (2009). Proteolytic Cleavage of HIV-1 GFP-Vpr Fusions at Novel Sites Within Virions and Living Cells: Concerns for Intracellular Trafficking Studies. Journal of Fluorescence, 19(3), 567–573.
- Lauto, A., Mawad, D., Barton, M., Gupta, A., Piller, S. C., & Hook3, J. (2010). Photochemical tissue bonding with chitosan adhesive films. BioMedical Engineering OnLine, 9, 47–57.
- Lauto, A., Mawad, D., Barton, M., Piller, S. C., & Longo, L. (2011). Chitosan Adhesive Films for Photochemical Tissue Bonding. AIP Conference Proceedings, 1364(1), 87–93.
- Plett, K. L., Raposo, A. E., Bullivant, S., Anderson, I. C., Piller, S. C., & Plett, J. M. (2017). Root morphogenic pathways in Eucalyptus grandis are modified by the activity of protein arginine methyltransferases. BMC Plant Biology, 17, 1–16.
- Raposo, A. E., & Piller, S. C. (2018). Protein arginine methylation: an emerging regulator of the cell cycle. Cell Division, 13, 1.

== Awards and honors ==
- Frank Fenner Medal for Best Ph.D. Thesis (1999)
- Young Investigator Award from the Centre for Immunology at St. Vincent's Hospital (2000)
