= Edward Sabine =

Irish astronomer, geophysicist, ornithologist and explorer

Sir Edward Sabine KCB FRS FRSE FRAS
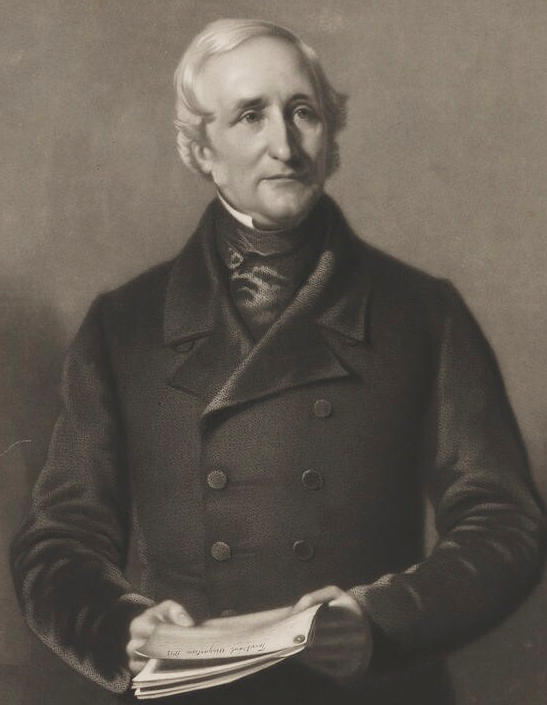
- Portrait by Stephen Pearce, 1850

30th President of the Royal Society
- In office 30 November 1861 – 30 November 1871
- Preceded by: Sir Benjamin Brodie
- Succeeded by: Sir George Airy

Personal details
- Born: 14 October 1788 Dublin, Ireland
- Died: 26 June 1883 (aged 94) East Sheen, London, England
- Resting place: St Peter Churchyard, Tewin
- Spouse: Elizabeth Leeves (m. 1828)
- Relatives: Joseph Sabine (brother); Joseph Sabine (grandfather)
- Education: Royal Military Academy
- Occupation: Astronomer, geophysicist
- Expeditions: First Ross expedition (1818); First Parry expedition (1819)
- Awards: Royal Society of London's Copley Medal (1821); Knight Commander of the Order of the Bath (1869)

Military service
- Branch: British Army
- Years of service: 1803–1877
- Rank: Major-General
- Wars: Spanish Revolutionary War; Anglo-American War

Sir Edward Sabine (/ˈseɪbɪn/; 14 October 1788 – 26 June 1883) was an Irish physicist, geodesist,astronomer, geophysicist, ornithologist, polar explorer, soldier, and the 30th president of the Royal Society.

He led the effort to establish a system of magnetic observatories in various parts of British territory all over the globe. Much of his life was devoted to their direction and to analysing their observations. Other research focused on the birds of Greenland, ocean temperatures, the Gulf Stream, barometric measurement of heights, arc of the meridian, glacial transport of rocks, the volcanoes of the Hawaiian Islands and various points of meteorology.

== Early life ==
Edward Sabine was born 14 October 1788 in Great Britain St. (Parnell St.), Dublin. His father, Joseph Sabine, was a member of a prominent Anglo-Irish family who was visiting his Irish relatives at the time of his son's birth. The family connections with Ireland can be traced back to the 17th century. His mother, Sarah Hunt was the daughter of Rowland Hunt of Shropshire. His Great Grandfather was also named Joseph Sabine. He was an English settler who owned land in Killmolin, Wicklow.

However his mother Sarah died when he was just one month old. He was the couple's fifth son and ninth child. One of his older brothers was naturalist Joseph Sabine (1770–1837). In fact, it is said that Edward developed his love for science, that he would later turn into a career, through conversations with his brother Joseph Sabine, and also his brother-in-law Henry Browne. His interest in the sciences ranged from ornithology, horticulture and the earth sciences.

His father returned to their home of Tewin in Hertfordshire soon after his birth.

He was educated at Marlow and at the Royal Military Academy, Woolwich. In 1803, at age 15, he obtained a commission in the Royal Artillery as a second lieutenant, becoming a captain ten years later and eventually attaining the rank of general in 1870.

== Serving in the army ==
Sabine's family had a long history of serving in the military. For example, his great grandfather Joseph Sabine was in the army of William III (qv) in Ireland; he ranked as major general in the Royal Welch Fusiliers. Edward Sabine followed this tradition at fourteen years old when he attended to Royal Military Academy at Woolwich. He was named a lieutenant in the Royal Artillery in December 1803 and was sent to Gibraltar in 1804. He became a second captain when he was sent to Quebec and fought the Americans in the Niagara campaign.

Sabine was stationed in Gibraltar during the Peninsular War, but it was in the War of 1812 that he had his first taste of combat. On 24 June 1813, while traveling to Canada, the English packet ship Manchester was attacked by an American privateer. In the ensuing battle Sabine, who was the Manchester's astronomer, reportedly handled a gun "to good effect". The ship was captured and after his release Sabine travelled from Halifax to Quebec. During the times of 1813 – 14, Sabine fought along the St Lawrence River in Upper and Lower Canada.

Sabine continued to see action in the War of 1812, particularly in the Niagara Campaign in August and September 1814. Under George Gordon Drummond he commanded the batteries at the Siege of Fort Erie and was mentioned twice in dispatches. He returned to England and devoted the remainder of his life to the pursuits of astronomy, terrestrial magnetism and physical geography.

== Sabine's scientific career ==
Sabine was a renowned scientist known for his work on Earth's magnetism, magnetic instruments, and polar exploration. In 1818, he joined the North-West Passage expedition with John Ross as an astronomer and scientific officer. He made significant observations, including measurements of tides, currents, and magnetic properties. Despite a dispute with Ross over credit, Sabine contributed a report on biological findings, including a new bird species, named Larus sabini after him by his brother Joseph.

In 1819 Sabine returned to the Arctic with William Parry, conducting a magnetic survey on their expedition to Melville Island. His work earned him the Copley Medal in 1821, and Parry named a peninsula after him. Sabine's ongoing research in magnetism led him to become a central figure in the "magnetic crusade", a global effort to study Earth's magnetic field. In 1821, he also embarked on a scientific voyage to the South Atlantic and Caribbean, later conducting studies in Greenland, where Sabine Island was named in his honour.

Sabine received support for his magnetic research from Sir John Barrow, secretary of the Admiralty, and the Royal Society. From 1830 to 1837, stationed in Ireland, Sabine worked with Professor Humphrey Lloyd on a magnetic survey of Ireland, later extended to Scotland and England. Many of the instruments used were developed by Lloyd and Sabine and built by Howard Grubb & Son in Dublin. He also served as the secretary of the Royal Society from 1827 to 1829.

In 1839 Sabine played a key role in securing support for an Antarctic expedition led by James Clark Ross aboard HMS Erebus, with Capt. Francis Crozier commanding HMS Terror. The expedition set up geomagnetic observatories in the Southern Hemisphere, providing valuable data on terrestrial magnetism. Sabine was skilled at managing large datasets, employing clerks at the Royal Military Academy at Woolwich. Despite criticism for his tight control over the project, he identified periodic magnetic phenomena.

Sabine also had a professional dispute with G. B. Airy at the Royal Observatory, during which he successfully advocated for Kew to become the central hub for magnetic observatories. His leadership, interpersonal skills, and ability to secure funding helped him build a broad international network.

He held various leadership roles at the Royal Society, including Foreign Secretary in 1845, Treasurer in 1850, and President from 1861 to 1871. Promoted to General in 1870, Sabine received numerous prestigious awards, including a DCL from Oxford, an LLD from Cambridge, and the KCB (Knight Commander of the Bath), along with several foreign honours.

== More detailed analysis of his scientific expeditions. ==
=== Ross expedition ===
Sabine was elected a Fellow of the Royal Society in April 1818, and it was thanks to the society's recommendations that he was invited to take part that year in Captain John Ross's first Arctic expedition. As the expedition's appointed astronomer, Sabine was told to assist Ross "in making such observations as may tend to the improvement of geography and navigation and the advancement of science in general".

Although the principal purpose of the voyage was to find the Northwest Passage, several objects of scientific curiosity were deemed worthy of investigation, such as the location of the Earth's north magnetic pole and the behaviour of pendulums in high latitudes which provided information on the shape of the earth. Sabine also made ornithological observations.

The expedition failed to discover the Northwest Passage and ended in controversy. When Ross found his progress through Lancaster Sound blocked by sea ice, he turned around and headed back to Britain, much to the annoyance of the other members of the expedition. Both Sabine and Ross's second-in-command, William Edward Parry, doubted the very existence of the so-called Croker Mountains, which it seems only Ross saw. Objecting to Ross's precipitate retreat, Sabine later recalled his "very visible mortification at having come away from a place which I considered as the most interesting in the world for magnetic observations and where my expectations had been raised to the highest pitch, without having had an opportunity of making them".

To make matters worse, a very public row broke out between the two men when they arrived home. Sabine objected when Ross claimed the credit for certain magnetic observations. He also accused Ross of stealing magnetic measurements without giving him due credit and of refusing to allow him enough time on the expedition to take accurate readings. Sabine was later able to recover credit for them.

The results of Sabine's magnetic researches were published in the Philosophical Transactions of the Royal Society. Although he viewed his work as confirming and extending the discoveries of earlier "magnetic collectors", he stressed the need for the multiplication and repetition of observations. Sabine was a diligent and careful scientist. He generally avoided theoretical discussion in his writings, believing that a true understanding of terrestrial magnetism would only be arrived at after exhaustive observations had been made on a global scale.

=== Parry expedition ===
The following year, in May 1819, both Edward and Joseph Sabine returned to the Arctic as members of Lieutenant William Edward Parry's expedition in search of the Northwest Passage aboard the Hecla. The Admiralty once again instructed the participants to gather such scientific data as "must prove most valuable and interesting to the science of our country". They were to pay particular attention to magnetic measurements, especially the possible interactions between magnetic needles, atmospheric electricity and the aurora borealis. They were also to attempt to establish the location of the Earth's North Magnetic Pole, then believed to lie somewhere along the western shore of Baffin Bay.

Like Ross, Parry did not find the passage, but he did set a new record for the "furthest west", which stood for several decades. To alleviate the tedium of the long Arctic winter, Sabine produced a weekly newspaper for the amusement of the crew. Known as the North Georgia Gazette and Winter Chronicle, it ran for twenty-one issues. Due to public demand, it was actually published on their return to Britain, much to Sabine's surprise.

During this expedition, which lasted until November 1820, Sabine noted that changes in magnetic intensity had taken place since his previous visit. He attributed such changes to either a fluctuation in the Earth's magnetic intensity or the shifting positions of the terrestrial magnetic poles. For his work in the Arctic, Sabine received the Copley Medal from the Royal Society in 1821.

== Geodetic measurement ==
Sabine next turned his attention to geodesy, which had already engaged his attention during the first of his Arctic voyages and in particular the determination of the length of the seconds pendulum. By measuring the length of a seconds pendulum in different latitudes, one can calculate the "oblateness" of the Earth, the degree to which the "figure of the Earth" departs from perfect sphericity. Attempts to do this had been made in the eighteenth century, but it was not until Sabine's lifetime that precision instruments were available to allow sufficiently accurate measurements to be made.

Sabine threw himself into the task with his usual diligence. Between 1821 and 1823 he travelled halfway around the world with his pendulums and carried out innumerable measurements at many different latitudes including the intertropical coasts of Africa and the Americas. He also returned to the Arctic, journeying up the eastern coast of Greenland with Captain Douglas Clavering on Parry's old ship the Griper. Observations were made at Little Pendulum Island, in latitude 74°30' and among the snows of Spitsbergen. Sabine Island was named in his honour during this expedition.

The results of his research were published in 1825. They represented the most accurate assessment of the figure of the earth that had ever been made. Not content to rest on his laurels, Sabine conducted further pendulum experiments throughout the 1820s, determining the relative lengths of the second's pendulum in Paris, London, Greenwich and Altona.

== Leave of absence ==
On 31 December 1827 he was promoted 1st captain. Between 1827 and 1829, the Duke of Wellington granted Sabine general leave of absence from the army on the understanding "that he was usefully employed in scientific pursuits". He acted as one of the secretaries of the Royal Society. In 1828 he was appointed a scientific adviser to the Admiralty, following the abolition of the Board of Longitude. But his leave from the army did not last very long. Political agitation in Ireland necessitated an increased military presence in the country and in 1830 Sabine was recalled to military duty. He remained in his native land for the next seven years, but he did not allow his new military duties to interrupt his scientific endeavours. He continued his pendulum investigations and in 1834 commenced a systematic magnetic survey of Ireland, the first of its kind in what was then the United Kingdom. It was extended to Scotland in 1836 and to England the following year.

== Scientific advisor to the admiralty ==
Upon the abolition of the Board of Longitude in 1828, it was arranged that three scientific advisers to the Admiralty should be nominated from the council of the Royal Society. Sabine, Michael Faraday and Thomas Young were chosen. Sabine's appointment was violently attacked by Charles Babbage in a pamphlet entitled Reflections on the Decline of Science in England and on Some of its Causes. Sabine, however, refused to be drawn into the controversy.

== Magnetic crusade ==
During the decades that the Royal Navy and Royal Society devoted much energy to magnetic variation and its problems, magnetism came to be seen as an eminently "British" science. There was intense interest in figuring out what many called "the great remaining physical mystery since Newton's work on gravitation". By the beginning of the nineteenth century, it was widely recognised that the Earth's magnetic field was continually changing over time in a complicated way that interfered with compass readings. It was a mystery which some scientists believed might be associated with weather patterns.

To solve this mystery once and for all, a number of physicists recommended that a magnetic survey of the entire globe be carried out. Sabine was one of the instigators of this "Magnetic Crusade", urging the government to establish magnetic observatories throughout the empire. He also recruited many associates to the cause, most notably James Clark Ross, a nephew of Sir John's, the German explorer Alexander von Humboldt, the Astronomer Royal George Airy at Greenwich Observatory, and Francis Ronalds, Honorary Director of the Kew Observatory.

A committee, of which Sabine was a prominent member, was established to work out the details. Suitable locations for the observatories were selected in both hemispheres and representations were made to dispatch an expedition to the Southern Ocean to carry out a magnetic survey of the Antarctic. In the spring of 1839, the government approved the scheme. Observatories were to be established at Toronto, St. Helena, Cape Town, Tasmania and at stations to be determined by the East India Company, while other nations were invited to co-operate. Sabine was appointed to superintend the entire operation.

Most of these observatories were of limited size and were dismantled as soon as the initial survey was complete, but the one founded by Sabine at Toronto in 1840 is still in existence. Originally housed in a modest building at the newly established University of Toronto, it was called the Toronto Magnetic and Meteorological Observatory. It was the first scientific institution in the country.

The birthplace of Canadian astronomy was a simple log building held together with copper nails and brass fastenings. Non-magnetic materials were used to avoid the problem of "local attraction". A second room was built to house a telescope, which was used to make accurate time readings based on the movement of the Sun and stars. The modern stone observatory was erected in 1855.

In the early years there was no way to take continuous readings: everything had to be done by hand. Thousands of painstaking observations were taken by the staff— sometimes as frequently as every five minutes. These observations were all carefully scrutinised by Sabine back in Britain. By 1846, photo-magnetographs had been developed by Francis Ronalds and Airy's associate Charles Brooke to continuously record the magnet's movements using the recent invention of photography. The new instruments were first installed at the Toronto Observatory in the later 1840s as well as at Kew and Greenwich.

In 1852, Sabine recognised from the Toronto records that magnetic variations could be divided into a regular diurnal cycle and an irregular portion. The irregularity correlated very closely with fluctuations in the number of sunspots, whose cyclic nature had been discovered in 1844 by the German amateur astronomer Heinrich Schwabe. Sabine was the first to recognise that solar disturbances affected the Earth's magnetic environment. On 6 April 1852, he announced that the Sun's 11-year sunspot cycle was "absolutely identical" to the Earth's 11-year geomagnetic cycle.

The following year, Sabine also made a similar correlation with the Moon, establishing that that celestial body too had an influence on the Earth's magnetic field. He concluded that the Moon must have a significant magnetic field of its own to cause such an effect. But for once he was mistaken; the effect is actually the result of gravitational tides in the ionosphere.

Throughout the 1840s and 1850s Sabine continued to superintend the operation of magnetic observatories throughout the British Empire. The result was Sabine's magnum opus, as complete a magnetic survey of the globe as was then humanly possible.

== Later life ==
Throughout his long life Sabine received numerous decorations for his contributions to science. In 1849, the Royal Society awarded him one of its gold medals for his work on terrestrial magnetism. Sabine was president of the society from November 1861 until his resignation in November 1871. He was a member of the Royal Commission of 1868–1869, for standardising weights and measures. Both Oxford and Cambridge bestowed honorary doctorates on him. He was a fellow of the Linnean Society and the Royal Astronomical Society and president of the British Association for the Advancement of Science.

In 1867 he was elected a foreign member of the Royal Swedish Academy of Sciences and a Foreign Honorary Member of the American Academy of Arts and Sciences. He became a Knight Commander of the Order of the Bath in 1869. He retired from the army on full pay in 1877, having been promoted full general on 7 February 1870. He had been a member of the American Philosophical Society since 1841.

He married Elizabeth Juliana Leeves (1807–79) in 1826. She was an accomplished woman in her own right, she had assisted her husband in his scientific endeavours for more than half a century. Her four-volume translation of Alexander von Humboldt's monumental textbook of geophysics Kosmos, was published from 1849 to 1858. Edward Sabine wrote an introduction and added notes to this. They translated Humboldt's Aspects of nature (1850), Meteorological essays by Francois Arago. She was also responsible for the English translation of Ferdinand von Wrangel's Narrative of an Expedition to the Polar Sea, working from a German translation by Georg von Engelhardt.

Sabine authored numerous books, wrote hundreds of scientific papers (103 of which are cataloged in the Royal Society's collection), and contributed articles and literature reviews on topics related to Terrestrial Physics.

Sir Edward Sabine died aged 94 in his home in Richmond, Surrey on 26 June 1883, and was buried in the family vault at Tewin, Hertfordshire. His wife is also buried there.

A portrait of Sabine can be found at the Royal Society, while another, painted by G. F. Watts, RA, in 1876, hangs in the Royal Artillery mess in Woolwich. Additionally, there is an oil painting of him by Stephen Pearce (1850) in the National Portrait Gallery in London.

== Namesake ==
Sabine is the namesake of Sabine's gull, Sabine's puffback and Sabine's spinetail.

Geographical features named after Sabine include Sabine Land, the Sabine Islands and Sabinebukta (all in Svalbard), Mount Sabine among Antarctica's Admiralty Mountains; Sabine Island on Greenland's east coast; and the lunar Sabine crater.

== See also ==
- List of presidents of the Royal Society

Professional and academic associations
Preceded by Benjamin Collins Brodie	30th President of the Royal Society; 1861–1871	Succeeded by George Biddell Airy
