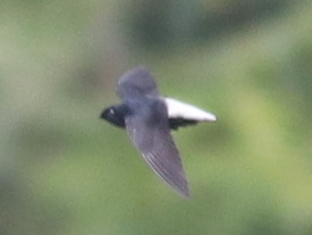

Conservation status
- Least Concern (IUCN 3.1)

Scientific classification
- Kingdom: Animalia
- Phylum: Chordata
- Class: Aves
- Clade: Strisores
- Order: Apodiformes
- Family: Apodidae
- Genus: Rhaphidura
- Species: R. leucopygialis

Binomial name
- Rhaphidura leucopygialis (Blyth, 1849)

= Silver-rumped spinetail =

Species of bird

The silver-rumped spinetail or silver-rumped needletail (Rhaphidura leucopygialis, sometimes spelled Raphidura leucopygialis) is a species of swift in the family Apodidae. It is found in Brunei, Indonesia, Malaysia, Myanmar, Singapore, and Thailand. Its natural habitat is subtropical or tropical moist lowland forests. Research on the silver- Rumped spine tail has utilized facultative heterothermy, or even torpor, as a physiological mechanism to reduce its metabolic rate and conserve energy in its tropical environment.
