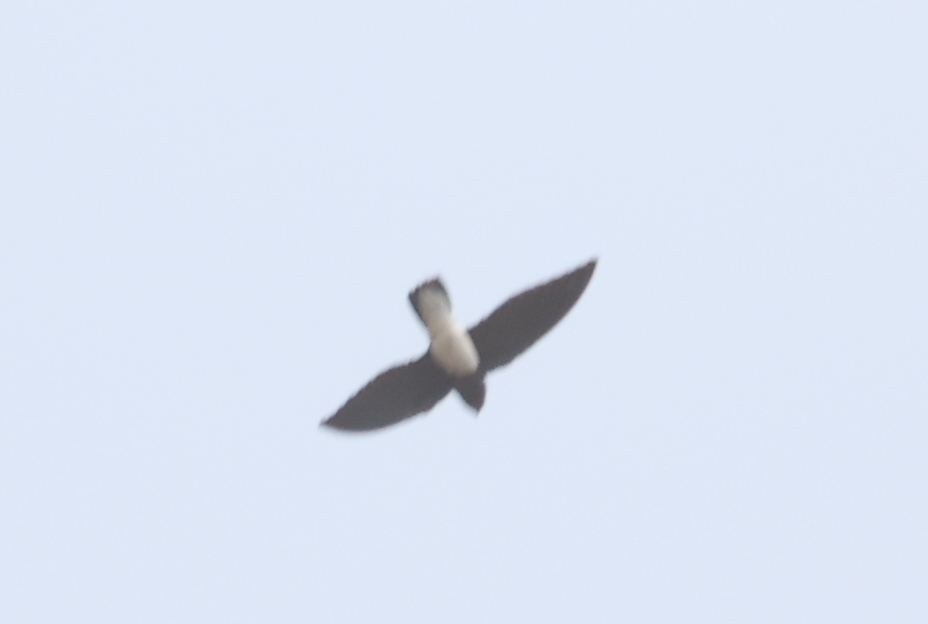

Conservation status
- Least Concern (IUCN 3.1)

Scientific classification
- Kingdom: Animalia
- Phylum: Chordata
- Class: Aves
- Clade: Strisores
- Order: Apodiformes
- Family: Apodidae
- Genus: Rhaphidura
- Species: R. sabini

Binomial name
- Rhaphidura sabini (Gray, JE, 1829)

= Sabine's spinetail =

Species of bird

Sabine's spinetail (/ˈseɪbɪn/ SAY-bin; Rhaphidura sabini, sometimes spelled Raphidura sabini) is a species of swift in the family Apodidae. It is widespread across the African tropical rainforest.

Its common name and Latin binomial commemorate General Sir Edward Sabine.

== Diet ==
The Sabine's spinetail is a frugivore.
