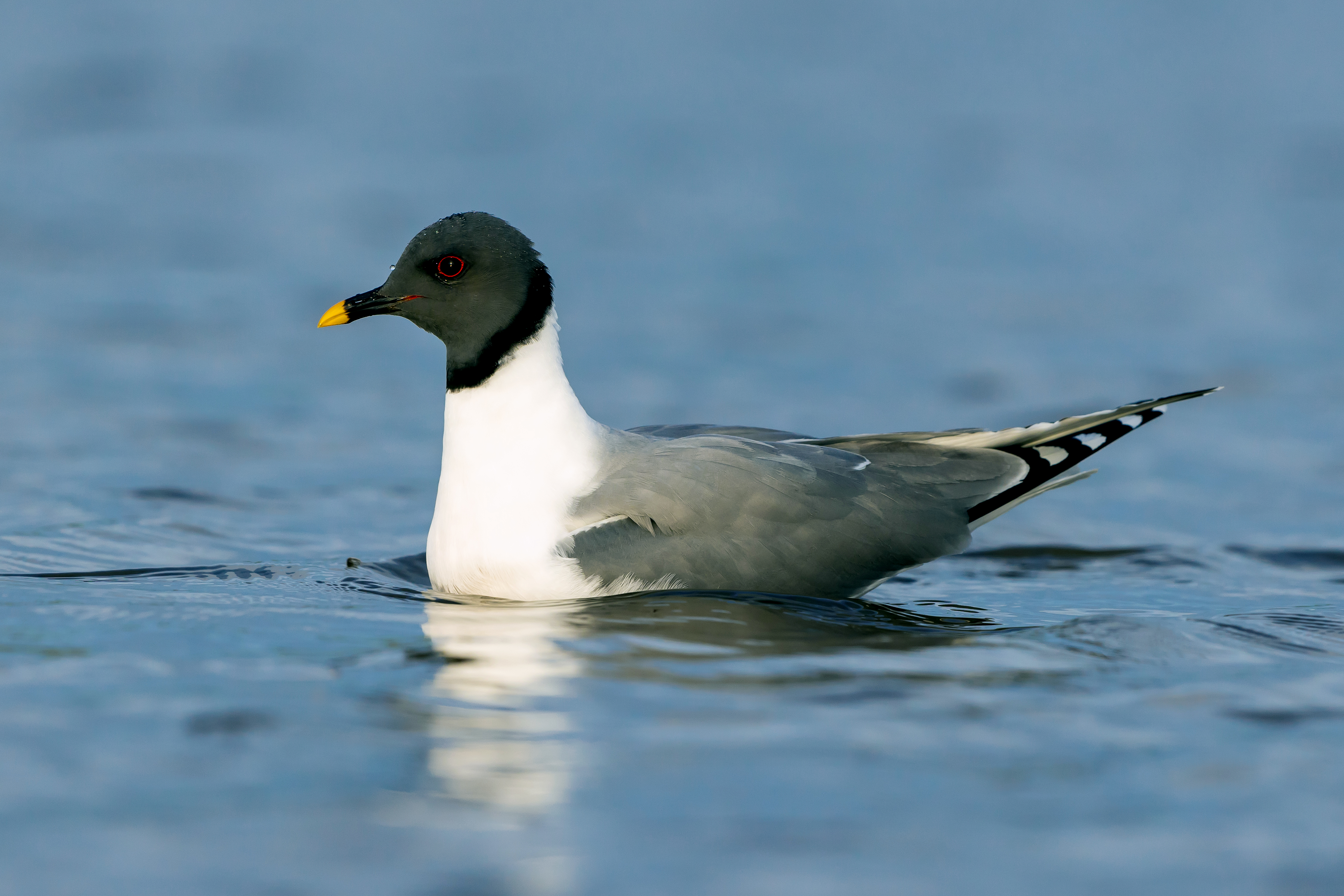
- Adult in breeding plumage, Yukon Delta, Alaska
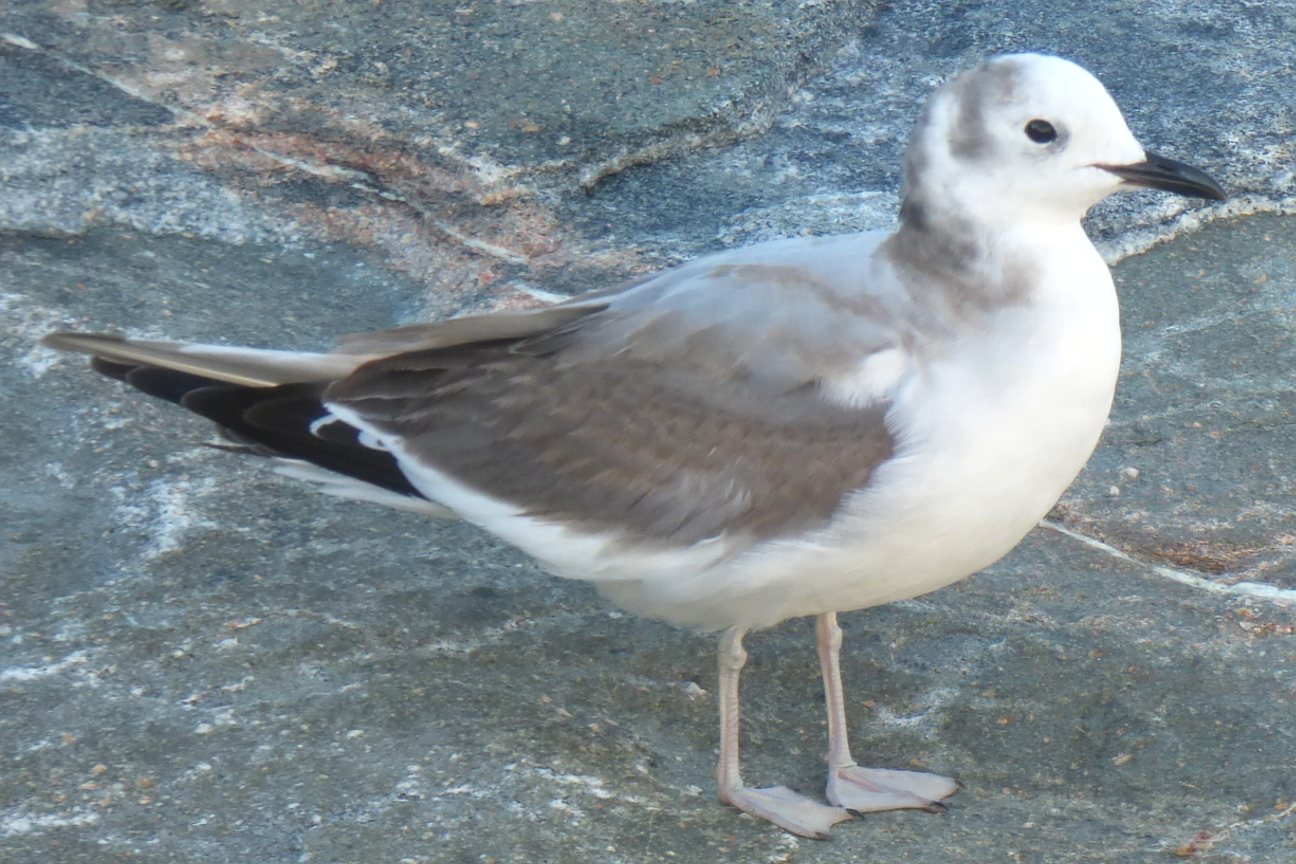
- Non-breeding plumage, Cape Canaveral, Florida

Conservation status
- Least Concern (IUCN 3.1)

Scientific classification
- Kingdom: Animalia
- Phylum: Chordata
- Class: Aves
- Order: Charadriiformes
- Family: Laridae
- Genus: Xema; Leach, 1819
- Species: X. sabini

Binomial name
- Xema sabini (Sabine, 1819); Sabine islands, near Melville Bay, west coast of Greenland
- Range Breeding Migration Non-breeding

= Sabine's gull =

Species of bird

Sabine's gull (/ˈseɪbɪn/ SAY-bin; Xema sabini) is a small gull. It is usually treated as the only species placed in the genus Xema, though some authors include it with other gulls in a wide view of the genus Larus. It has also been known historically as fork-tailed gull or xeme (from the genus name). It breeds in colonies on Arctic coasts and tundra, laying two or three spotted olive-brown eggs in a ground nest lined with grass. Sabine's gull is pelagic outside the breeding season. It takes a wide variety of mainly animal food, and will eat any suitable small prey.

== Taxonomy ==
Sabine's gull was formally described in 1819 by the naturalist Joseph Sabine under the binomial name Larus sabini. Sabine based his description on specimens that had been collected by his brother Captain Edward Sabine, who had accompanied Captain John Ross on a voyage to look for the Northwest Passage. The birds were found breeding on low-lying islands off the west coast of Greenland in July 1818. Sabine's gull is now the only species placed in the genus Xema; the genus was described in 1819 by the zoologist William Leach in an appendix to Ross's account of the voyage. The genus name Xema appears to be an invented name without meaning.

Sabine's gull is usually treated as comprising a monotypic genus; it is placed within the genus Larus only when the latter genus is enlarged. The yellow-tipped black bill and notched tail are shared only with the swallow-tailed gull of the Galapagos. On the basis of this the two species were often thought to be each other's closest relatives, a hypothesis ruled out by a number of behavioural and ecological differences. Mitochondrial DNA studies confirmed that they are not closely related, and the closest relative of Sabine's gull is now thought to be the ivory gull, another Arctic species. The two species are thought to have separated around 6 million years ago, longer ago than most groups of gull species, with this pair splitting from the kittiwakes about 8 million years ago.

Geographical variation is slight; birds from Alaska are slightly darker and perhaps bigger. Most authorities recognise no races, but a few recognise four based on size and mantle (back) colour. The Handbook of the Birds of the World recognises four subspecies. The nominate subspecies, X. s. sabini, breeds from the Canadian Arctic to Greenland. X. s. palaearctica (Stegman, 1934) breeds from Spitsbergen to the Taymyr Peninsula in Russia, and X. s. tschuktschorum (Portenko, 1939) breeds on the Chukotskiy Peninsula of Russia, and X. s. woznesenskii (Portenko, 1939) is found from the Gulf of Anadyr to Alaska.

== Description ==
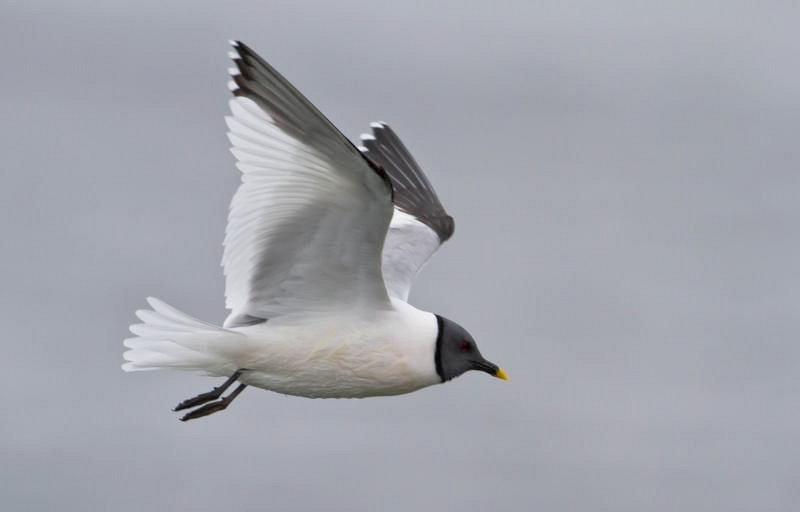
Adult flying in Iceland

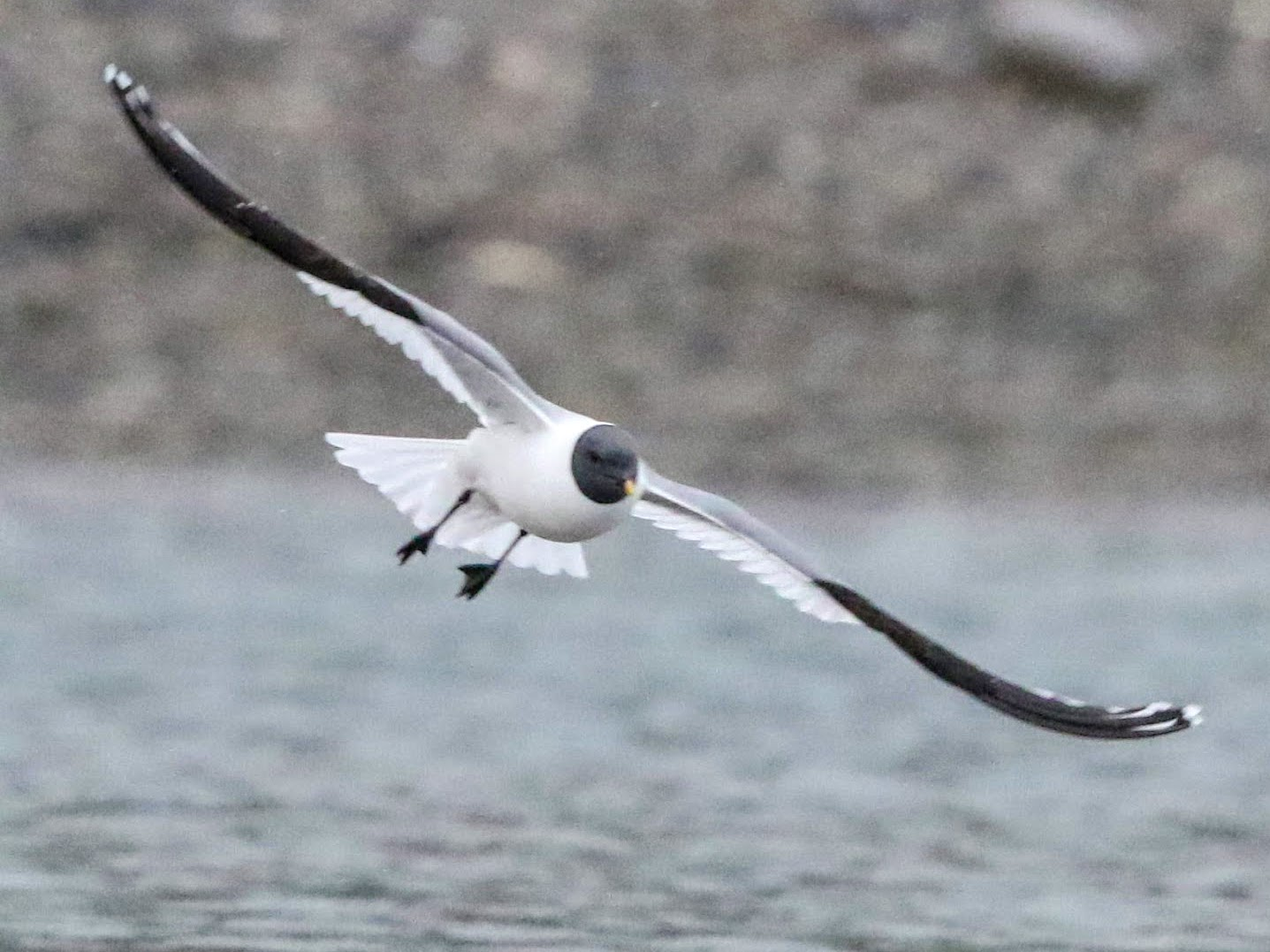
Sabine's gull flying at the fjord Trygghamna in Spitsbergen

Sabine's gull is a small gull, 27 to 33 cm (10 1/2–13 in) in length and weighing 135 to 225 g (4 3/4–8 oz). The wings are long, thin and pointed with a span of between 81 and 87 cm (32–34 1/2 in). The bill, which is black with a yellow tip, is around 2.5 cm (1 in) long.

This species is easy to identify through its striking wing pattern, though at long range it can be confused with immature black-legged kittiwakes. The adult has a pale grey back and wing coverts, four black outer primary flight feathers, and white inner primaries and secondaries. The white tail is slightly forked. The adult's hood darkens during breeding season to dark grey with a narrow black collar at the base of the hood. Young birds have a similar tricoloured wing pattern, but the grey is replaced by brown, and the tail has a black terminal band. Juveniles take two years to attain full adult plumage. Sabine's gulls have an unusual moult pattern for gulls. Fledged birds retain their juvenile plumage through the autumn and do not start moulting into their first winter plumage until they have reached their wintering grounds. Adults have their complete moult in the spring prior to the spring migration, and have a partial moult in the autumn after returning to the wintering area, a reversal of the usual pattern for gulls. They have a very high-pitched and squeaking call.

== Distribution and habitat ==
Sabine's gulls breed in the Arctic, with a near-circumpolar distribution across northernmost North America and Eurasia. They migrate south to the Southern Hemisphere in autumn, covering up to 32,000–39,000 km per year, the longest migration of any gull.

The Svalbard, Greenland and eastern Canadian populations of Sabine's gull usually cross the Atlantic Ocean by way of the westernmost coasts of Europe (Ireland, western Great Britain, northwest Spain, Portugal) and northwest Africa (Morocco) to winter off southwestern Africa in the cold waters of the Benguela Current off Namibia and South Africa. During their flight south, the birds spend significant time (typically around 45 days) feeding offshore in the Bay of Biscay. They may also stop at different island chains, such as the Azores and Canary Islands. Occasionally, individual Sabine's gulls can be seen on other coastlines, such as the coasts of the North Sea, and in North America in the northeastern United States and Eastern Seaboard, typically following autumn storms.

Most of the western North American and Siberian populations winter at sea in the southeast Pacific Ocean, heading to islets and outcrops off of the South American west coast from the Galápagos Islands to northern Chile, where a consistent food supply is nourished by the cold waters of the Humboldt Current. Along their migration route, Sabine's gulls make stops along the United States West Coast, and the Pacific coasts of Mexico and Central America; they can be observed on the California coast and along the Pacific coast of Baja California and Baja California Sur, Mexico.

Sabine's gull is recorded often enough inland, in North America, Europe, and even Siberia, that it has been said to exhibit "cross-continental migration" in addition to migration at sea.

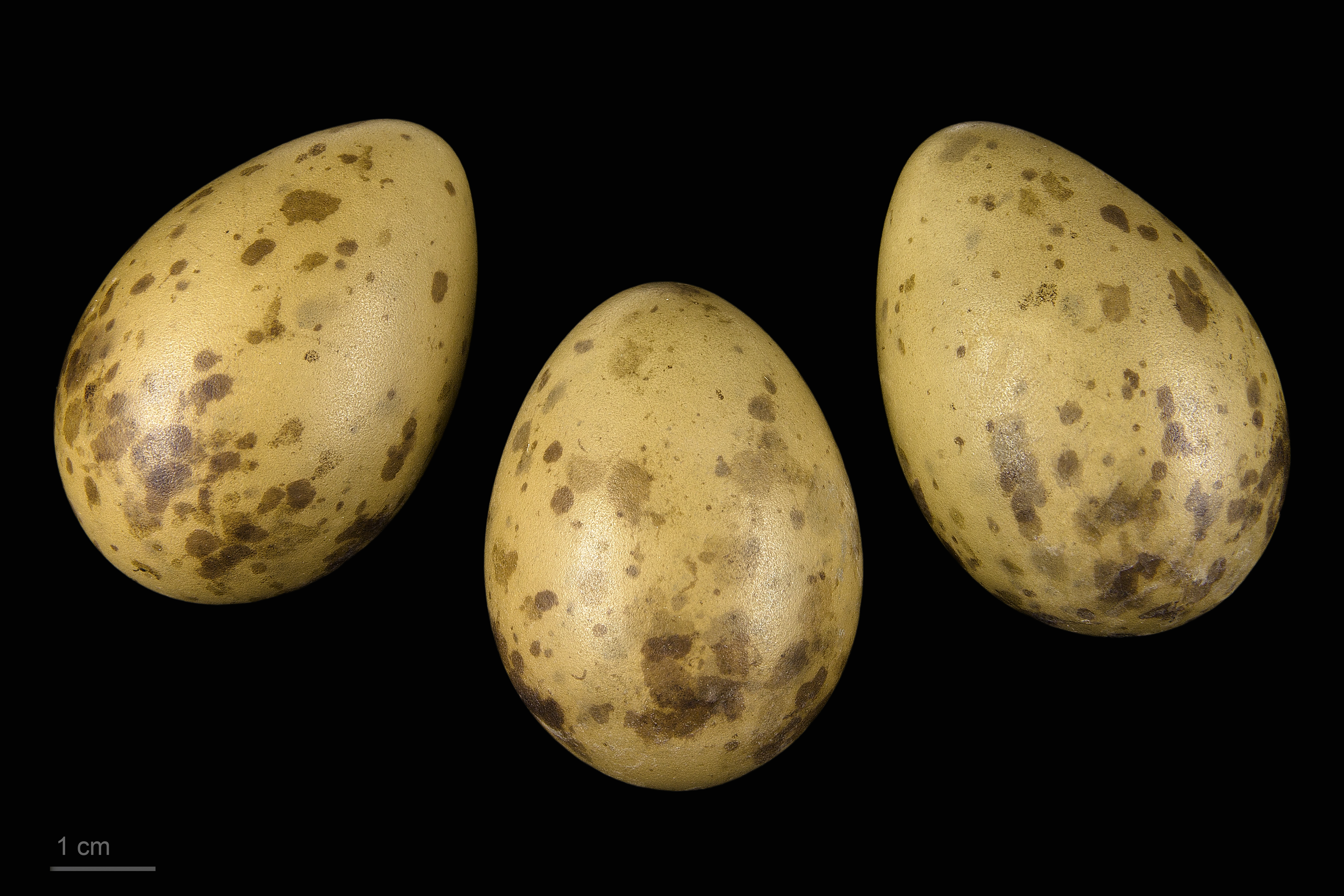
Sabine's gull eggs

== Diet and feeding ==
The diet and feeding preferences of Sabine's gull varies by season and habitat. In the breeding season, the gulls pursue a range of freshwater and terrestrial prey on the tundra (and within boreal river deltas, estuaries and coastal wetlands), including both terrestrial and aquatic beetles, springtails, craneflies, mosquitoes, midges, flower flies (Syrphidae), molluscs, insects, arachnids, water bugs, various invertebrate larvae, crustaceans, fish, as well as nestling birds or unhatched eggs. Young chicks and eggs, while generally consumed opportunistically, may include waterfowl, black turnstones and Lapland longspurs, as well as other gulls, including Sabine's gulls.
