= Sabine Rantzsch =

East German swimmer (born 1953)

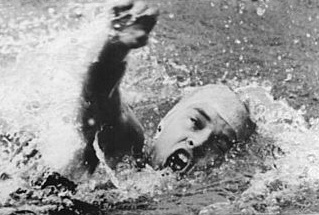
- Sabine Rantzsch in 1968

Personal information
- Born: 8 May 1953 (age 73) Leipzig, Germany
- Height: 1.65 m (5 ft 5 in)
- Weight: 55 kg (121 lb)

Sport
- Sport: Swimming
- Club: SC DHfK, Leipzig

Sabine Rantzsch (born 8 May 1953) is a retired East German swimmer. She competed at the 1968 Summer Olympics in the 800 m freestyle event, but failed to reach the final.
