= Tewin =

Village in Hertfordshire, England

Coordinates: 51.817°N 0.156°W

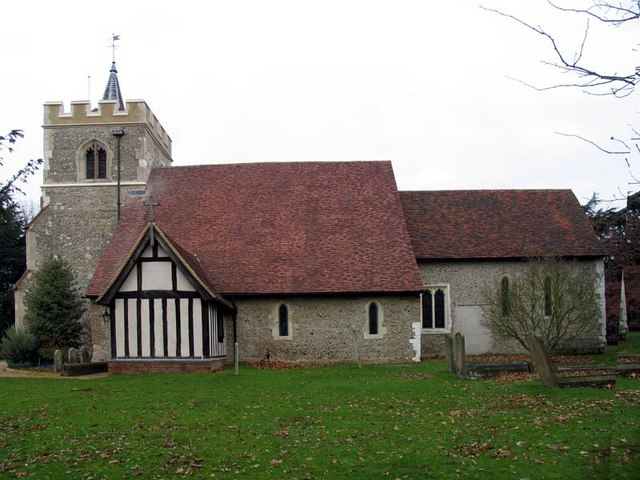
- St Peter's Church, Tewin

- Location within Hertfordshire
- Population: 1,596 (Parish, 2021)
- OS grid reference: TL272147
- Civil parish: Tewin
- District: East Hertfordshire
- Shire county: Hertfordshire
- Region: East
- Country: England
- Sovereign state: United Kingdom
- Post town: WELWYN
- Postcode district: AL6
- Dialling code: 01438
- UK Parliament: North East Hertfordshire

Tewin is a village and civil parish in the East Hertfordshire district of Hertfordshire, England. It lies 3 miles (4.8 km) east of the village of Welwyn, which serves as its post town, 2 miles (3 km) north-east of Welwyn Garden City and 4 miles (6 km) north-west of Hertford. At the 2021 census, the parish had a population of 1,596.

Tewin Wood is a very affluent residential area in Tewin and ranked amongst the most expensive areas in the UK with average property prices in many streets well in excess of £2 million.

== History ==
The village dates back, at least, to Anglo-Saxon times and its name has its origins in the English as spoken in that era.

Tewin is known to have been settled by the Angles in 449 AD; the name being a derivative of the Old English words for the Norse god Týr (“Tiw”) and meadow (“Ing”). However the name varies over the centuries – in the Domesday Book it is Tewinge and Theinge – and in the 16th century Tewinge, Tewing and Twying, but it is thought the village became Tewin in the 18th century. An alternative derivation from Brittonic is possible, connected with the modern Welsh Tywyn or Dune.

In December 1782 the highway robber Walter Clibbon (a local pie-maker) was fatally wounded by the roadside near Queen Hoo Hall. Clibbon, together with his two sons, was believed responsible for numerous robberies and at least one murder in the neighbourhood of Ware. One of his sons, Joseph, was convicted at Hertford Assizes and executed the following March, although the other escaped. Clibbon's Post can be observed from the road in Brickground Wood, just east of Tewin, and this is the spot where Walter Clibbon was interred.

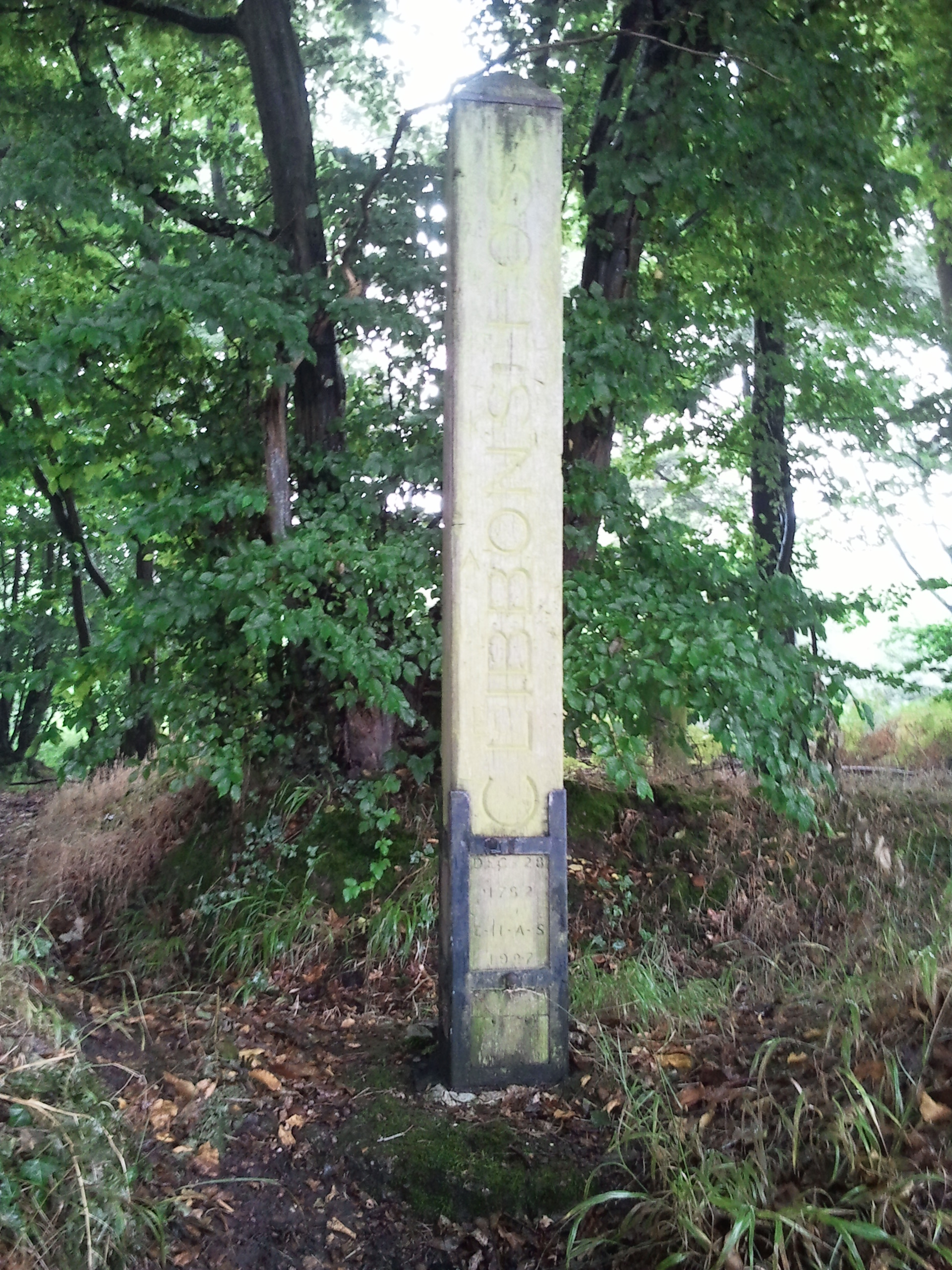
Clibbon's Post marks the spot where Walter Clibbon was fatally shot

The Diaries of John Carrington a farmer and minor public official document life in Tewin from 1798–1810.

== Amenities ==
The main village of Tewin is situated around the Lower Green, which is surrounded by the Memorial Hall, the Rose and Crown pub, Tewin Cowper Junior School, and a village shop and post office. Half a mile to the north is Upper Green, which hosts various sporting activities such as tennis, cricket and football, as well as the Plume of Feathers pub.

Saint Peter's is the local church, situated half a mile to the south west of Lower Green.

There are active sports clubs, and social events are organised by various groups around the village including the long running Tewin Players. Tewin Cricket Club (TCC) is a popular and thriving club, with a newly refurbished pavilion, at Upper Green. It has over 40 playing members and 18 lifetime members. There is an annual tour in the summer months which in recent years has been to Sidmouth.

The Memorial Hall in the heart of the village provides accommodation for many activities, and funds raised by a supporters' club, as well as money from other sources, has enabled a programme of repair and redecoration to take place.

Tewin does not have a railway station of its own, however Tewin is within a two mile distance of Welwyn North railway station, where train services are currently provided by Thameslink and Great Northern.

== Countryside ==
Tewin is set in a rural landscape which retains many features characteristic of ancient countryside and which supports a wide variety of wildlife. The village contains areas set aside for the Hertfordshire and Middlesex Wildlife Trust which are managed by volunteers, these include Tewin Orchard and Hopkyns Wood Nature reserve.

== Notable people ==
- Joseph Sabine FRS (1770–1837), lawyer, naturalist and writer on horticulture
