= Elizabeth Juliana Leeves Sabine =

British translator

Elizabeth Juliana Leeves (1807 – 1879) was an English scientist who assisted her husband Sir Edward Sabine in his scientific work and translated important scientific works from German into English.

== Life and work ==
Born at Seaford in Sussex and baptised there on 26 October 1807, at Chichester in Sussex on 14 December 1826, when she was 19 years old, she married Edward Sabine.

Leeves' translation from German into English of Alexander von Humboldt's Kosmos, the first four volumes, was published first in Britain in 1849 and republished subsequently. She also translated Humboldt's two volume Aspects of Nature, in Different Lands and Different Climates; with Scientific Elucidations, published in 1849. Her translation of François Arago's Meteorological Essays and Narrative of an Expedition to the Polar Sea, was first published 1840 under the superintendence of her husband. Leeves also translated the writings of Carl Friedrich Gauss on terrestrial magnetism.

In translating Humboldt's Kosmos Leeves received help from the Prussian envoy in London and evangelical theologian Christian Charles Josias von Bunsen. As translator of Humboldt into English Leeves made several changes to the text. In her Kosmos translation she left out passages that were considered incongruent with traditional beliefs, and thus made Kosmos consistent with British natural theology. Her husband added footnote commentary to her translation with the assistance of London-based Scottish geologist Roderick Impey Murchison and other scientists that were part of his wider circle of friends. When it was published Leeves' translation of Kosmos was regarded as the most authoritative English Cosmos. Based on her translation Humboldt's work was reviewed in several leading British periodicals. The translation was regarded as "singularly accurate and elegant", but its British edition was criticised as expensive and for leaving out passages that did not conform to "national prejudices". Among others the geographic location of what Humboldt termed the cradle of mankind was left out. Humboldt wrote to Bunsen calling Britain "that strange island" in reference to British religious traditionalism. In the long run Leeves' English translation was superseded by the translation of Elise Otté in 1858, who benefitted not only from Leeves' translation but also the French translation by Hervé Faye. Otté's English translation of Kosmos was cheaper, did not omit any "obnoxious" passages and all foreign measures were converted into English terms.

Leeves and Sabine had no children. She died in 1879.

== Published translations ==
- Aspects of Nature, in Different Lands and Different Climates; with Scientific Elucidations
