= Sabine von Heusinger =

German medievalist (born 1964)

- Born: 13 September 1964 (age 61); Rielasingen, Germany
- Education: University of Konstanz; Università degli Studi dell 'Aquila; University of Mannheim
- Occupation: Professor if medieval history
- Spouse: Klaus von Heusinger

Sabine von Heusinger (born 13 September 1964) is a German professor of medieval history at the University of Cologne.

== Early life ==
Sabine von Heusinger was born 13 September 1964 in Rielasingen. She studied German, politics and history at the University of Konstanz and Università degli Studi dell 'Aquila. In 1991, her Magister followed. She earned her doctorate at the University of Konstanz with a thesis on "Der observante Dominikaner Johannes Mulberg und der Basler Beginenstreit". Her Habilitation took place in 2006 at the University of Mannheim with work on social groups in the city using example from the guilds in Strasbourg.

On the basis of 4,055 individual entries on Strasbourg guild members from the second half of the 13th century to the end of the 15th century, she analyzed the Strasbourg guild system. Heusinger sees the Strasbourg guilds as mobile social groups and distinguishes four "sub-areas" of the medieval guild: the commercial guild, the brotherhood, the political guild and finally the military unit. She was able to prove in "more than 30% of the cases examined for Strasbourg [...] a guild change between the two generations."

Von Heusinger taught at the Universities of Konstanz, Luzern and Stuttgart. Since 2000 she has been working at the University of Mannheim. In Mannheim, she was a research associate since October 2007 and an Academic Counselor since February 2008. In 2008/2009, she was a visiting professor of Medieval history at Bielefeld University. In 2010, she was a senior fellow at the University of Konstanz. From 2011, she has taught as the successor to Eberhard Isenmann as professor of medieval history at the University of Cologne with an emphasis on the late Middle Ages.

Her main fields of expertise are the history of the church, the history of religions and confessions, the history of everyday life, the family, life forms, women and gender, regional, urban and local history as well as social, political and cultural orders.

She is married to the linguist Klaus von Heusinger.

== Selected publications ==
- Die Zunft im Mittelalter. Zur Verflechtung von Politik, Wirtschaft und Gesellschaft in Straßburg (= Vierteljahrschrift für Sozial- und Wirtschaftsgeschichte. Bd. 206). Steiner, Stuttgart 2009, ISBN 978-3-515-09392-7(= Zugleich: Mannheim, Universität, Habilitations-Schrift, 2006) (Rezension)
- Johannes Mulberg OP († 1414). Ein Leben im Spannungsfeld von Dominikanerobservanz und Beginenstreit (= Quellen und Forschungen zur Geschichte des Dominikanerordens. Bd. 9). Akademie-Verlag, Berlin 2000, ISBN 3-05-003543-9 (Zugleich: Konstanz, Universität, Dissertation, 1996).
