= Joseph Sabine =

British botanist and zoologist (1770–1837)

Joseph Sabine FRS
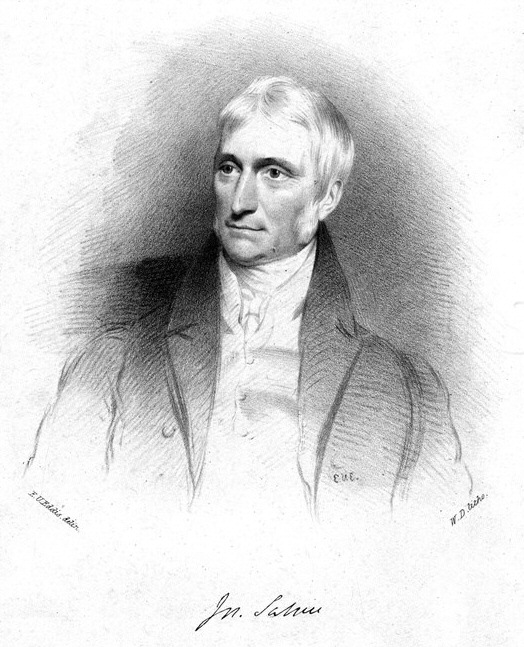
- Born: 6 June 1770; Tewin, Hertfordshire, England
- Died: 24 January 1837 (aged 66); Hanover Square, London, England
- Relatives: Edward Sabine (brother)
- Scientific career
- Fields: Natural history
- Workplaces: Linnean Society; Royal Horticultural Society
- Author abbrev. (botany): Sabine

Joseph Sabine FRS (/ˈseɪbɪn/ SAY-bin; 6 June 1770 – 24 January 1837) was an English lawyer, naturalist and writer on horticulture.

== Life and work ==
Sabine was born into a prominent Anglo-Irish family in Tewin, Hertfordshire, the eldest son of Joseph Sabine. His younger brother was Sir Edward Sabine.

Sabine practised law until 1808, when he was appointed Inspector General of Taxes, a position he held until 1835. He had a lifelong interest in natural history and was an original fellow of the Linnean Society, elected on 7 November 1779. Sabine was honorary secretary of the Royal Horticultural Society from 1810 to 1830 and treasurer, receiving their gold medal for organising the accounts left in a state of disarray by Richard Anthony Salisbury. The society's gardens at Hammersmith, then Chiswick, were established under his guidance. He sent David Douglas and others to collect specimens, initiating local societies as extensions of the society. He contributed around forty papers for their Transactions, on garden flowers and vegetables. His management of the accounts led to large debts and after a threat of censure by a committee he resigned in 1830.

Sabine then focused on the position of secretary and vice-chairman of the Zoological Society of London, significantly increasing their collection of animals. He was a recognised authority on the moulting, migration and habit of British birds. He was elected a Fellow of the Royal Society in November 1799.

Edward Sabine was a member of John Ross's Arctic voyage in 1818. He sent Joseph a specimen of a new gull which had been discovered during the expedition, which Joseph named Sabine's gull (Larus sabini) in honour of his brother.

Sabine died in Mill Street, Hanover Square, London, on 24 Jan. 1837 and was buried in Kensal Green Cemetery on 1 February. There is a lithograph of him after a portrait by Eddis and his name was commemorated by de Candolle for a leguminous genus Sabinea.

== List of selected publications ==
- Sabine, Joseph (1830). "An Account and Description of the Species and most remarkable Varieties of Spring Crocuses, cultivated in the Garden of the Horticultural Society. January 6, 1829". Transactions of the Horticultural Society of London. 7: 419–432.
