= Tony James (chemist) =

English chemist (born 1964)

Tony D. James
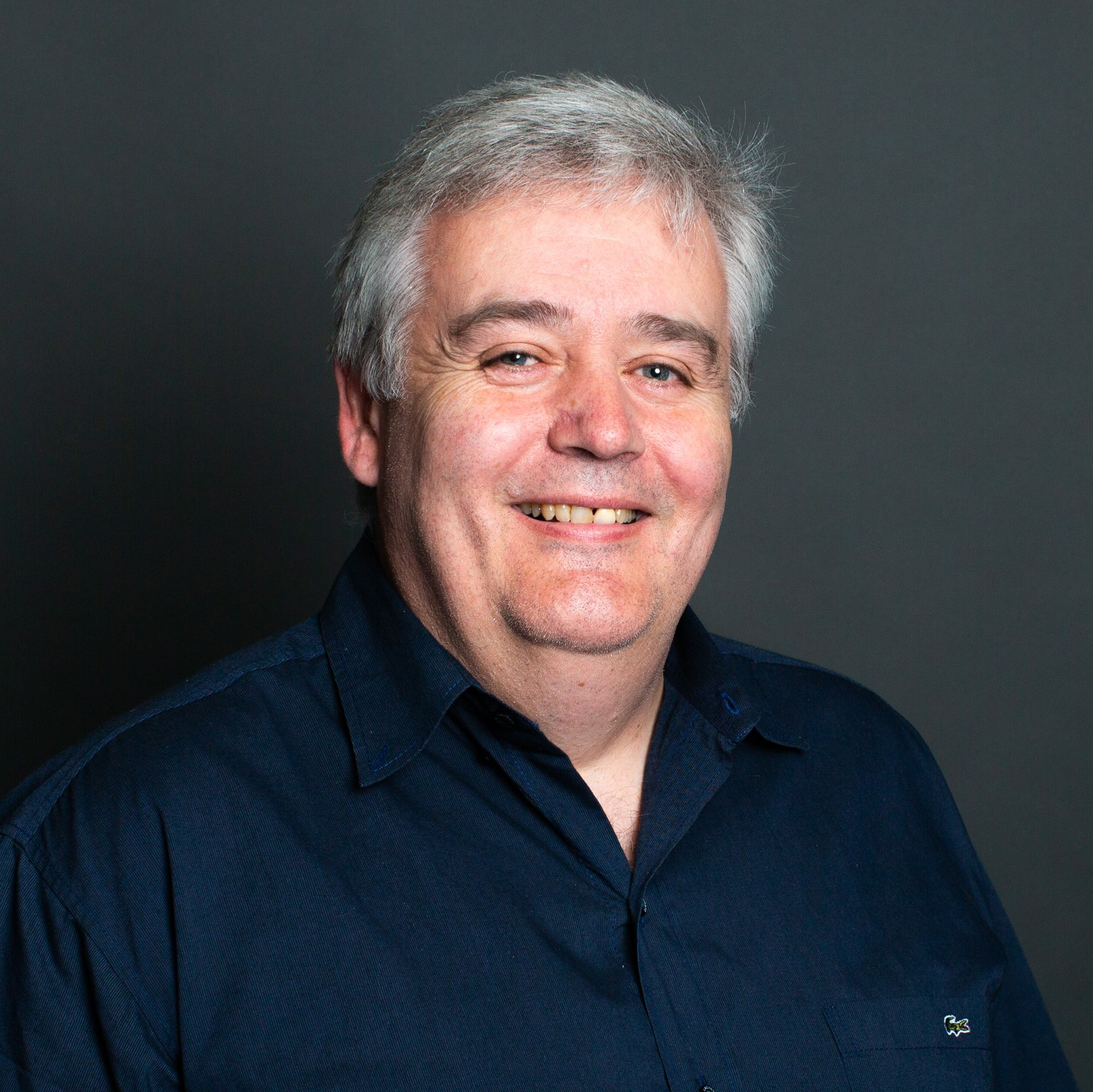
- Born: 7 October 1964 (age 61); Broseley, Shropshire, UK
- Education: University of East Anglia; University of Victoria
- Spouse: Eriko Furukawa
- Children: Two
- Awards: Daiwa Adrian Prize (2013)
- Scientific career
- Fields: Chemistry
- Workplaces: University of Bath
- Website: chemosensors.com

Tony D. James FRSC (born 7 October 1964) is a chemist who is currently Professor of Chemistry at the University of Bath and recipient of the Royal Society Wolfson Research Merit Award.

He was educated at the University of East Anglia (BSc, 1986) and the University of Victoria (PhD, 1991). He was made a Fellow of the Royal Society of Chemistry in 2012 and received the Daiwa Adrian Prize in 2013.
