= Suzanne Scarlata =

Biophysicist

- Education: University of Illinois at Urbana-Champaign
- Scientific career
- Thesis: Local motions in proteins as investigated by the thermal coeffecient of the frictional resistance to rotation (1984)

Suzanne Frances Scarlata is the Richard Whitcomb Professor at Worcester Polytechnic Institute. She is known for her work on how cells respond to hormones and neurotransmitters. She is an elected fellow of the American Association for the Advancement of Science.

== Education and career ==
Scarlata was born in 1958 and grew up in Philadelphia. She received a B.A. from Temple University in 1979, and she went on to earn her Ph.D. from the University of Illinois, Urbana-Champaign. After her Ph.D. she accepted a position at AT&T Bell Laboratories where she worked on methods for testing circuit boards. She then moved to New York City where she worked at Cornell University Medical College. In 1991 she moved to Stony Brook University where she remained for 24 years. In 2016 she moved to Worcester Polytechnic Institute where, as of 2022, she is the Richard Whitcomb Professor of Chemistry and Biochemistry. In 2016, Scarlata was elected president of the Biophysical Society and is presently the Editor-In-Chief of the Science of Nature.

== Research ==
In her own words, Scarlata is "fascinated by the way that cells grow, move, or die depending on their environment". Her early research examined the motion of fluorophores. She went on to examine histones under high pressure, the compression of lipid membranes, and the binding affinities of compounds within lipids. Scarlata is also interested in the use of enzymes to alter materials used in building construction. In 2021, Scarlata was involved in a research project that used the enzyme carbonic anhydrase to fix cracks in concrete.

== Selected publications ==
- Rebecchi, M. J.; Scarlata, S. (1 June 1998). "PLECKSTRIN HOMOLOGY DOMAINS: A Common Fold with Diverse Functions". Annual Review of Biophysics and Biomolecular Structure. 27 (1): 503–528. doi:10.1146/annurev.biophys.27.1.503. ISSN 1056-8700. PMID 9646876.
- Garcia, Pilar; Gupta, Rakesh; Shah, Shefali; Morris, Andrew J.; Rudge, Simon A.; Scarlata, Suzanne; Petrova, Victoria; McLaughlin, Stuart; Rebecchi, Mario J. (December 1995). "The pleckstrin homology domain of phospholipase C-.delta.1 binds with high affinity to phosphatidylinositol 4,5-bisphosphate in bilayer membranes". Biochemistry. 34 (49): 16228–16234. doi:10.1021/bi00049a039. PMID 8519781.
- Scarlata, Suzanne; Carter, Carol (11 July 2003). "Role of HIV-1 Gag domains in viral assembly". Biochimica et Biophysica Acta (BBA) - Biomembranes. 1614 (1): 62–72. doi:10.1016/S0005-2736(03)00163-9. ISSN 0005-2736. PMID 12873766.
- Runnels, L.W.; Scarlata, S.F. (October 1995). "Theory and application of fluorescence homotransfer to melittin oligomerization". Biophysical Journal. 69 (4): 1569–1583. Bibcode:1995BpJ....69.1569R. doi:10.1016/s0006-3495(95)80030-5. ISSN 0006-3495. PMC 1236388. PMID 8534828.

== Awards and honors ==
In 2020 Scarlata was elected a fellow of the American Association for the Advancement of Science.
