= Elizabeth Sabine =

British voice coach

- Born: October 1923; London, England
- Died: December 7, 2015; Los Angeles, California, U.S.

Elizabeth Sabine (October 1923 – 7 December 2015) was a voice-strengthening specialist best known for her work with heavy metal rocker bands that began in 1975 and continued through the 1990s. She received the Lifetime Achievement Award at the Los Angeles Music Awards in 2003 for her contributions to the field.

== Biography ==
Sabine, who grew up in Australia, initially pursued a career in entertainment, gaining recognition as a vocalist on the live variety TV show In Melbourne Tonight.

In 1974, she moved to Los Angeles where she befriended Robert Mazzarella, a local singing teacher and operatic tenor. Toward the end of the 1970s, Sabine discovered her ability to refine vocal techniques for hard rock and heavy metal music vocalists, whose voices often scream and yell. Her approach was designed to facilitate faster mastery of vocal skills compared to other available methods. Notable artists such as Axl Rose, singer of Guns N' Roses, and frontman Dave Mustaine, the founding member of Megadeth, received instruction from Sabine, earning her the moniker ‘Heavy Metal Grandma’. She also trained band members from Malice and Sugartooth. She helped individuals with speaking such as Priscilla Presley and Chuck Norris.

In 1981, Lee Strasberg of the Lee Strasberg Theatre Institute of Los Angeles enlisted Sabine to strengthen the voices of his acting and singing students, a role she fulfilled for several years.

In 2008, Christian Rock band Barren Cross returned to the music world with new vocalist Dean Kohn who spent two years under Sabine. Additionally, singers and songwriters Krickett & Pepper were among her students. Other students included concert promoter, once-singer Gabe Reed, and Cypress Hill’s B-Real.
