= Journal of Fluorescence =

Scientific journal

- Discipline: Fluorescence
- Language: English
- Edited by: Chris D. Geddes

Publication details
- History: 1991—present
- Publisher: Springer
- Frequency: Bimonthly
- Impact factor: 3.1 (2024)

Standard abbreviations
- ISO 4: J. Fluoresc.

Indexing
- CODEN: JOFLEN
- ISSN: 1053-0509 (print); 1573-4994 (web)

Links
- Journal homepage; Online access; Online archive

Journal of Fluorescence is a peer-reviewed scientific journal published bimonthly by Springer Science+Business Media. It covers research on applications of fluorescence techniques, including fluorescence microscopy and fluorescence spectroscopy. It was established in 1991 and its current editor-in-chief is Chris D. Geddes (University of Maryland, Baltimore County).

== Abstracting and indexing ==
The journal is abstracted and indexed in:

- Current Contents/Physical, Chemical & Earth Sciences
- EBSCO databases
- Ei Compendex
- MEDLINE
- ProQuest databases
- Scopus
- Science Citation Index Expanded

According to the Journal Citation Reports, the journal has a 2024 impact factor of 3.1.
