= IAEDANS =

Names
- Preferred IUPAC name 5-{[2-(2-Iodoacetamido)ethyl]amino}naphthalene-1-sulfonic acid
- Other names 5-[2-[(2-Iodo-1-oxoethyl)amino]ethylamino]-1-naphthalenesulfonic acid 1,5-IAEDANS

Identifiers
CAS Number	36930-63-9
3D model (JSmol)	Interactive image
ChEBI	CHEBI:58984
ChemSpider	82727
ECHA InfoCard	100.048.418
PubChem CID	91621
UNII	6V7G304M5M
CompTox Dashboard (EPA)	DTXSID10190421
- InChI: InChI=1S/C14H15IN2O4S/c15-9-14(18)17-8-7-16-12-5-1-4-11-10(12)3-2-6-13(11)22(19,20)21/h1-6,16H,7-9H2,(H,17,18)(H,19,20,21) Key: ZMERMCRYYFRELX-UHFFFAOYSA-N; InChI=1/C14H15IN2O4S/c15-9-14(18)17-8-7-16-12-5-1-4-11-10(12)3-2-6-13(11)22(19,20)21/h1-6,16H,7-9H2,(H,17,18)(H,19,20,21) Key: ZMERMCRYYFRELX-UHFFFAOYAI
- SMILES: O=S(=O)(O)c1cccc2c1cccc2NCCNC(=O)CI

Properties
Chemical formula	C_{14}H_{15}IN_{2}O_{4}S
Molar mass	434.25 g·mol^{−1}
- Except where otherwise noted, data are given for materials in their standard state (at 25 °C [77 °F], 100 kPa). verify (what is ?) Infobox references

IAEDANS is an organic fluorophore (fluorescent molecule). It stands for 5-({2-[(iodoacetyl)amino]ethyl}amino)naphthalene-1-sulfonic acid. It is widely used as a marker in fluorescence spectroscopy.

1,5-IAEDANS has a peak excitation wavelength of 336 nm and a peak emission wavelength of 490 nm. The extinction coefficient of the dye is 5700. It is soluble in dimethylformamide (DMF) or buffer above pH 6 and reacts primarily with thiols.

The absorption spectrum IAEDANS overlaps well with the emission spectrum of tryptophan, making it useful as an acceptor in FRET experiments. It can also be used as a resonance energy donor to fluorophores such as fluorescein, Alexa Fluor 488, Oregon Green, and BODIPY FL.
