= Prajadhipok Road =

Street in Bangkok, Thailand

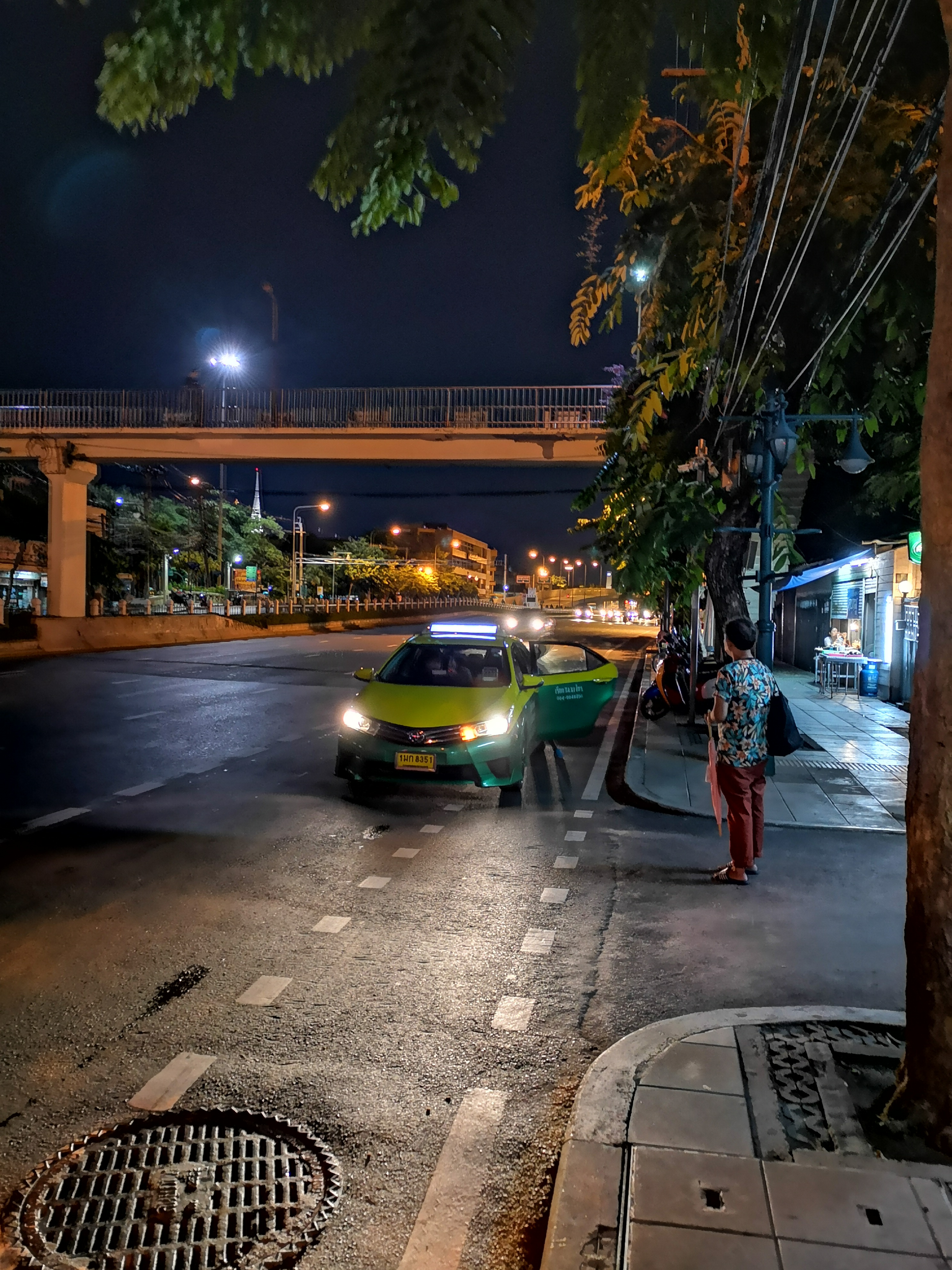
- Prajadhipok Road at night near Wongwian Lek
- Interactive map of Prajadhipok Road
- Native name: ถนนประชาธิปก
- Namesake: King Prajadhipok (Rama VII)
- Length: 1.248 km (0.775 mi)
- Location: Thonburi, Bangkok, Thailand
- Coordinates: 13°43′47″N 100°29′40″E
- Southwest end: Wongwian Yai
- Northesat end: Phaya Mai Road; Memorial Bridge; Phra Pok Klao Bridge

Prajadhipok Road (Thai: ถนนประชาธิปก, RTGS: Thanon Prachathipok, pronounced [tʰā.nǒn prā.t͡ɕʰāː.tʰí.pòk]) is a road in Thon Buri District, Bangkok. It begins at Wongwian Yai and runs northeast, passing Ban Khaek Intersection, where it meets Itsaraphap Road. It then passes through the Wongwian Lek area; after crossing Khlong Somdet Chao Phraya, it intersects Arun Amarin Road, with Suksanari School located alongside. On the opposite side are the clock tower and the roundabout of Wongwian Lek, where it also meets Somdet Chao Phraya Road.

The road then splits into three routes. One branch veers slightly left, passes beneath the approach to the Memorial Bridge, curves toward Wat Prayurawongsawat, and loops under the bridge to connect with Phaya Mai Road, an area known for another Buddha amulet market in Bangkok apart from Tha Phrachan, on the Wongwian Lek side. The second branch continues straight across the Memorial Bridge toward the Pak Khlong Talat area, while the third branch leads onto Phra Pok Klao Bridge, which runs parallel to the Memorial Bridge; at the far end, it splits again into two directions, one descending into the Phahurat area and the other veering right toward the Chakkrawat area in Samphanthawong District. Both Pak Khlong Talat and Phahurat are located in Wang Burapha Phirom Subdistrict, Phra Nakhon District.

The road also serves as a boundary line. From its starting point at Wongwian Yai to Ban Khaek Intersection, the side leading toward the Memorial Bridge is within Hiran Ruchi Subdistrict, and beyond that point it becomes Wat Kanlaya Subdistrict. Both subdistricts belong to Thon Buri District, while the opposite side is entirely within Somdet Chao Phraya Subdistrict of Khlong San District.

It was constructed in 1929 as the first road in a project to build 11 roads on the Thonburi side (the west bank of the Chao Phraya River), intended to support the future growth of land transportation. In 1932, marking the 150th anniversary of Rattanakosin (Bangkok), the government under King Prajadhipok (Rama VII) launched a megaproject to construct the Memorial Bridge, connecting Phra Nakhon (the main core of Bangkok) with Thonburi. After its completion, the road was named "Prajadhipok" in honor of the king.

Since March 2024, Prajadhipok Road between Ban Khaek Intersection and the area in front of Suksanari School has experienced traffic congestion due to the construction of Saphan Phut Station (PP24), an underground station on the MRT Purple Line extension (Tao Poon–Rat Burana, Kanchanaphisek Ring Road). As a result, traffic flow in the area has had to be reconfigured.

On the evening of July 9, 2026, a section of Prajadhipok Road near Wongwian Yai subsided after water leaked into the construction tunnel of the Purple Line MRT, which is currently under construction. Bangkok Governor Chadchart Sittipunt ordered the closure of three buildings located within a 30 m (98.4 ft) radius of the incident site and the evacuation of approximately 60 residents from the area for one week. Prajadhipok Road was also closed to traffic between Ban Khaek Intersection and Wongwian Yai, a stretch of more than 200 m (656.2 ft), in order to minimize vibrations and reduce the risk to nearby buildings.
