= Wongwian Yai =

Roundabout in Bangkok, Thailand

Coordinates: 13°43′34.709″N 100°29′35.127″E

King Taksin Monument
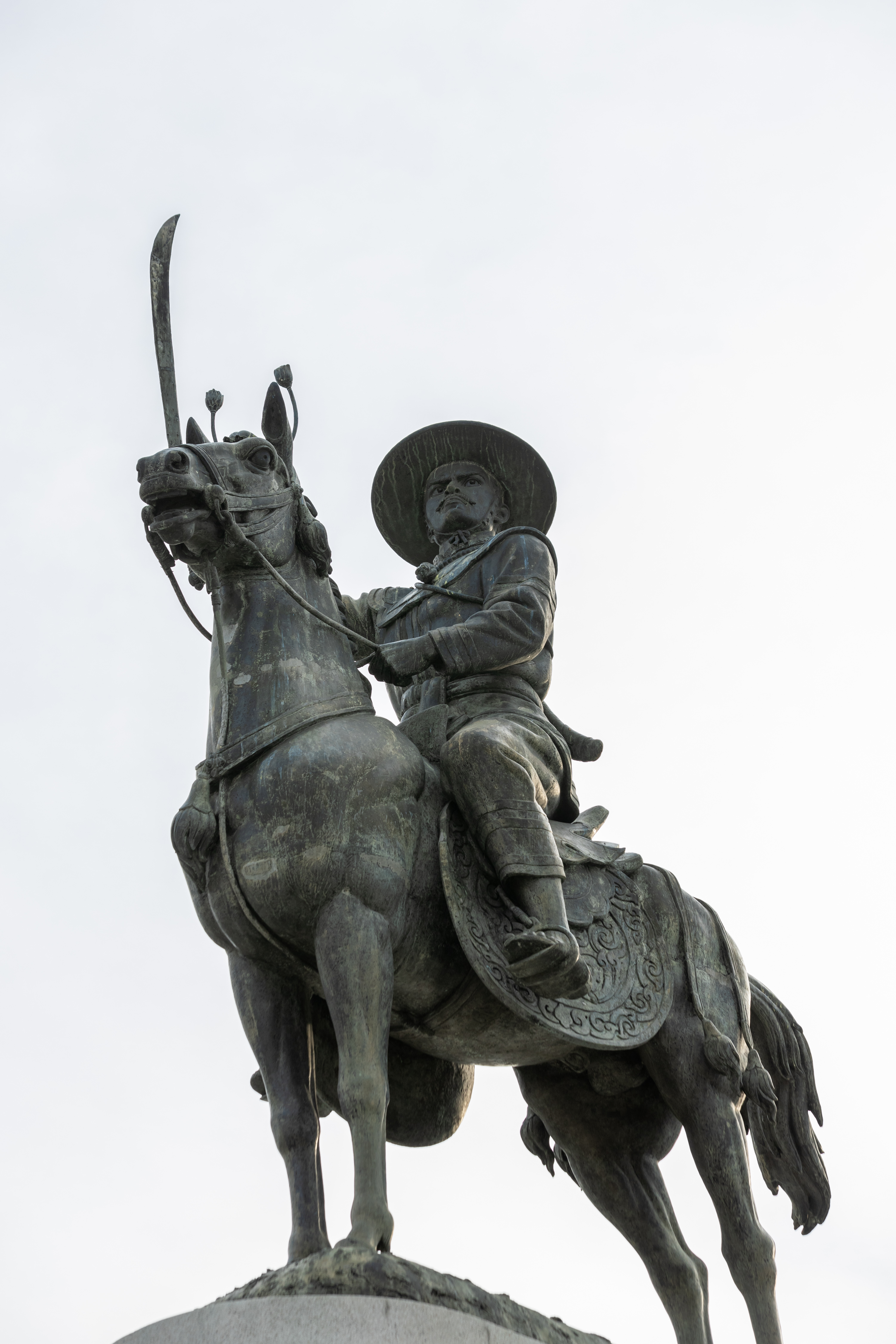
- Statue of King Taksin at Wongwian Yai
- Interactive map of King Taksin Monument
- Designer: Silpa Bhirasri
- Type: Monument
- Beginning date: 1953
- Completion date: 17 April 1954
- Opening date: 28 December 1954
- Dedicated to: King Taksin the Great

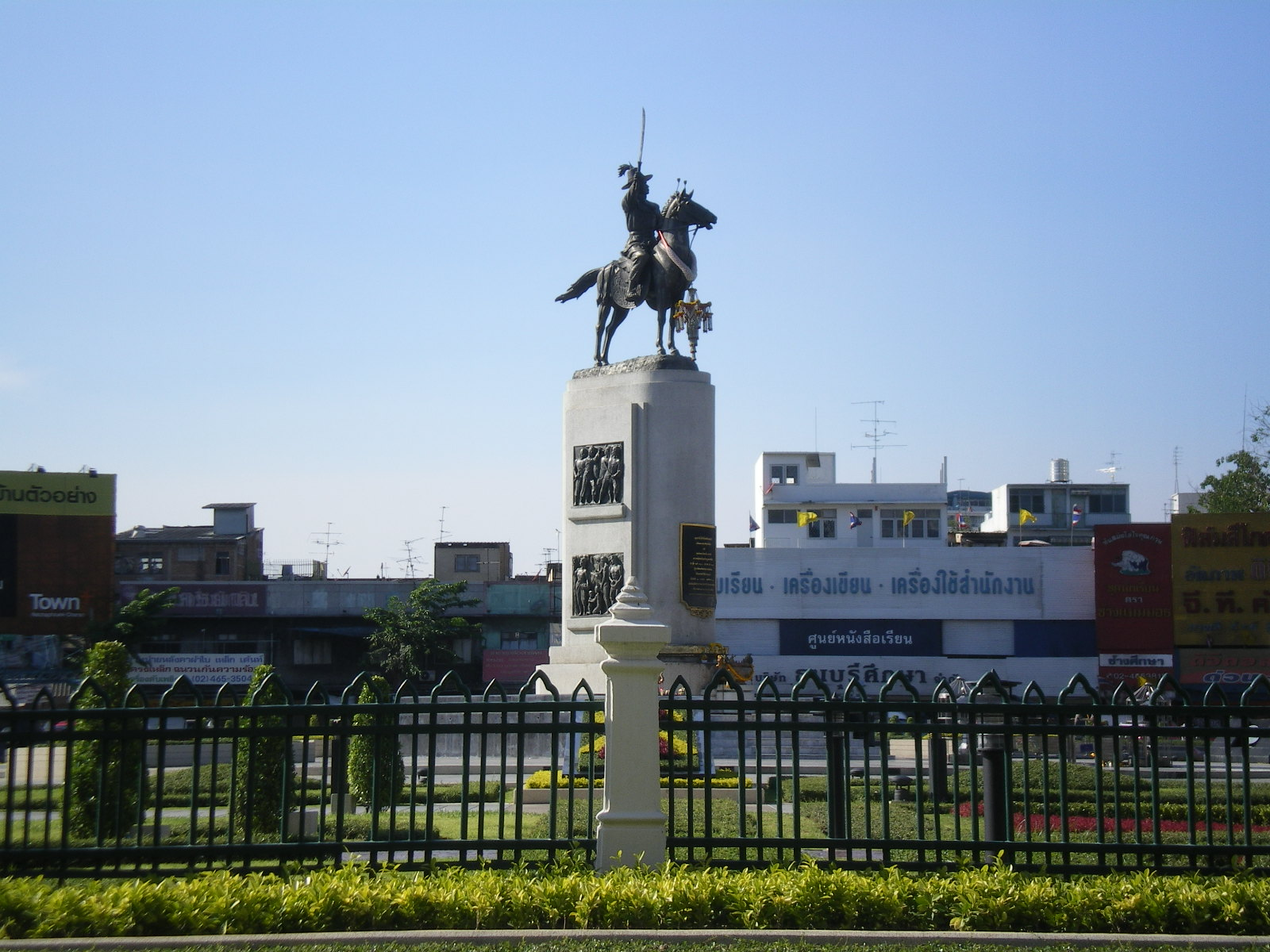
Statue of King Taksin at Wongwian Yai

Wongwian Yai, also spelled "Wong Wian Yai" or "Wongwien Yai" (Thai: วงเวียนใหญ่, pronounced [wōŋ.wīa̯n jàj]; lit. 'big roundabout'), is a large roundabout (traffic circle) in Thonburi, on the west bank of the Chao Phraya River in Bangkok, Thailand, where the statue of King Taksin is situated. It overlaps between the four sub-districts of two districts, Bang Yi Ruea and Hiran Ruchi of Thon Buri with Somdet Chao Phraya and Khlong San of Khlong San in the centre of Bangkok, at the intersection of Prajadhipok/ Intharaphithak/ Lat Ya/ Somdet Phra Chao Taksin Roads.

Wongwian Yai station, a cluster of railway and rapid transit stations, is located nearby. It includes the existing terminus of the State Railway of Thailand's Maeklong Railway and an elevated station on the BTS Skytrain's Silom Line, as well as an under-construction underground station of the MRT Purple Line, and a planned station of the SRT Dark Red Line, which will replace the old railway station.

== History ==
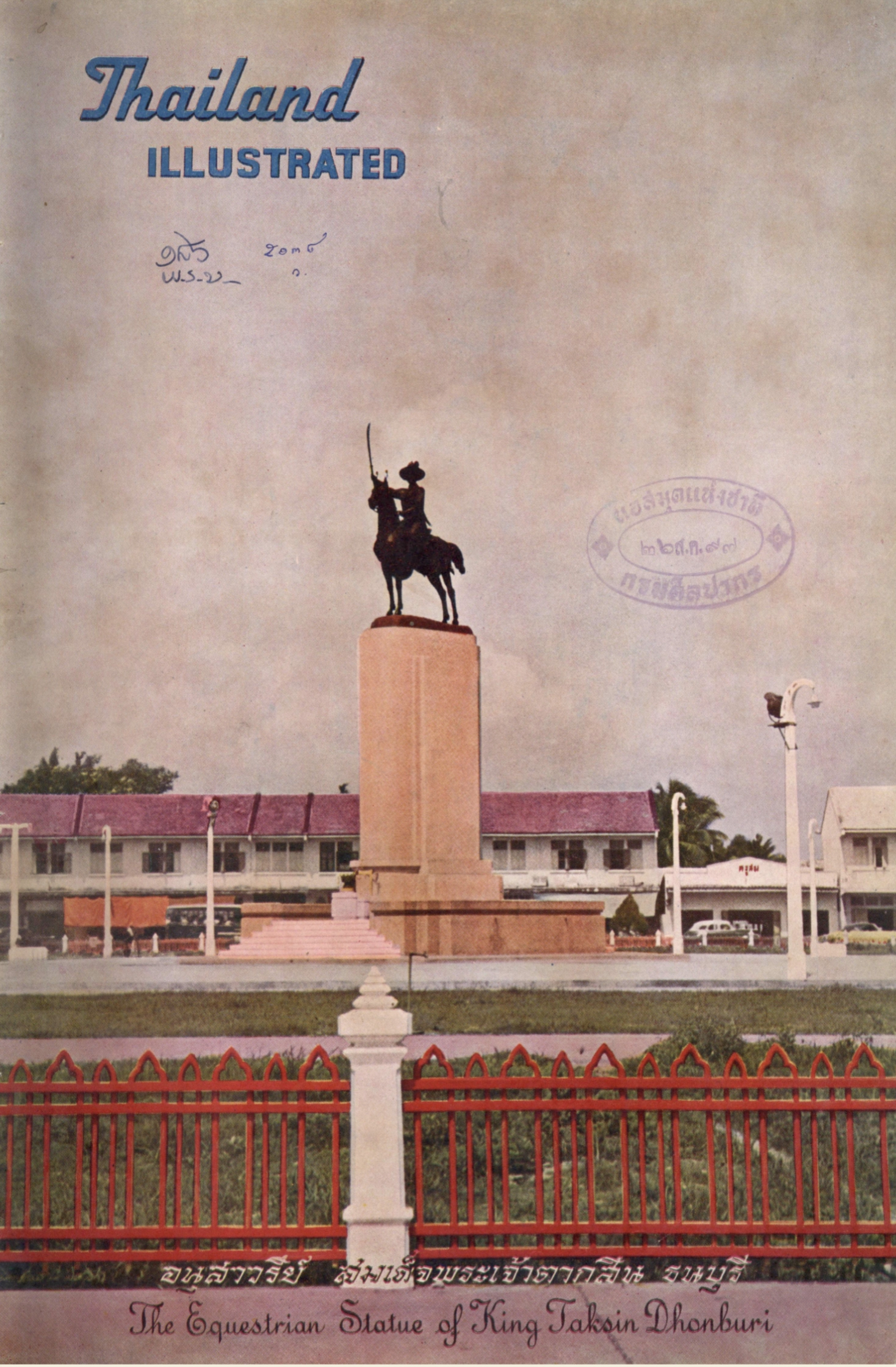
Wongwian Yai appearing on an issue of Thailand Illustrated in 1954

The circle was built following the Memorial Bridge (Phra Phutta Yodfa Bridge) opening on 6 April 1932, commemorating the 150th anniversary of the Chakri Dynasty and Bangkok City (Rattanakosin Kingdom). The bridge from old Bangkok conducted 11 new road projects to be built on Thonburi side of the Chao Phraya River, also with the circle. It was named Wongwian Yai, "big circle" in Thai, as there was a smaller traffic circle with a clock tower next to the Memorial Bridge called Wongwian Lek, "small circle". The statue of King Taksin was built 21 years later.

== Statue of King Taksin ==
As a memorial to Taksin the Great, one of the great Thai kings who liberated the country after Ayutthaya was taken by the Burmese in 1767, a statue was built here in 1953, on the Thonburi side of the river where the king had established a new capital in 1768. The statue was created by the Italian sculptor Corrado Feroci, who worked under the Thai name Silpa Bhirasi. A state ceremony on a day of homage to the king, 28 December, has been held annually since 1954. The statue was constructed following a proposal submitted to the government by Thongyu Phutthaphat, MP for Thonburi. It was funded through public donations, and its design was selected through a public vote from a total of seven proposed designs.

== Wongwian Yai area ==
The circle is one of Bangkok's major traffic intersections, linking residential areas on the Thonburi side to Bangkok's downtown via the Memorial Bridge in the north. The northeastern road, Lat Ya, links Khlong San Pier with ferry service to Si Phraya Road or the further Taksin Bridge to Sathon and Si Lom business clusters. The southern road, Somdet Phrachao Taksin (or Taksin Road), links to suburban areas on Suk Sawat and Rama II Road and reaches Chulachomklao Fort at the river's mouth in Samut Prakan Province. The western road, Inthara Phitak, is important as it links to the beginning of Phet Kasem Road, the highway to west and south Thailand. At the southwest corner of the circle, there is a commuter railway station to Samut Sakhon Province.

Because of its traffic, the area used to be the major business area of Thonburi, before urbanization reached outer areas of Bangkok. There are many markets, retail shops, department stores, cinemas, and other businesses. The area is also known for its large cluster of Thai leather traders on Charoen Rat Road opposite the railway station.

From Wongwian Yai along Prajadhipok Road to the north is Ban Khaek, a four-way intersection, where Prajadhipok cuts across Itsaraphap Roads on the boundary of Hiran Ruchi and Wat Kanlaya of Thon Buri with Somdet Chao Phraya of Khlong San. The intersection was named after the local Thai-Shia Muslim community known in Thai as Khaek Chao Zen, who have inhabited in the area since Thonburi period. Their ancestors came from Persia, the famous community figure is Sheikh Amad who came to Ayutthaya as a trader in the reign of King Songtham. After Ayutthaya was sacked, the Shia Muslim group migrated to Thonburi and have been living there ever since. When they perform their daily ritual, the men wear white shirts and hats with five folds representing five people respected by the Shia Muslim. They are mostly goldsmiths. There are also some group of Muslim from the south of Thailand migrated to this area since the beginning of Rattanakosin period.

Next to Ban Khaek up north before reaching the Chao Phraya River is Wongwian Lek, the traffic circle intersection, constructed during the reign of King Prajadhipok (Rama VII) in 1943 after the opening of the Memorial Bridge has made the area and communities in the vicinity progress commercially. The bridge connects Thonburi and Bangkok where many business areas such as Phahurat, Saphan Han, Sampheng, Ratchawong and Song Wat are situated. From this traffic circle, one could find buses to commute directly to their destinations within Bangkok. When it was first built, there was a small traffic circle and its surrounding grass lawn, without the clock tower which watch added later. The row houses on the roadside connecting the Memorial Bridge were built two-storied with tin roofs. In the vicinity of the circle, there were shops and parking areas for horse-drawn carriages and tricycles waiting for passengers to commute over to the Bangkok side. The food shops along the footpath rendered the area a busy and noisy atmosphere at night. Prior to the World War II, musical bands were arranged to play on Saturday and Sunday. Wongwian Lek is located at the foot of the Memorial Bridge in the Somdet Chao Phraya area of Khlong San, opposite Suksanari School in the Wat Kanlaya area of Thon Buri. The traffic circle was removed in 1983 to make way for the construction of Phra Pok Klao Bridge, which runs parallel to the Memorial Bridge across the Chao Phraya River. Today, apart from Tha Phra Chan, it is one of Bangkok's well-known markets for Buddha amulets. The site also features a newly built clock tower, constructed by ICONSIAM to commemorate the original clock tower that once stood there.

== Places ==
- Statue of King Taksin
- Wongwian Yai Market and Bang Yi Ruea Market
- Charoen Rat leather cluster
- Robinson Department Store, Lardya (currently is Platform Wongwian Yai)
- Wongwian Yai Complex
- Merry Kings Department Store, Wongwian Yai (abandoned)

== Transportation ==
The circle is one of the BMTA bus hubs on the Thonburi side of the river. There are bus stops at all four roads around the circle, for bus lines: 2-37 (3), 3-36 (4), 4-36 (7), 4-48 (7A), 4-37 (9), 4-42 (15), 4-4 (20), 4-6 (21), 4-49 (37), 4-10 (42), 4-11 (43), 4-41 (57), 4-15 (82), 4-46 (84), 4-16 (85), 4-42 (111), 4-21 (120), 4-53 (149), 4-56 (165), 2-22 (175), 2-24E (505), 4-28 (529), 1-32E, 4-35

Wongwian Yai railway station on the Maeklong Railway runs commuter rail services to Samut Sakhon (Maha Chai Line) and Samut Songkhram Province (Ban Laem Line). There is also a BTS Skytrain station located further south, Wongwian Yai, the Silom Line extension from Taksin Bridge Station. It is at Taksin intersection, 1 km south of the circle, and was opened on 15 May 2009.

== See also ==
- King Taksin
- Thonburi
