= Kian Un Keng Shrine =

Coordinates: 13°45′23.83″N 100°29′33.17″E

- ศาลเจ้าเกียนอันเกง
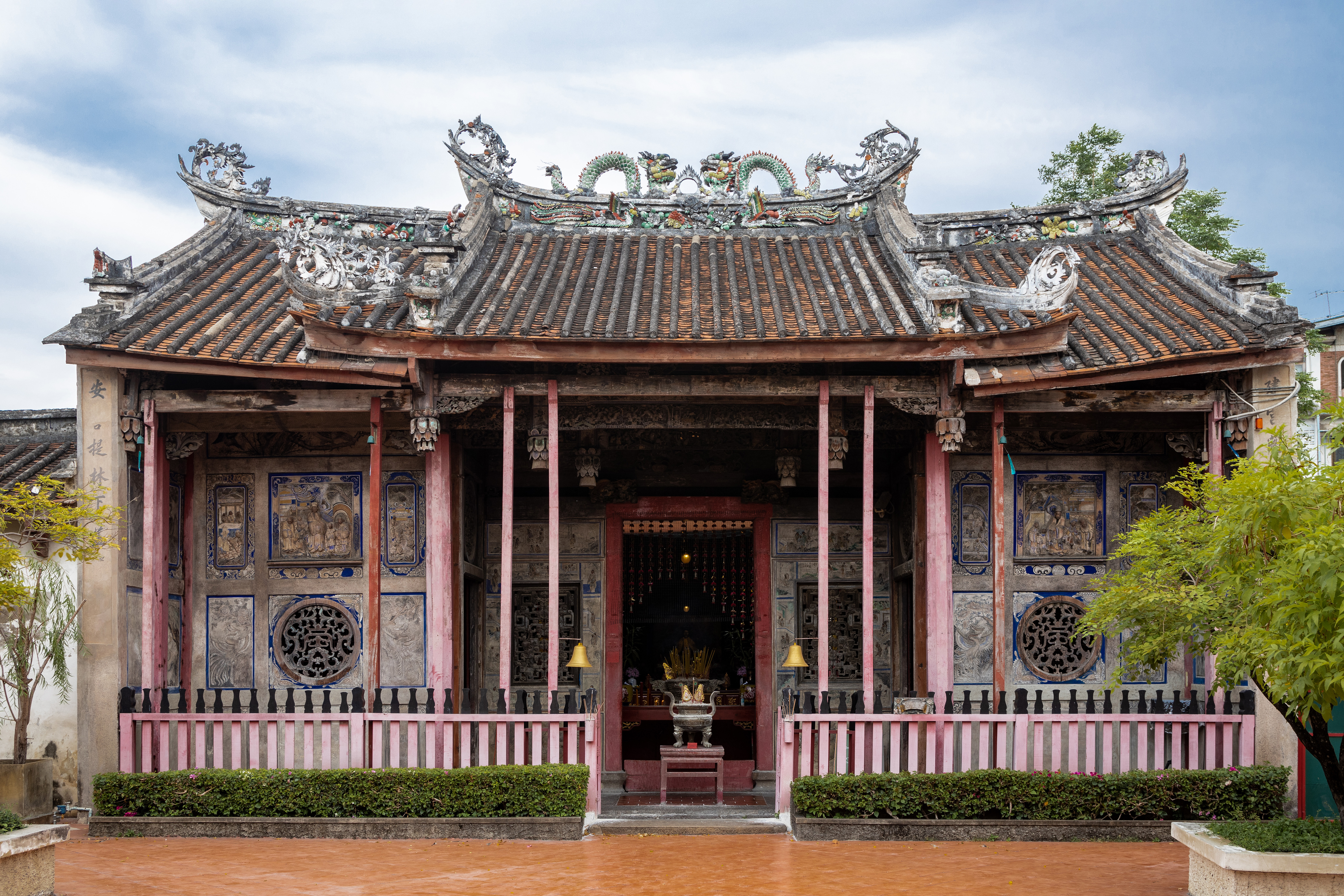
- Kian Un Keng Shrine frontage

- Location within Bangkok

Religion
- Affiliation: Buddhism
- Sect: Mahāyāna
- Region: Central
- Deity: Guanyin

Location
- Location: 582 Arun Amarin Rd, Wat Kanlaya, Thon Buri, Bangkok
- Country: Thailand
- Interactive map of Kian Un Keng Shrine

Architecture
- Type: Joss house
- Style: Chinese
- Founder: Hoklo people

Kian Un Keng Shrine or spelled Kuan An Keng Shrine (Thai: ศาลเจ้าเกียนอันเกง; Chinese: 建安宮; pinyin: Jiàn'ān gōng), known internationally as Guanyin Shrine (ศาลเจ้าแม่กวนอิม), is an ancient Chinese joss house in Bangkok, located on the western bank of Chao Phraya River, Wat Kanlaya Subdistrict, Thon Buri District, Thonburi side in the area of Kudi Chin community close to other places of worship including Wat Prayurawongsawat, Wat Kalayanamitr and Santa Cruz Church with Bang Luang Mosque.

This shrine is a Hokkien temple. It's one of the oldest shrines in Thonburi and Thailand by King Taksin and brought the Goddess Guanyin statue to be enshrined here. The Guanyin Bodhisattva is different from other shrines because mostly the Guanyin in other shrines are in standing position, but here the Guanyin is in sitting position. The Guanyin statue is made of wood carved and coated with gold. There are also murals and paintings of the classical novel Romance of Three Kingdoms, including dolls decorated on the wall decorations for visiting and worshipping.

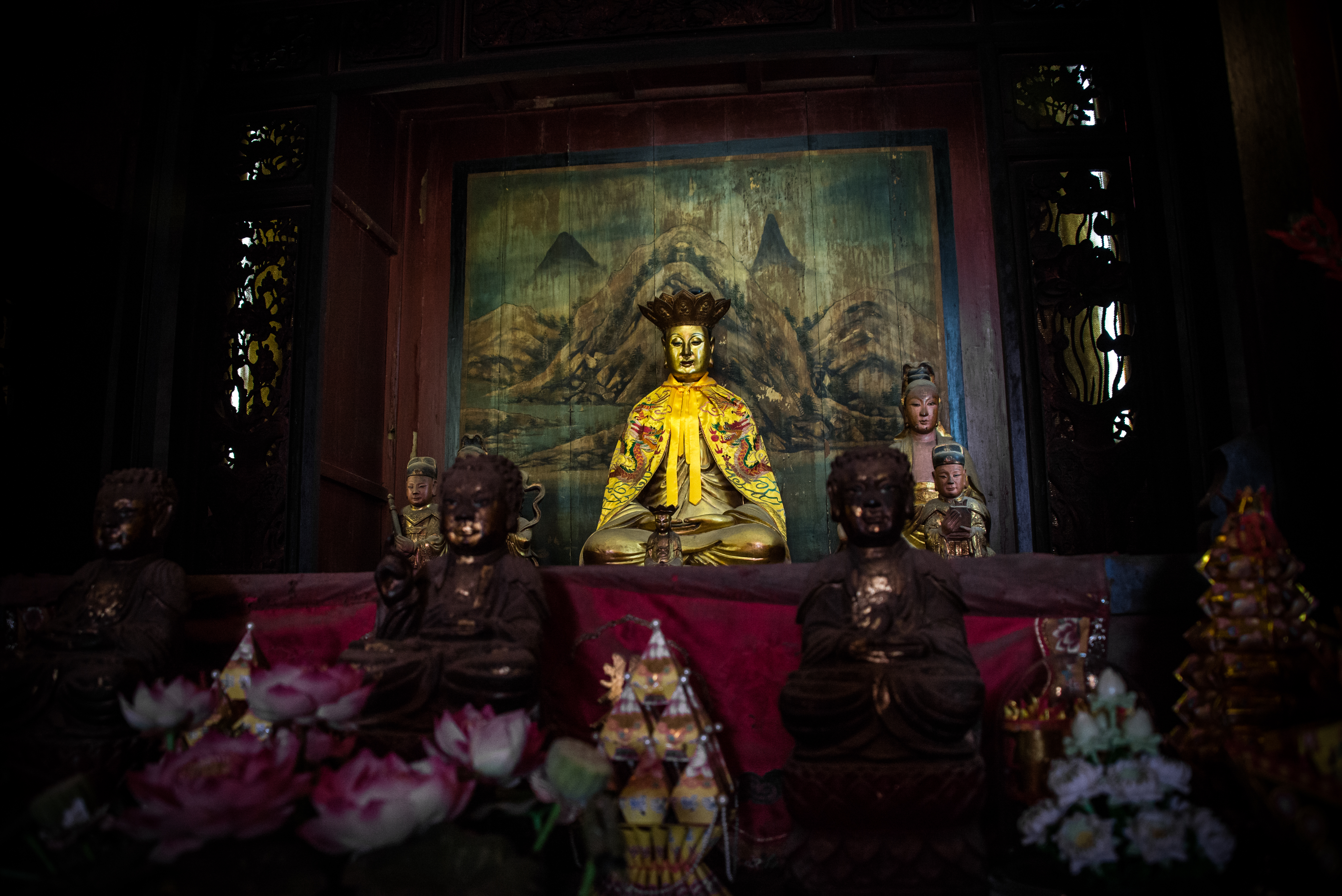
Principal Guanyin statue

The artist Fua Haripitak praised the artistic values of both painting and wood carving objects here. He decided that the door keepers paintings are showcases of different artists. Even the door, each side of it was created by different artisans. Both of them are famous at that time.

Its name is assumed to be the origin of the name Kudi Chin, which means "Chinese monk's dwelling".

Originally, the shrine was divided into two shrines, Lord Guan and Chor Su Kong shrines. Later, both were in disrepair during the reign of King Taksin. During the reign of King Rama III, the Hoklo therefore demolished both shrines and rebuilt with Chinese courtyard architecture along with brought the Guanyin statue enshrined instead since then. Its name meaning "building that create peace and tranquility for the Hoklo".

It is currently under the care of Simasatian (or Shen, 沈) and Tantiwetchakun (or Chen, 陳) families, which are their offspring.

The shrine received the ASA Architectural Conservation Award in 2008.

Moreover, during the annually Vegetarian Festival this shrine will have a special event unlike other shrines. That is a ceremony similar to Loi Krathong in order change one's bad fortune for the people who make merit here. Including a boat trip to visit another shrine on opposite side of the river, Chó-su-kong Shrine in Talat Noi, Chinatown.

== See also ==
- Thian Fah Foundation– Another Guanyin shrine in Phra Nakhon side, Bangkok
