= Hiran Ruchi =

Coordinates: 13°43′44.04″N 100°29′26.16″E

Hiran Ruchi หิรัญรูจี
- Khwaeng
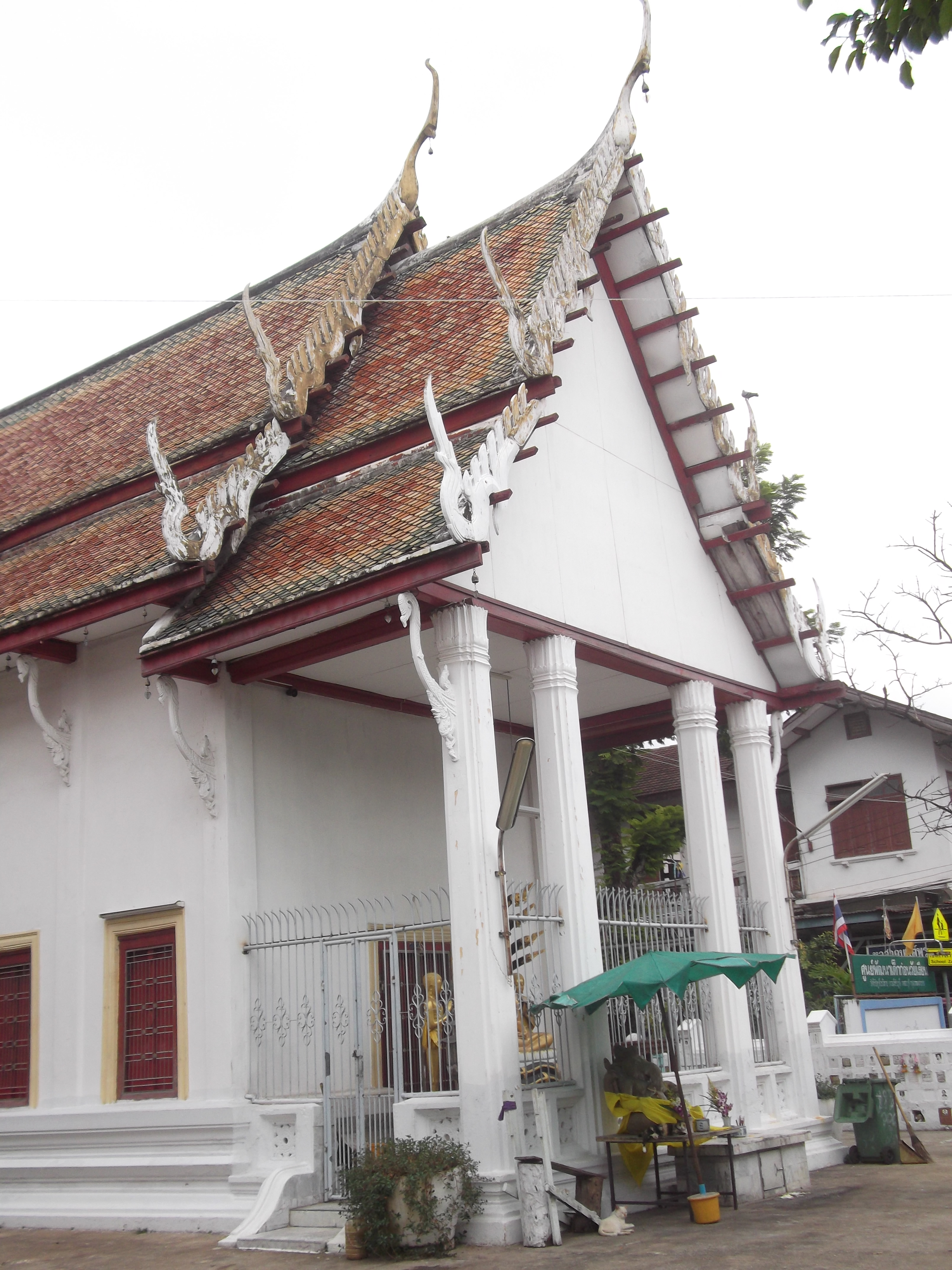
- The eponymous Wat Hiran Ruchi

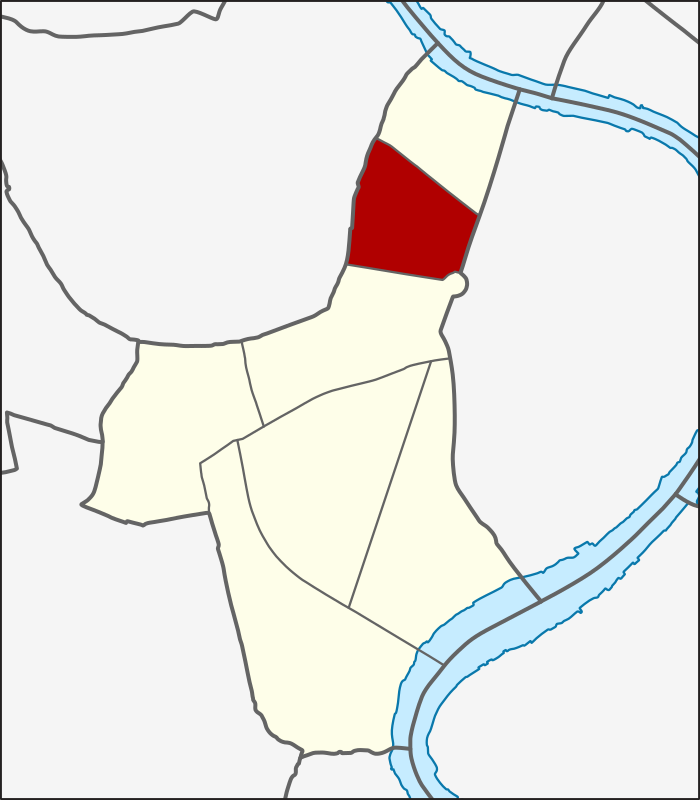
- Location in Thon Buri district
- Country: Thailand
- Province: Bangkok
- Khet: Thon Buri

Area
  - Total: 0.691 km^{2} (0.267 sq mi)

Population (2019)
  - Total: 11,906
  - Density: 17,230.1/km^{2} (44,626/sq mi)
- Time zone: UTC+7 (ICT)
- Postal code: 10600
- TIS 1099: 101502

Hiran Ruchi (Thai: หิรัญรูจี, pronounced [hìʔ.rān rūː.t͡ɕīː]) is a khwaeng (sub-district) of seven sub-districts in Thon Buri district, Bangkok.

== Naming ==
Hiran Ruchi is named after a local Thai Buddhist temple 'Wat Hiran Ruchi', a third-level royal temple of the Worawihan typle. Originally named Wat Noi. It is believed that it was built by wealthy Chinese Ngoen (father-in-law of King Rama II) during the reign of King Taksin circa 1778.

There is an ordination hall in the temple with the architecture of the reign of King Rama I which is Thai mixed with Chinese style. There are large six stūpas, wooden stūpa. A Buddha statue in the attitude of subduing Māra, named Luang Pho Dam is a principal Buddha statue.

== Geography ==
Hiran Ruchi is a northwest part of the district. The area covered from the inbound side of Intharaphithak Road to the left side of Wong Wian Yai (left side of King Taksin monument at Wong Wian Yai) up till the inbound side of Prajadhipok Road to Itsaraphap Road at Ban Khaek Intersection.

An area is bounded by other sub-districts (from north clockwise): Wat Kanlaya in its district (Itsaraphap Road is a borderline), Somdet Chao Phraya in Khlong San District (Prajadhipok Road is a borderline), Bang Yi Ruea in its district (Intharaphithak Road is a borderline), Wat Tha Phra in Bangkok Yai District (Khlong Bangkok Yai is a borderline).

== Places of interest ==
Hiran Ruchi is a historic area as well as its neighbouring, Wat Kanlaya. It is considered an area where people of various races and religions (Thai Buddhist, Chinese Buddhism, Christian, Islam, Mon) have coexisted since the Thonburi period more than 200 years ago.

- Ban Khaek, is a four-way intersection where Prajadhipok crosses with Itsaraphap Roads. Its name literally means 'house of Islamic', since it has been a community of Thai Muslims for a long time since the past and mixed with other religious beliefs of local people.
- Ban Sillapa Thai (Thai art house), the production house of Khon masks, dressing clothes and decoration for Khon plays, paper and plaster dolls and made-to-order works either for show or for house decoration. The house owner was selected from the National Cultural Committees to receive the award of distinguished cultural artist in the field of arts, crafts and craftsmanship of the central region (Bangkok Metropolitan) in 1991, including many other awards from various institutions.
- Ban Lao Community, also known as Bang Sai Kai Community, it has a population of over 1,000. Originally, the ancestors of the community migrated from Kingdom of Vientiane (now Vientiane, Laos) during the early of Rattanakosin period. Ban Lao is well known among the musicians who play Thai instruments, as being a source that produces extremely good quality khlui (Thai wooden flute). Originally, the people of Ban Lao only made khlui to play in their community, until around 1960s they have taken it up as a profession. But nowadays, only a handful of households still produce khlui. Ban Lao is a community located behind Bansomdejchaopraya Rajabhat University (BSRU) along canal Khlong Bang Sai Kai. The community has Wat Bang Sai Kai, also known as Wat Lao as the centre. Pla som (pickled fish) is a unique food of community.
