= Holy Rosary Church, Bangkok =

Holy Rosary Church
- Kalawar Church
- วัดแม่พระลูกประคำ (กาลหว่าร์)
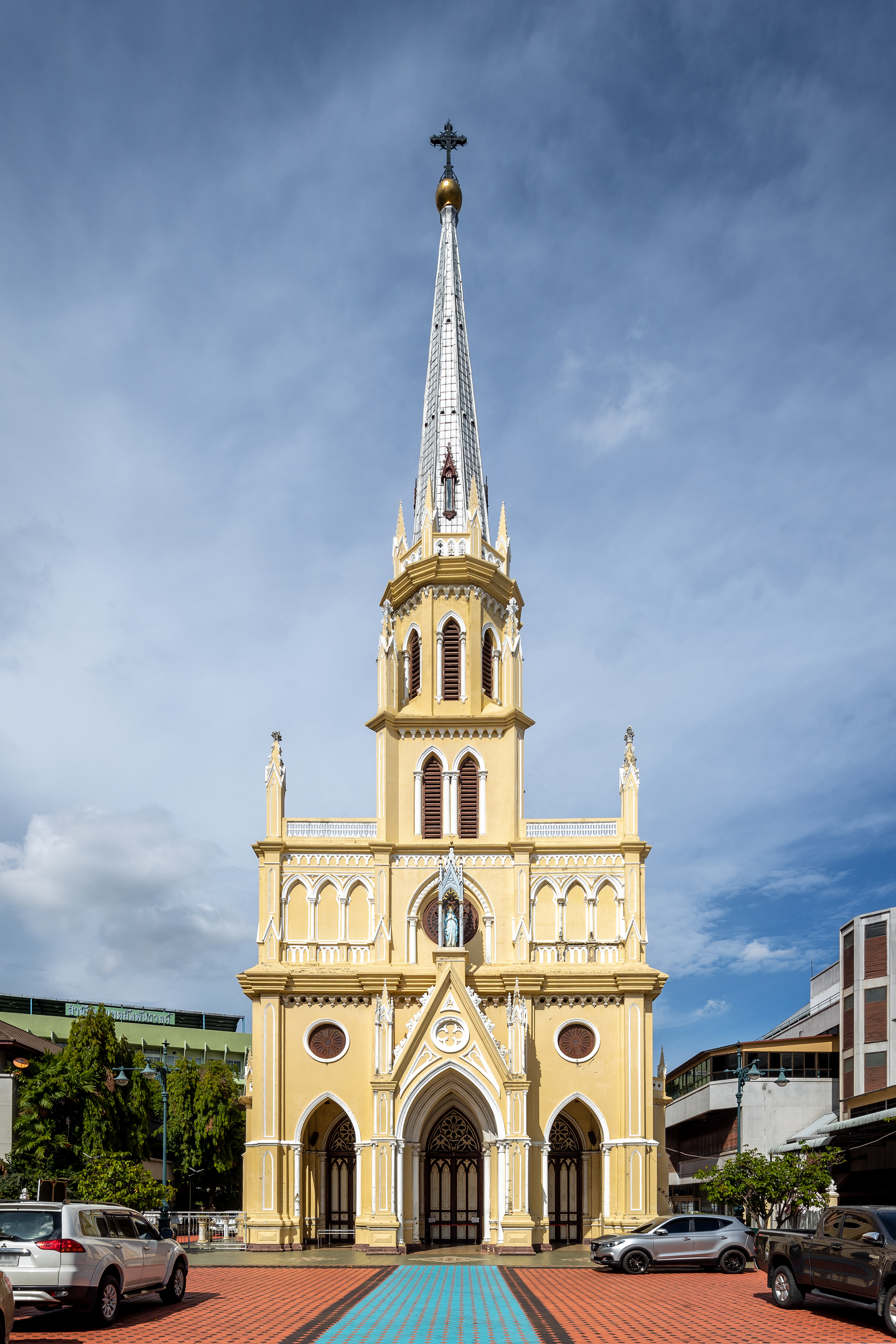
- Holy Rosary Church in June 2023

- Location within Bangkok
- 13°43′53″N 100°30′49″E
- Location: Bangkok
- Country: Thailand
- Denomination: Catholic
- Website: rosary.catholic.or.th

History
- Status: Parish church
- Founded: 1787
- Events: Rebuilt in 1838 & 1897

Architecture
- Architect: Father Desalles
- Style: Gothic Revival
- Years built: 1891–97
- Construction cost: 77,000 baht

Administration
- Archdiocese: Bangkok

The Holy Rosary Church (Thai: วัดแม่พระลูกประคำ, pronounced [wát mɛ̂ː pʰráʔ lûːk prā.kʰām]), also known as Kalawar Church (โบสถ์กาลหว่าร์, [bòːt kāːlāwàː]; from Portuguese: Calvario), is a Roman Catholic church in Bangkok. It is located in Samphanthawong District, on the eastern bank of the Chao Phraya River. The history of the church dates to 1769, when a group of Portuguese Catholics resettled in the area after the fall of Ayutthaya; the current church building, in Gothic Revival style, was built in 1891–97 on the site of two previous structures.

== History ==
When King Taksin established Thonburi as his capital following the fall of Ayutthaya in 1767, the Portuguese communities of Ayutthaya resettled in two areas of present-day Bangkok. Some followed the leadership of Father Jacques Corre, and settled on the west bank of the Chao Phraya River in the area now known as Kudi Chin where the Santa Cruz Church was soon established. Another faction, who had refused to accept the authority of the French Mission, settled on the eastern bank in an area now known as Talat Noi within Samphanthawong District. The latter brought with them two holy images: one of Our Lady of the Rosary, and the other of the Corpse of Christ. But without resident priests, they had no choice but to worship at Santa Cruz.

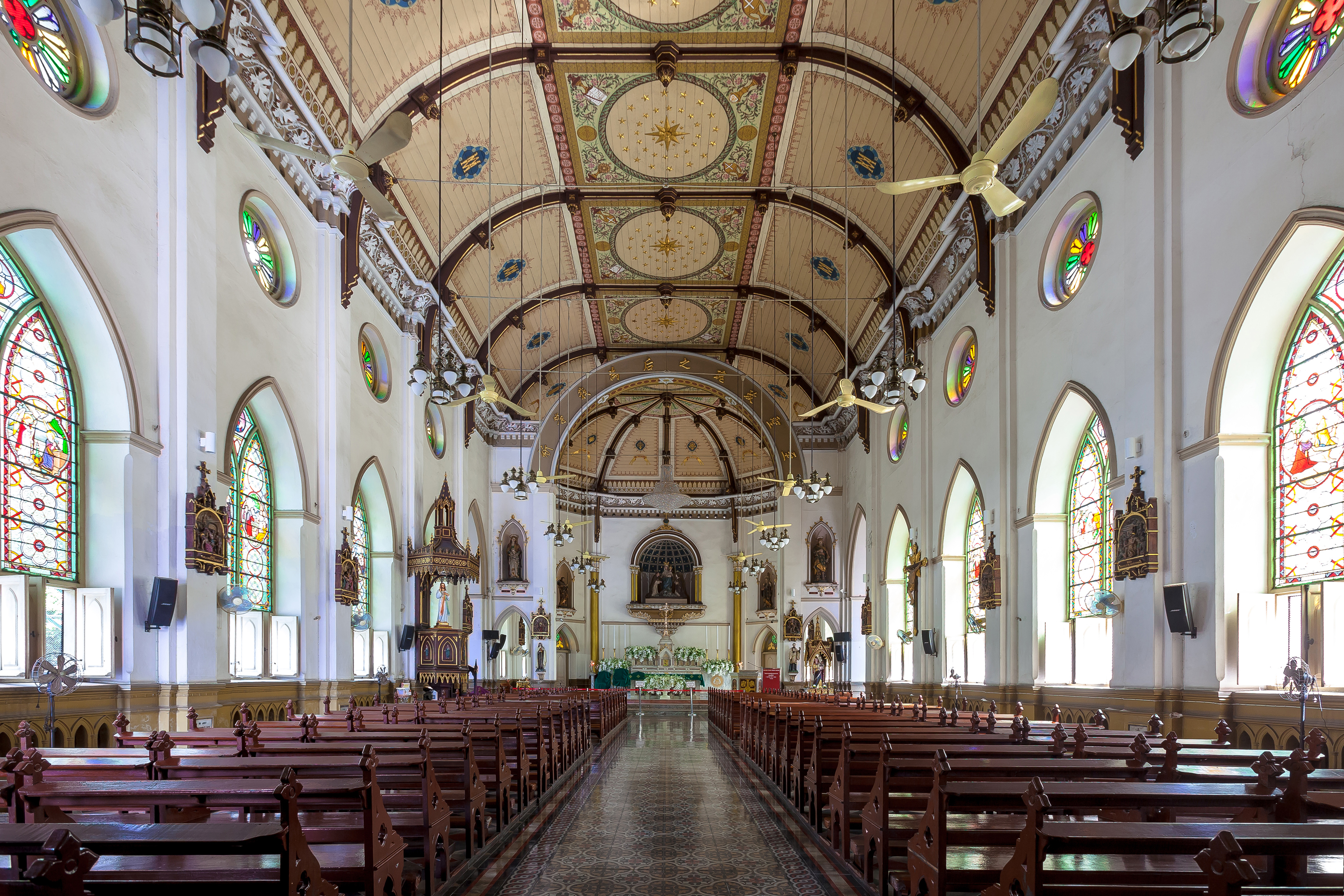
Interior.

A church was first built at the site in 1787. It was a stilted wooden structure. The residents, however, still had to rely on French priests, whom they gradually accepted. In 1822, the church finally established communion with the Holy See, coming under the authority of Bishop Esprit-Marie-Joseph Florens, the Vicar Apostolic of Siam. By then, the Portuguese community was gradually dispersing, and Chinese immigrants soon became the church's main attendees.

In 1838, a new church building, of wood on a masonry base, was built to replace the old damaged structure. It was consecrated on 1 October 1839, and formally dedicated to Our Lady of the Rosary. By 1890, the structure had fallen into disrepair, and the pastor, Father Desalles, arranged for the construction of a new building. Construction took place from 1891 to 1897; the new church was consecrated in October 1897, and remains in operation.

== Architecture ==
The current church was built in Gothic Revival style. It follows a cruciform floor plan, with the main façade facing the river. The steeple, with its cross-topped spire, is built into centre of the façade, behind a Gothic gable. The church employs Gothic-arched doors and windows throughout, and its stained glass work is among the most beautiful in Thailand.

The church is an unregistered ancient monument, and received the Association of Siamese architects' Architectural Conservation Award in 1987.
