= Baan Kudichin Museum =

Coordinates: 13°44′22″N 100°29′35″E

- พิพิธภัณฑ์บ้านกุฎีจีน
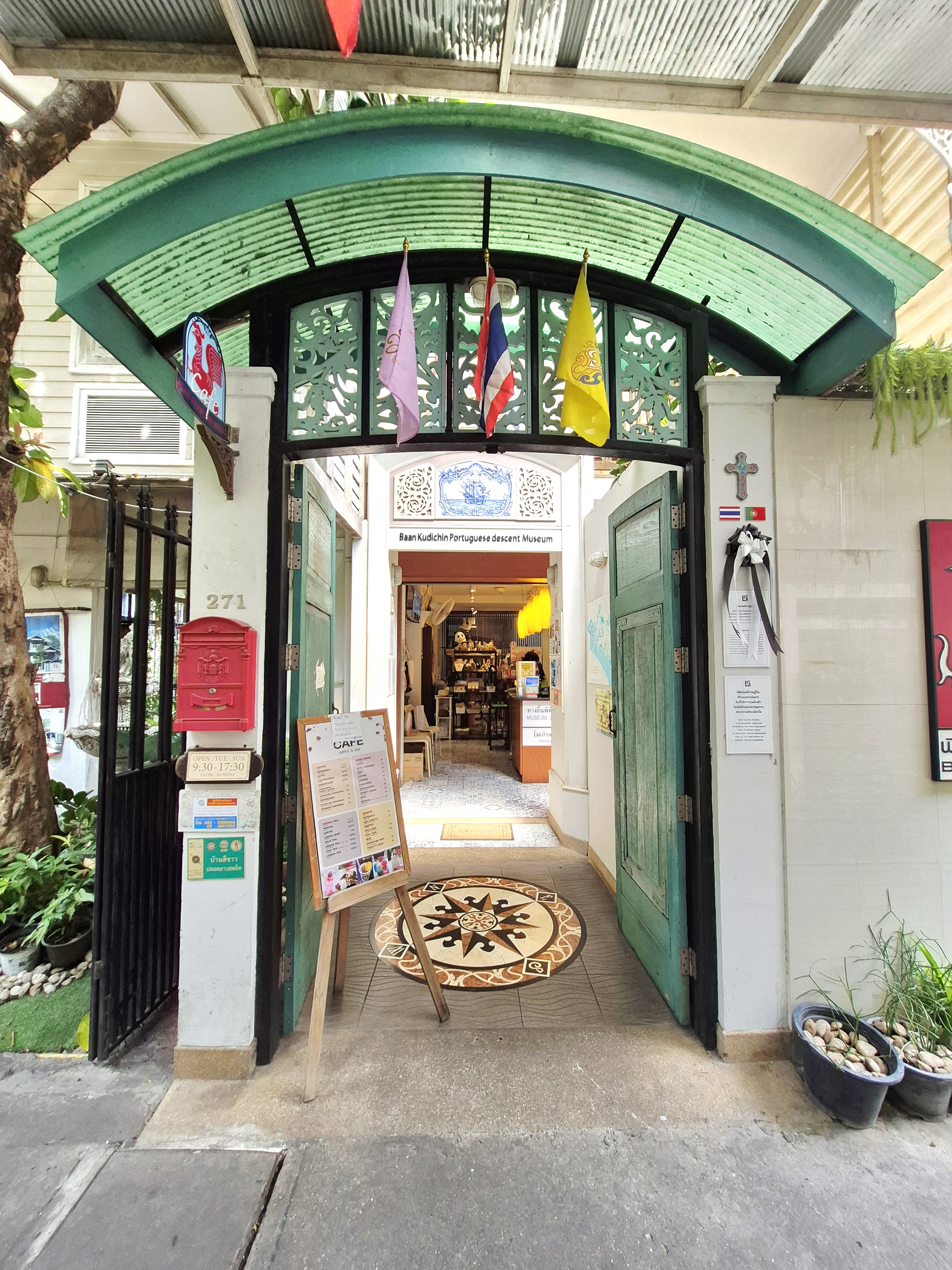
- Established: 2017
- Location: Kudi Chin, Bangkok, Thailand
- Type: History museum
- Founder: Nawinee Phongthai

The Baan Kudichin Museum (Thai: พิพิธภัณฑ์บ้านกุฎีจีน; RTGS: Phiphitthaphan Ban Kudi Chin) is a museum in Bangkok, Thailand, focused on the history of the Kudi Chin neighborhood. The museum features artifacts from the Portuguese community that has settled in Thailand from the Ayuthaya period to present, including tools used by early Kudi Chin residents and photos.

== History ==
The museum was founded in 2017 by Nawinee Phongthai (Thai: นาวินี พงศ์ไทย), a member of the Thoratranont family descended from Portuguese soldiers. The museum is funded with private donations.

== See also ==
- Kudi Chin
