= Kudi Chin =

Historic neighbourhood in Bangkok

Coordinates: 13°44′20″N 100°29′35″E

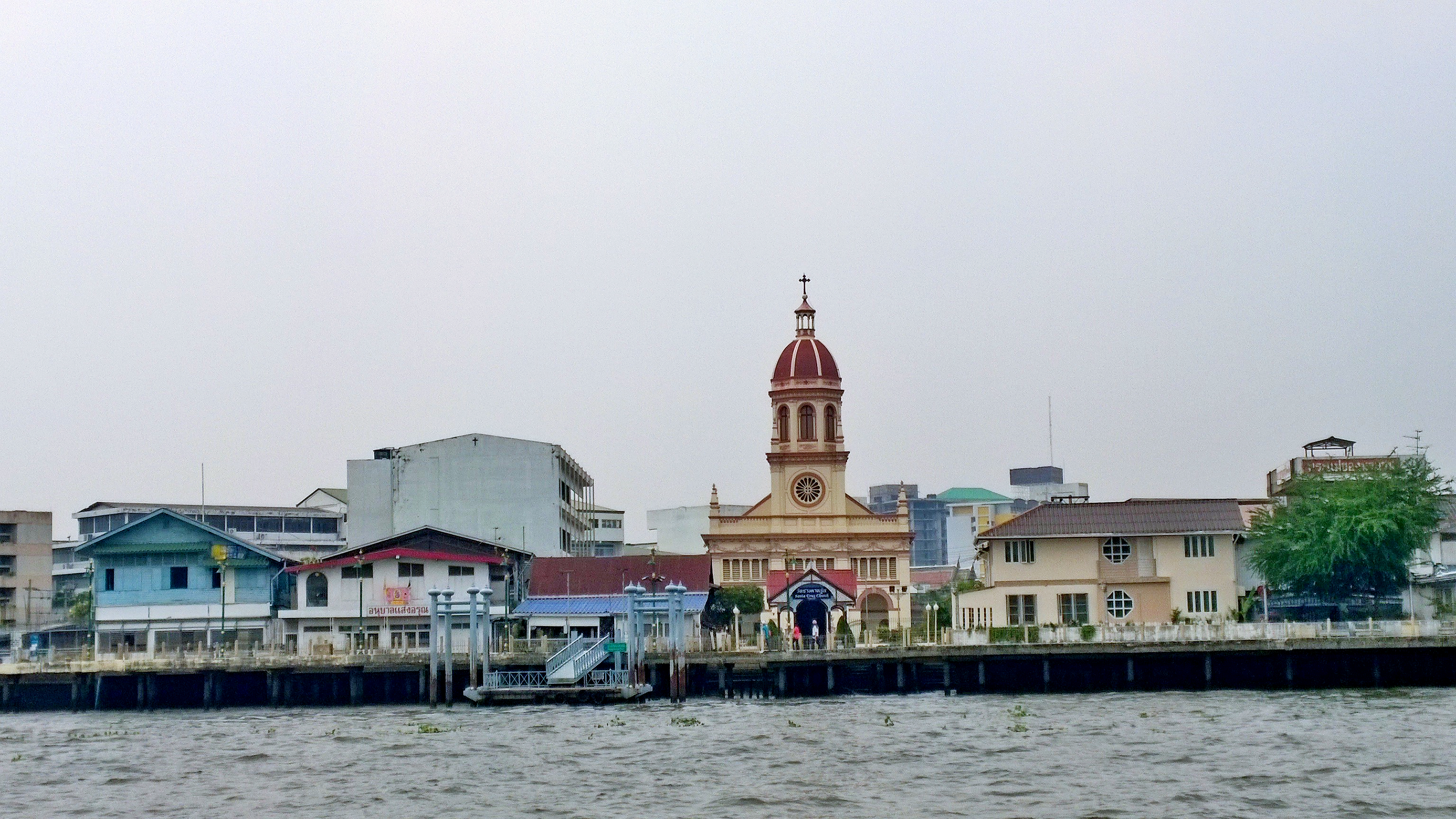
Santa Cruz Church and Kudi Chin community as seen from opposite side (Pak Khlong Talat)

Kudi Chin (Thai: กุฎีจีน, pronounced [kūdīː tɕīːn]) or Kadi Chin (กะดีจีน, [kādīː tɕīːn]), also spelled "Kudee Jeen", etc. is a historic neighbourhood in Bangkok. It is in Wat Kanlaya Sub-district, Thon Buri District, on the west bank of the Chao Phraya River, south of Bangkok Yai Canal. The neighbourhood, dating to the Ayutthaya period, includes communities of several faiths living in close proximity. Today, it is best known for the Catholic community (mainly of Portuguese descendants) around Santa Cruz Church, but the wider neighbourhood also includes the areas around Wat Kanlayanamit, Kudi Khao Mosque, and the Chinese Kuan An Keng Shrine. Conservation and revitalization efforts beginning in 2008 have made the neighbourhood a cultural tourism destination.

== History ==
The neighbourhood, dating to the Ayutthaya period, includes communities of several faiths living in close proximity. It can be divided into a total of six communities, which consists of people of various races including Thai Buddhists, Mon, Chinese, Portuguese and Thai Muslims.

For the Portuguese, they received the plot of land from the King Taksin in this area. They emigrated from Ayutthaya after fell in 1767, along with other ethnic groups. Later in 1769, there was a construction of a Catholic church called Santa Cruz Church as it appears today. Their land is considered a land under the administration of Roman Catholic Archdiocese of Bangkok from the past. Therefore, absolutely do not resell or transfer ownership to third parties. There are three types of land and church like this in Bangkok Metropolitan Region, in addition to the Kudi Chin, including Holy Rosary Church in Talat Noi, Immaculate Conception Church in Sam Sen, and Immaculate Heart of Mary Church in Phra Pradaeng, Samut Prakan.

Today, it is best known for the Catholic community (Portuguese descendants), in 2014, they have a population of about 1,850 people in 293 households) around Santa Cruz Church, but the wider neighbourhood also includes the areas around Wat Kanlayanamit, Kudi Khao Mosque, and the Chinese Kuan An Keng Shrine. All linked to each other by bicycle lane and promenade along the Chao Phraya River. Conservation and revitalization efforts beginning in 2008 have made the neighbourhood a cultural tourism destination.

The symbol of this community is rooster which is adapted from Rooster of Barcelos, or Galo de Barcelos in Portuguese, which is the national emblem of Portugal to indicate the roots of the community.

Its name "Kudi Chin" or "Kadi Chin" meaning "Chinese monk's dwelling", refers to Santa Cruz Church, also known as Kudi Chin. However, it has an explanation that should refer to the Chinese temple on the Chao Phraya River that had been built since the Ayuthaya period. Until the time passed to Thonburi and Rattanakosin periods, it has deteriorated. Therefore being rebuilt as the current Kuan An Keng Shrine.

== Notable sites ==
- Baan Kudichin Museum

== Gallery ==
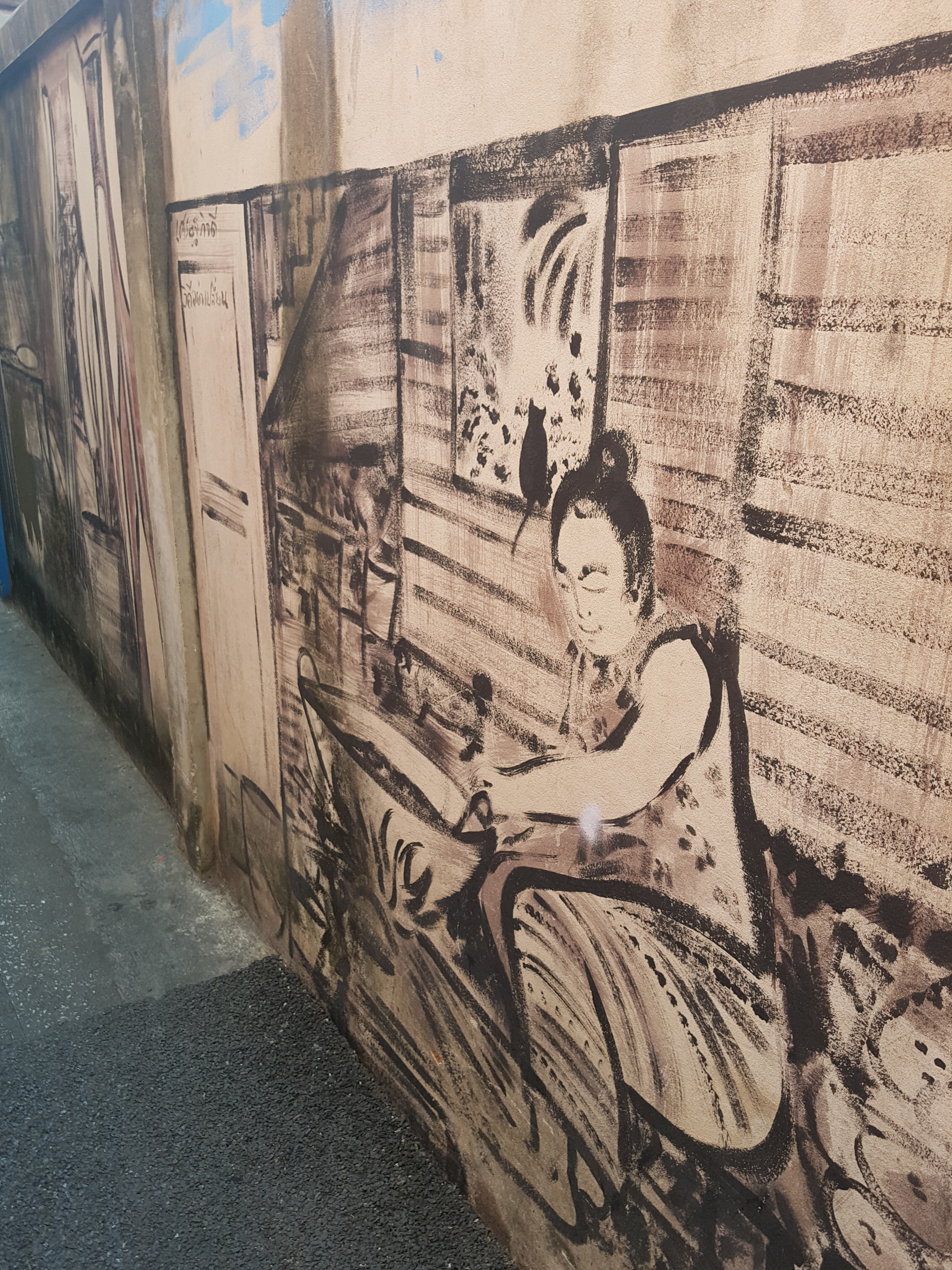
Chic graffiti on the wall in 2017

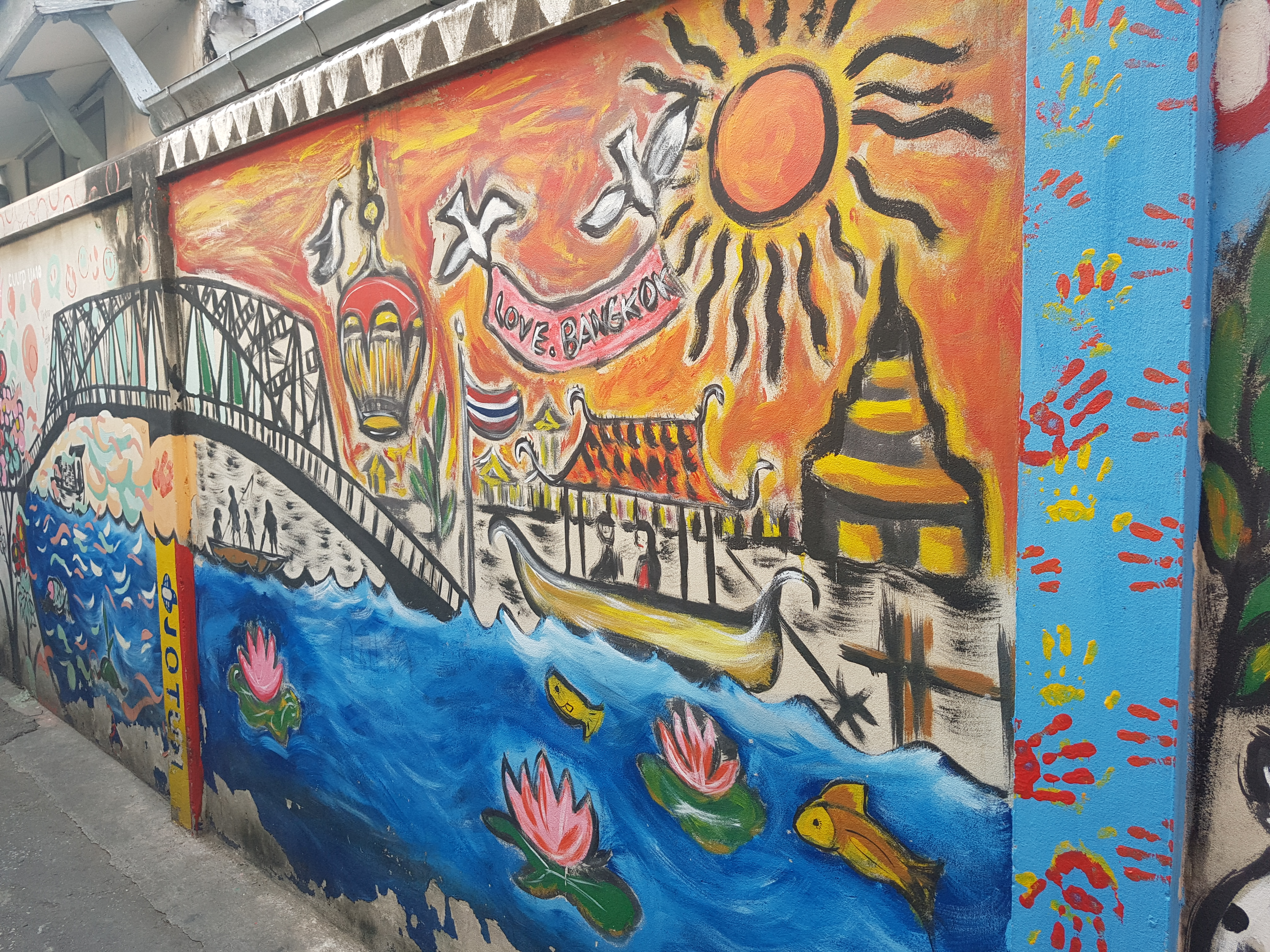
Another chic graffiti

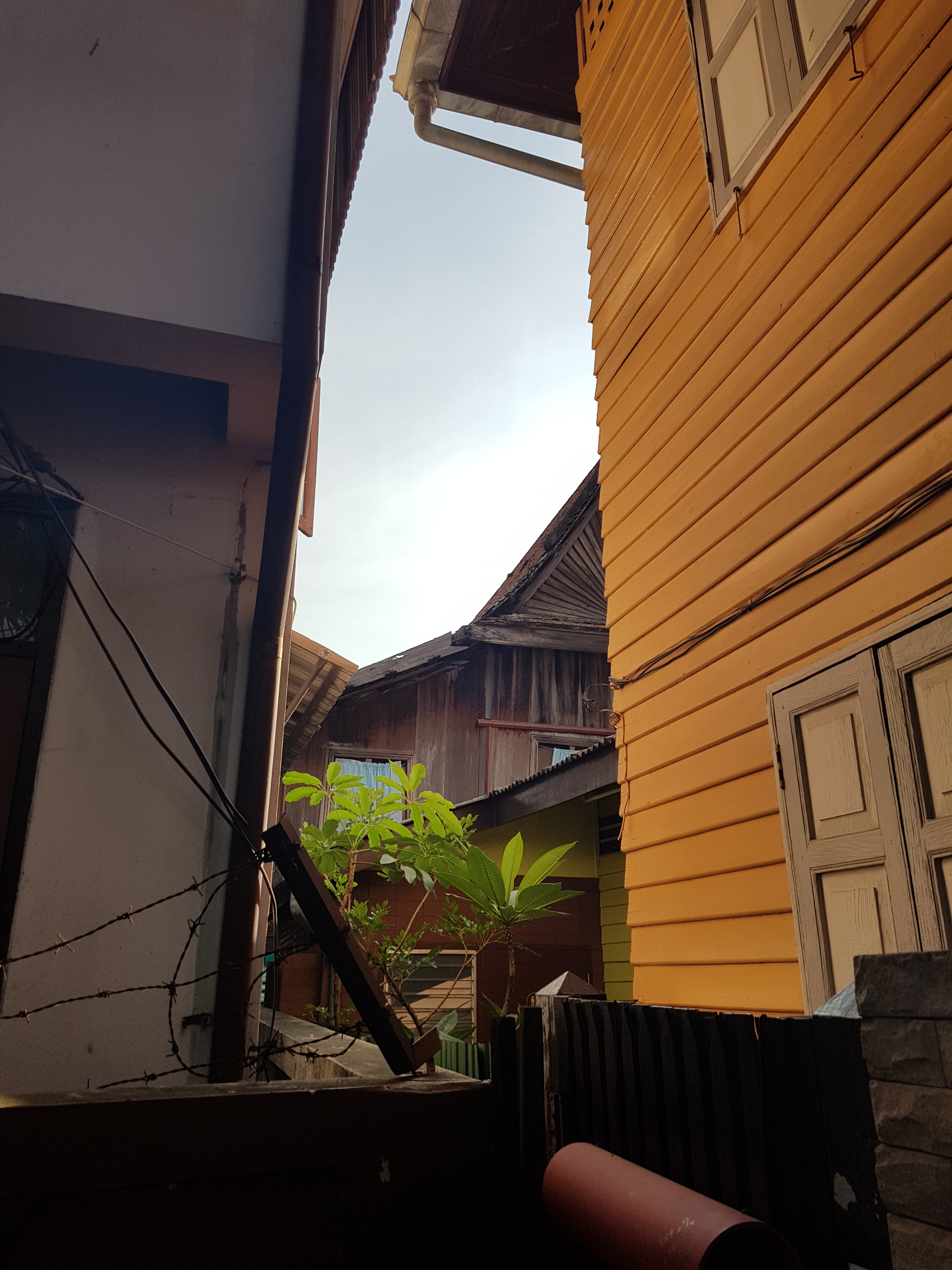
The condition of the community houses

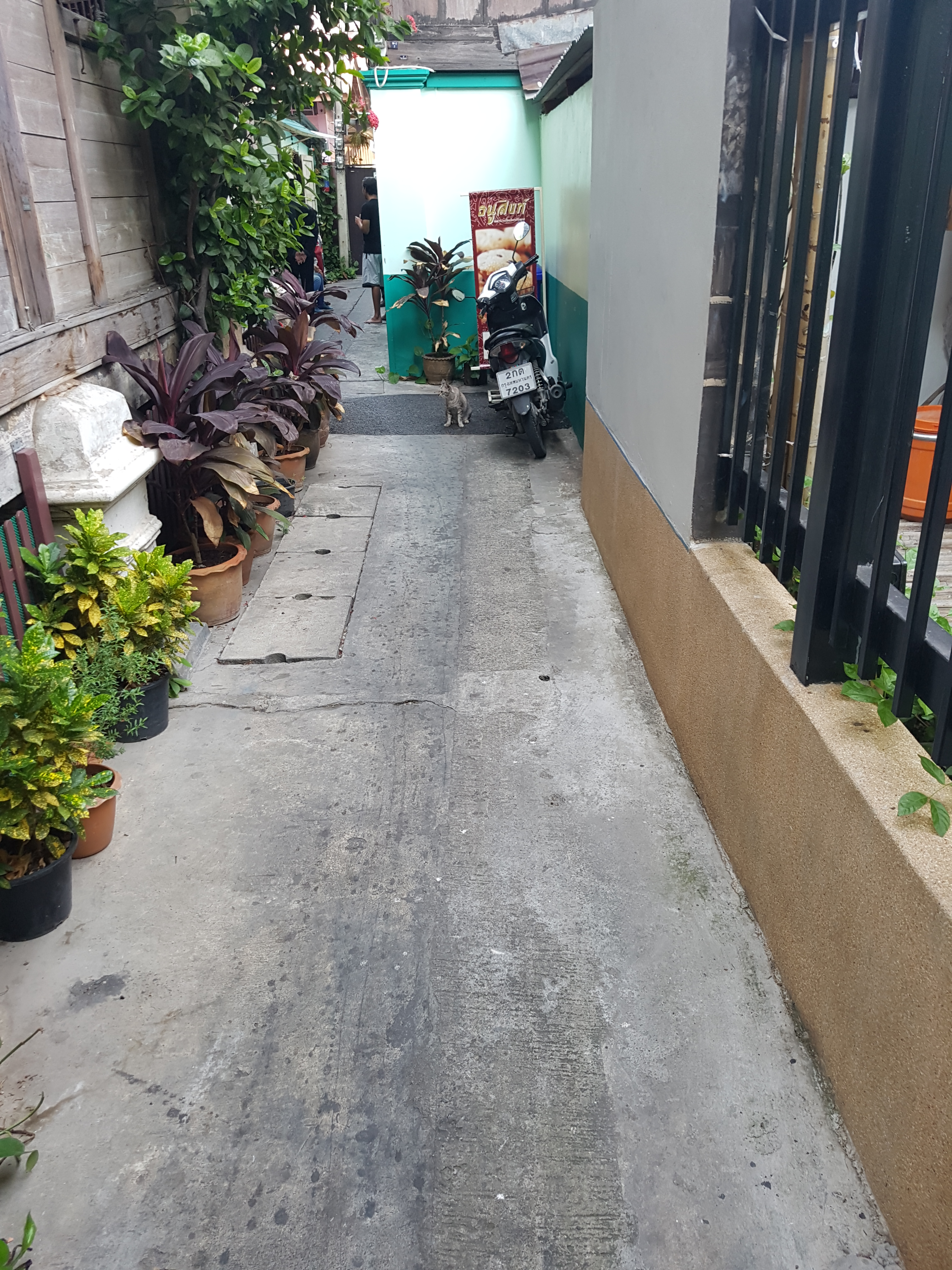
Narrow path leading to Thanusingh Bakery House

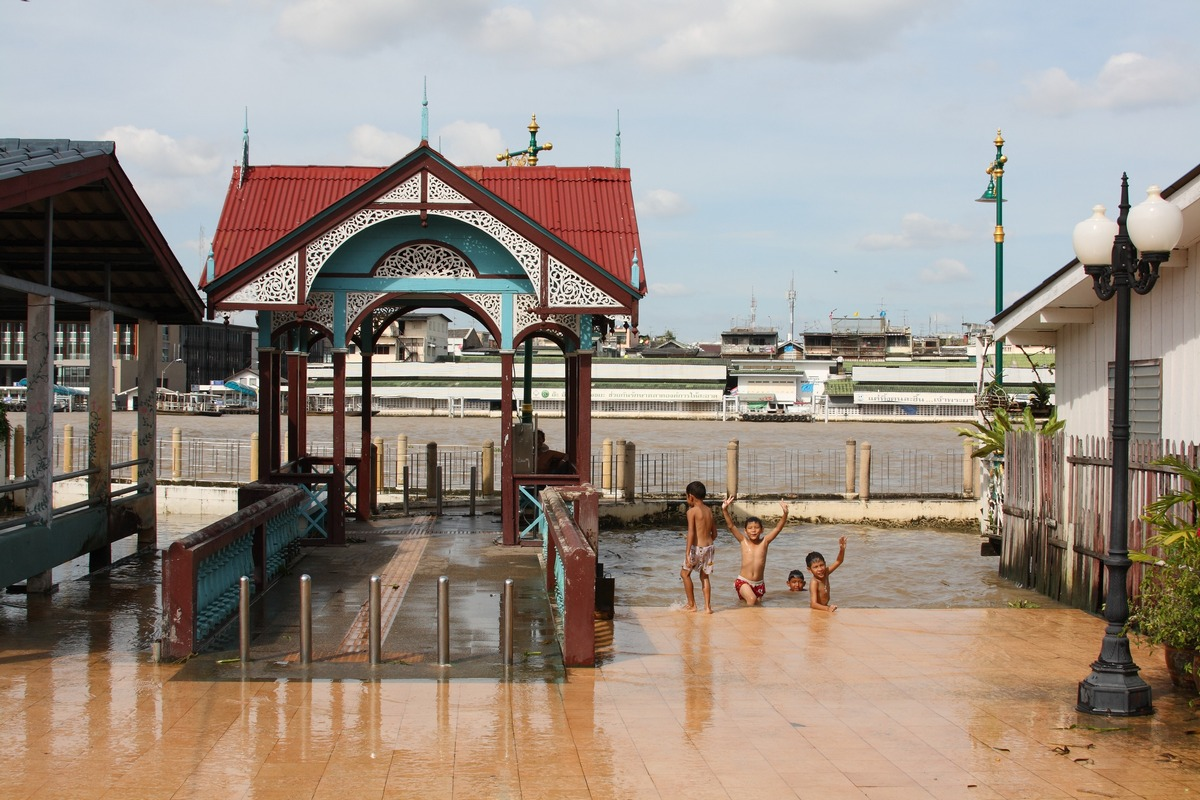
Kudi Chin during 2011 great floods

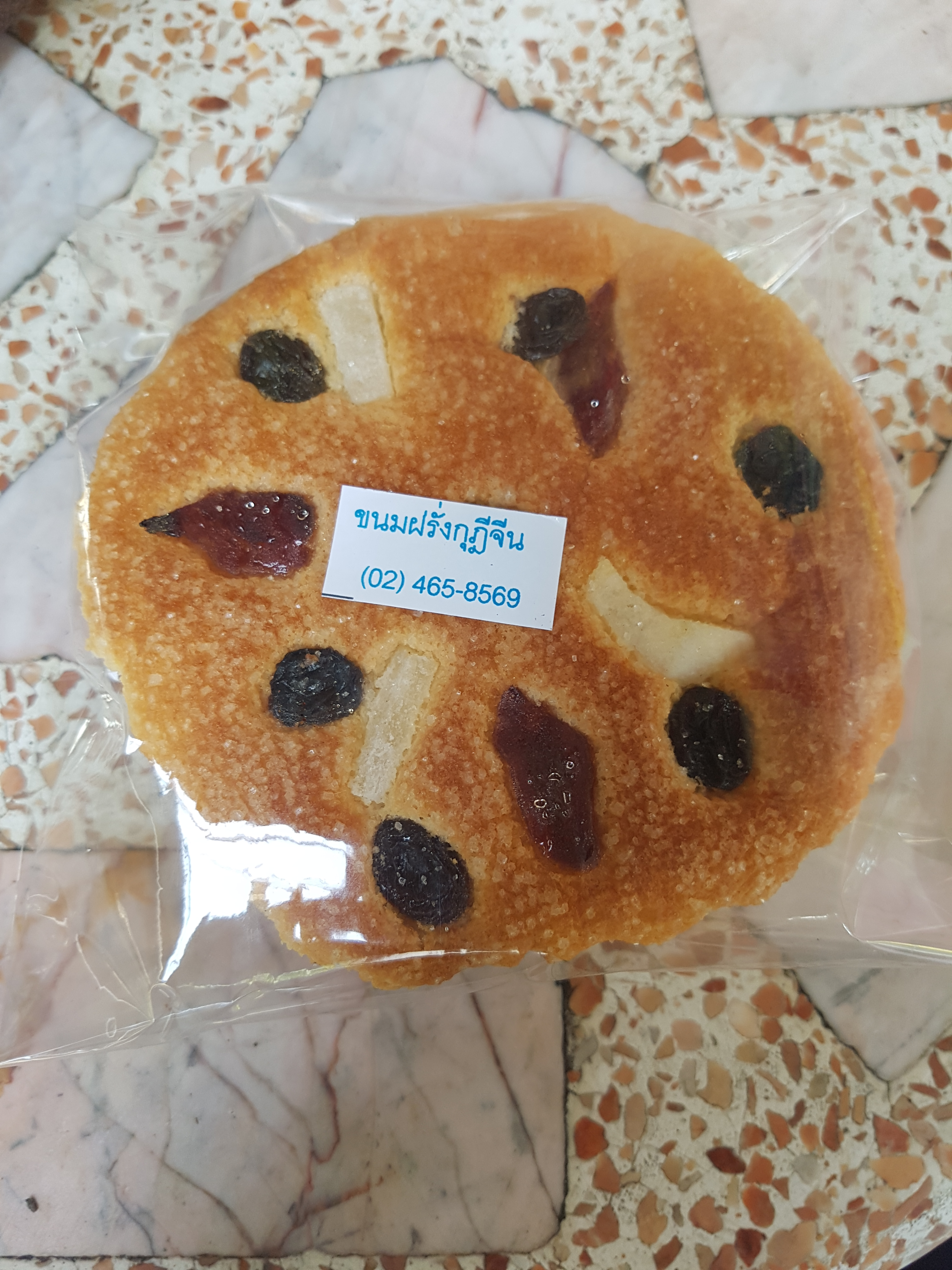
Khanom farang kudi chin

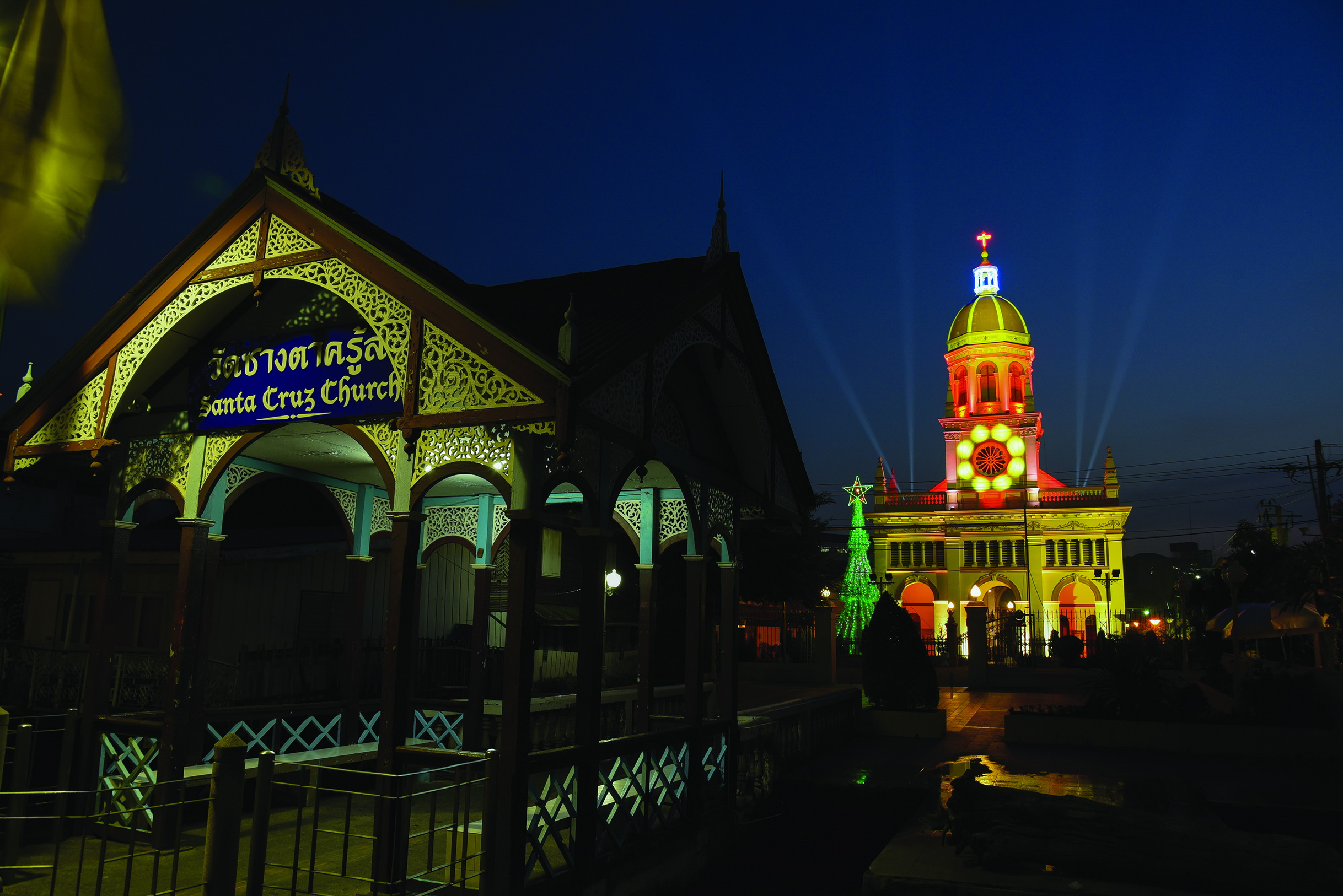
Santa Cruz Church and pier in night time

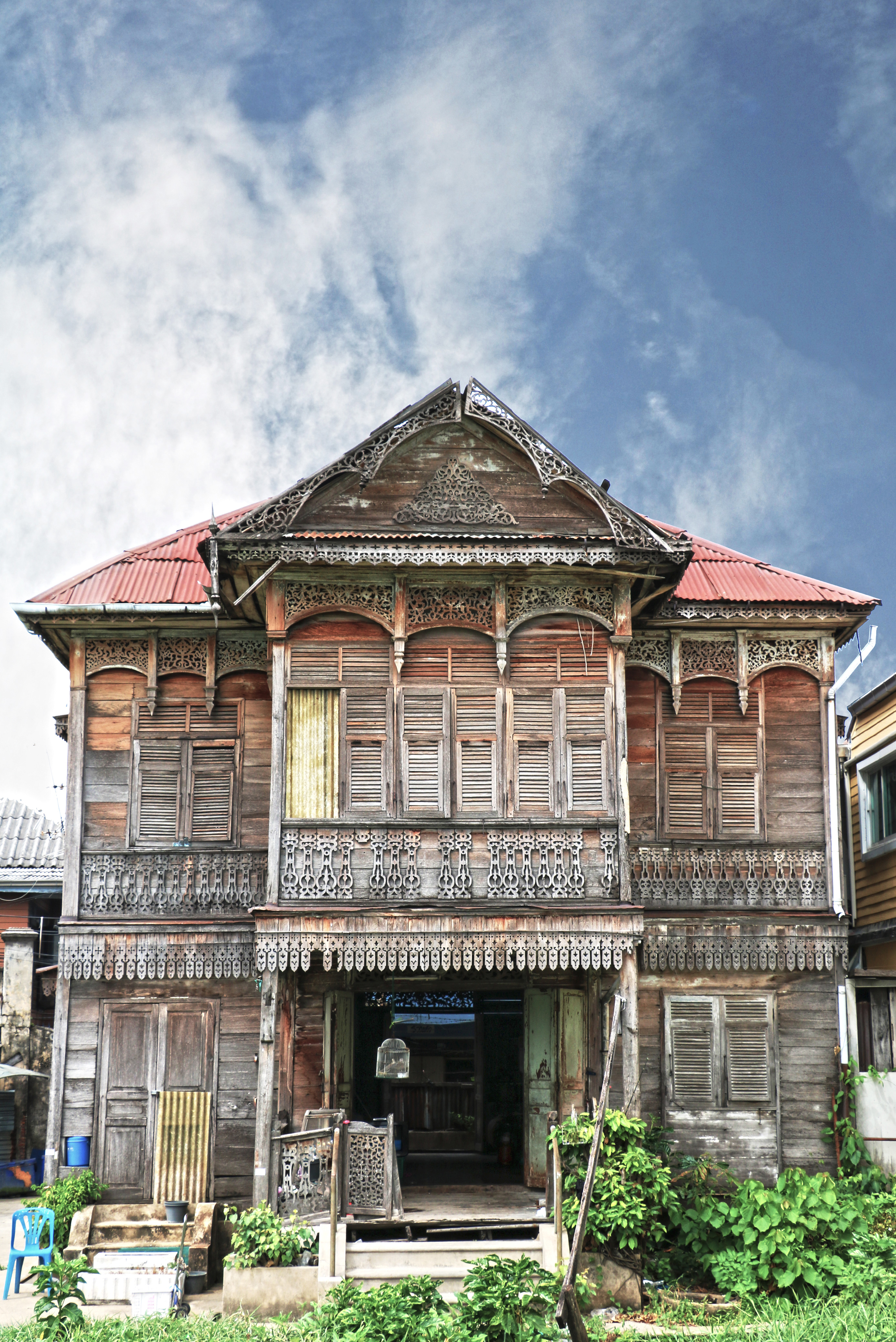
Windsor House

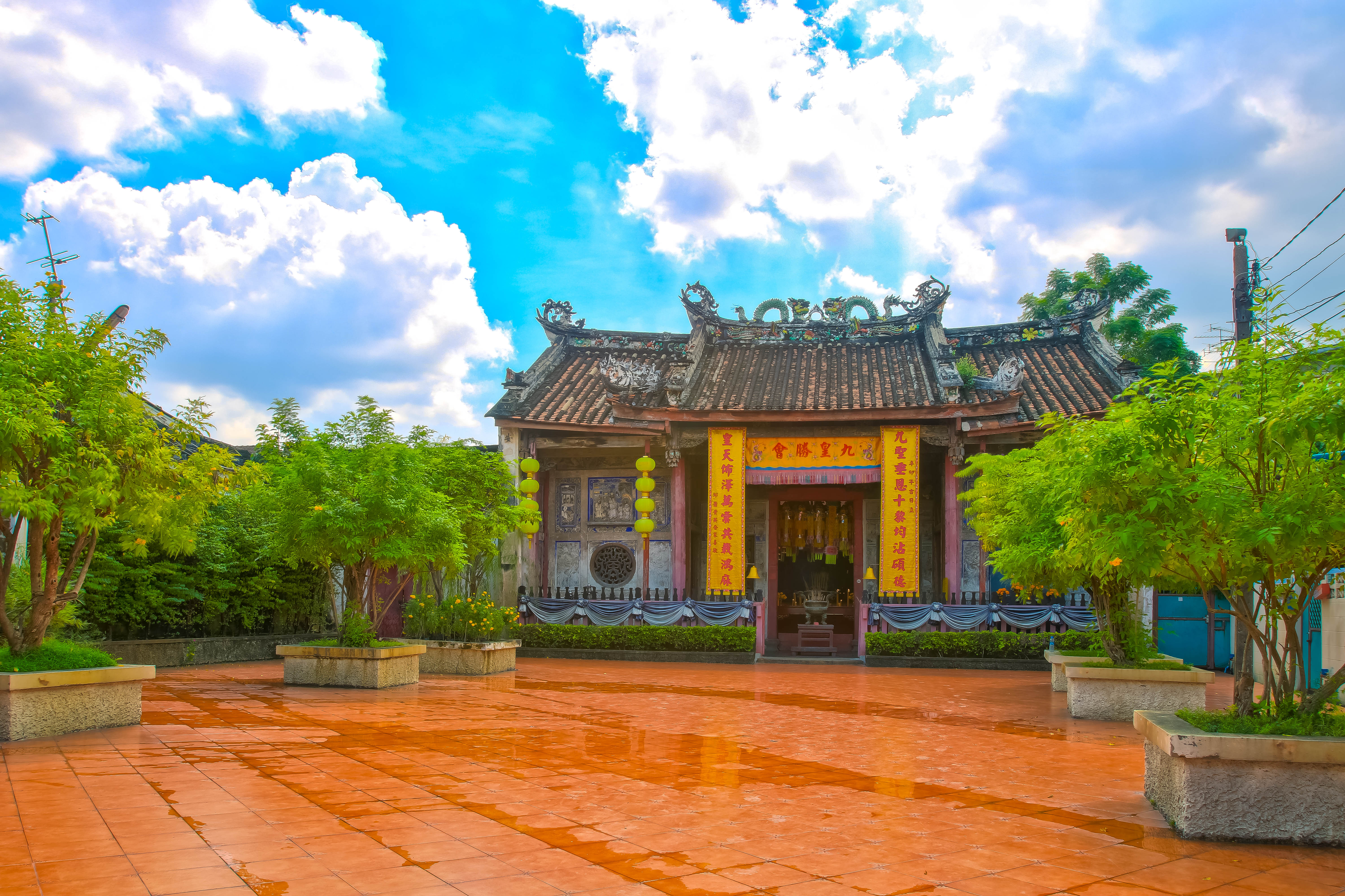
Kuan An Keng Shrine, the shrine of Guanyin and the origin of community's name
