= Intharaphithak Road =

Street in Bangkok, Thailand

Coordinates: 13°43′39.75″N 100°29′21.31″E

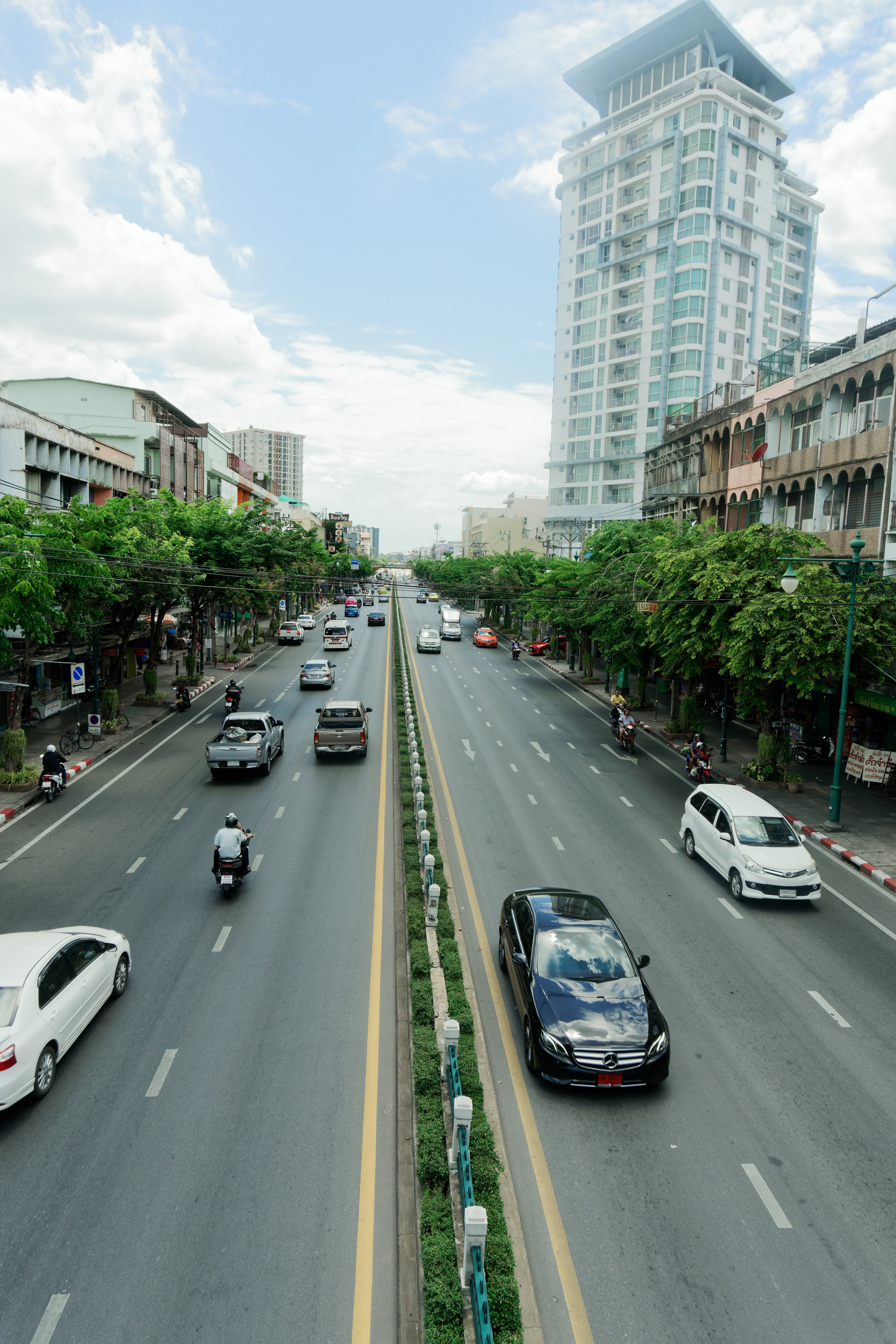
Intharaphithak Road (view toward Bang Yi Ruea Junction)

Intharaphithak Road (Thai: ถนนอินทรพิทักษ์, pronounced [tʰà.nǒn ʔin.tʰrá.pʰí.tʰák]) is a short stretch in Bangkok, located on the Thonburi side. Begins at Wongwian Yai, the site of the King Taksin Monument, and runs westward, crossing Khlong Bang Sai Kai and intersecting at Bang Yi Ruea Junction, including a three-way intersection with Thoet Thai Road, which leads to Talat Phlu. The road ends at the foot of Naowa Chamnian Bridge, which spans Khlong Bangkok Yai. Beyond this point, the route continues as Phetkasem Road (Highway 4), one of Thailand's main highways and a main route to the southern region.

The distance is 780 m (2,559.1 ft) and also serves as an administrative boundary. The side facing Wongwian Yai lies in Hiran Ruchi Subdistrict, while the opposite side is in Bang Yi Ruea Subdistrict; both are part of Thon Buri District.

Constructed in 1929 in preparation for the 150th anniversary of the Rattanakosin (modern day Bangkok) era in April 1932, alongside a major infrastructure development project: the construction of Memorial Bridge across the Chao Phraya River, linking the Phra Nakhon side (the historic main core) with Thonburi (the western bank). As part of this development, eleven new roads were built on the Thonburi side, and Intharaphithak Road was one of them. The name "Intharaphithak" was given in honor of Prince Inthraphithak (also known as "Chui"), the eldest son and viceroy of King Taksin of Thonburi. It is considered the shortest road in the vicinity of Wongwian Yai.

At the eastern corner of Bang Yi Ruea Junction stands the Thonburi Telephone Exchange, a historic building notable for its classic European architectural style, constructed before 1957.

In early February 2018, Intharaphithak Road recorded a PM2.5 level of 91 µg/m^{3}, exceeding standard limits and ranking among the highest in Bangkok at the time, comparable to levels recorded along Lat Phrao Road on the Phra Nakhon side.
