= Lat Ya Road =

Street in Bangkok, Thailand

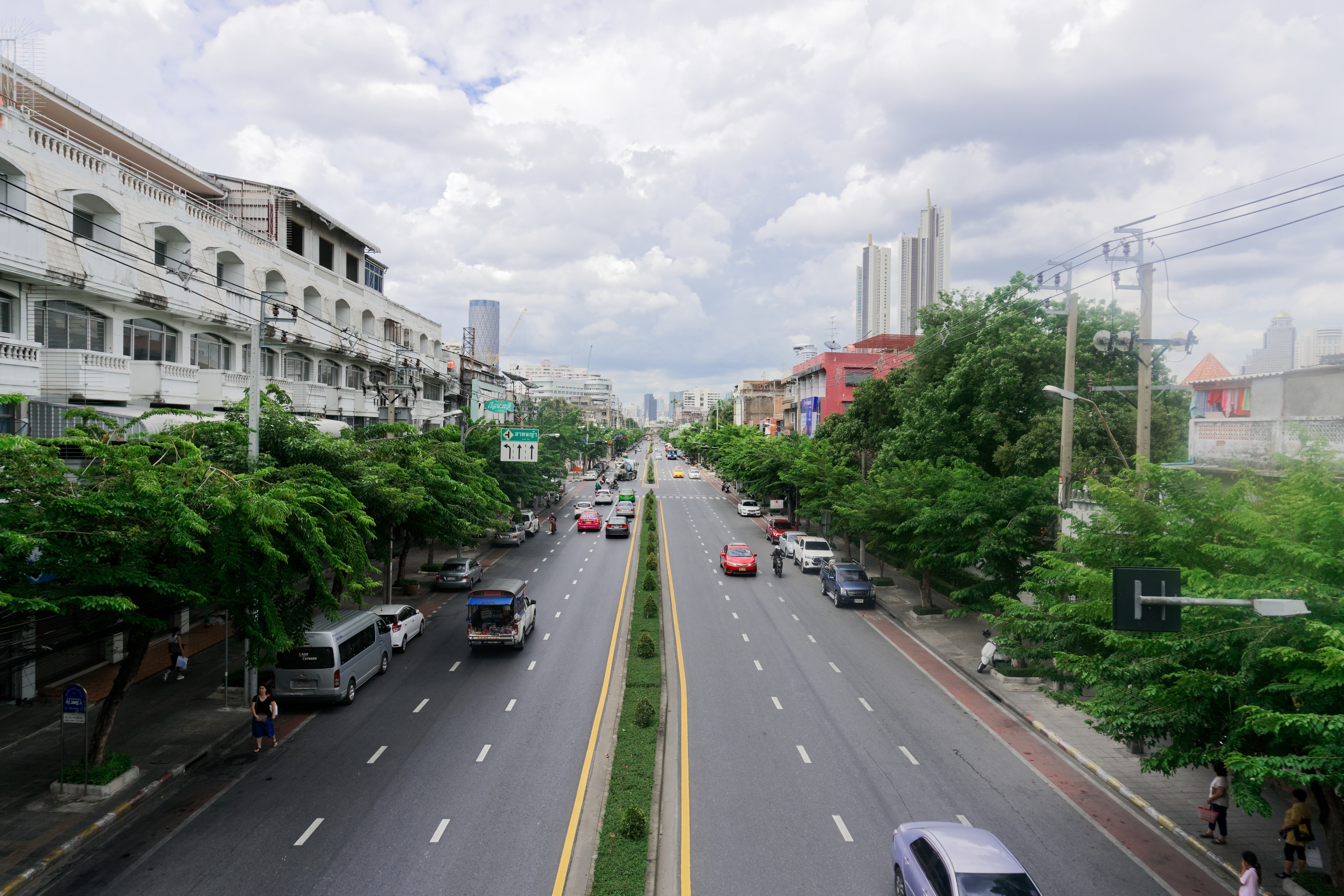
- Lat Ya Road at Lat Ya Junction, looking back toward Wongwian Yai
- Interactive map of Lat Ya Road
- Native name: ถนนลาดหญ้า
- Namesake: Thung Lat Ya (now Lat Ya Subdistrict, Mueang Kanchanaburi District, Kanchanaburi Province)
- Length: 1.6 km (0.99 mi)
- Location: Khlong San, Bangkok, Thailand
- Coordinates: 13°43′42″N 100°30′07″E
- Southwest end: Wongwian Yai
- Northeast end: Khlong San Junction

Lat Ya Road (Thai: ถนนลาดหญ้า, RTGS: Thanon Lat Ya, pronounced [tʰā.nǒn lâːt jâː]) is one of the major roads in Khlong San District, on the Thonburi side (the west bank of the Chao Phraya River) of Bangkok.

It was constructed in 1929 during the reign of King Rama VII as the fourth of eleven roads developed on the Thonburi side, in anticipation of the expansion of land transportation in the future. In 1932, marking the 150th anniversary of Rattanakosin (Bangkok), the Memorial Bridge was built across the Chao Phraya River to connect the Phra Nakhon (Bangkok core) and Thonburi sides.

The name "Lat Ya" is derived from the Battle of Thung Lat Ya (present-day Lat Ya Subdistrict, Mueang Kanchanaburi District, Kanchanaburi Province), where Siamese forces led by Prince Maha Sura Singhanat achieved victory over the Burmese army. This battle was part of the Nine Armies' War (1785–86) during the reign of King Rama I in the early Rattanakosin period. The road was laid through land that had originally been orchards, such as longkong groves. At first, it was merely a gravel road surfaced with crushed stone, and the roadside utility poles were simple electric poles.

At present, the road has six traffic lanes with a central median, a total width of 28 m (91.9 ft), and a length of 1,650 m (5,413.4 ft) It begins at Wongwian Yai, the site of the King Taksin the Great Monument, and runs northeast, passing the three-way Lat Ya Junction, where Itsaraphap Road and Tha Din Daeng Road begin, before continuing straight and terminating at Khlong San Junction, where it meets Charoen Nakhon Road and Somdet Chao Phraya Road, in front of Taksin Hospital and the Khlong San District Office.

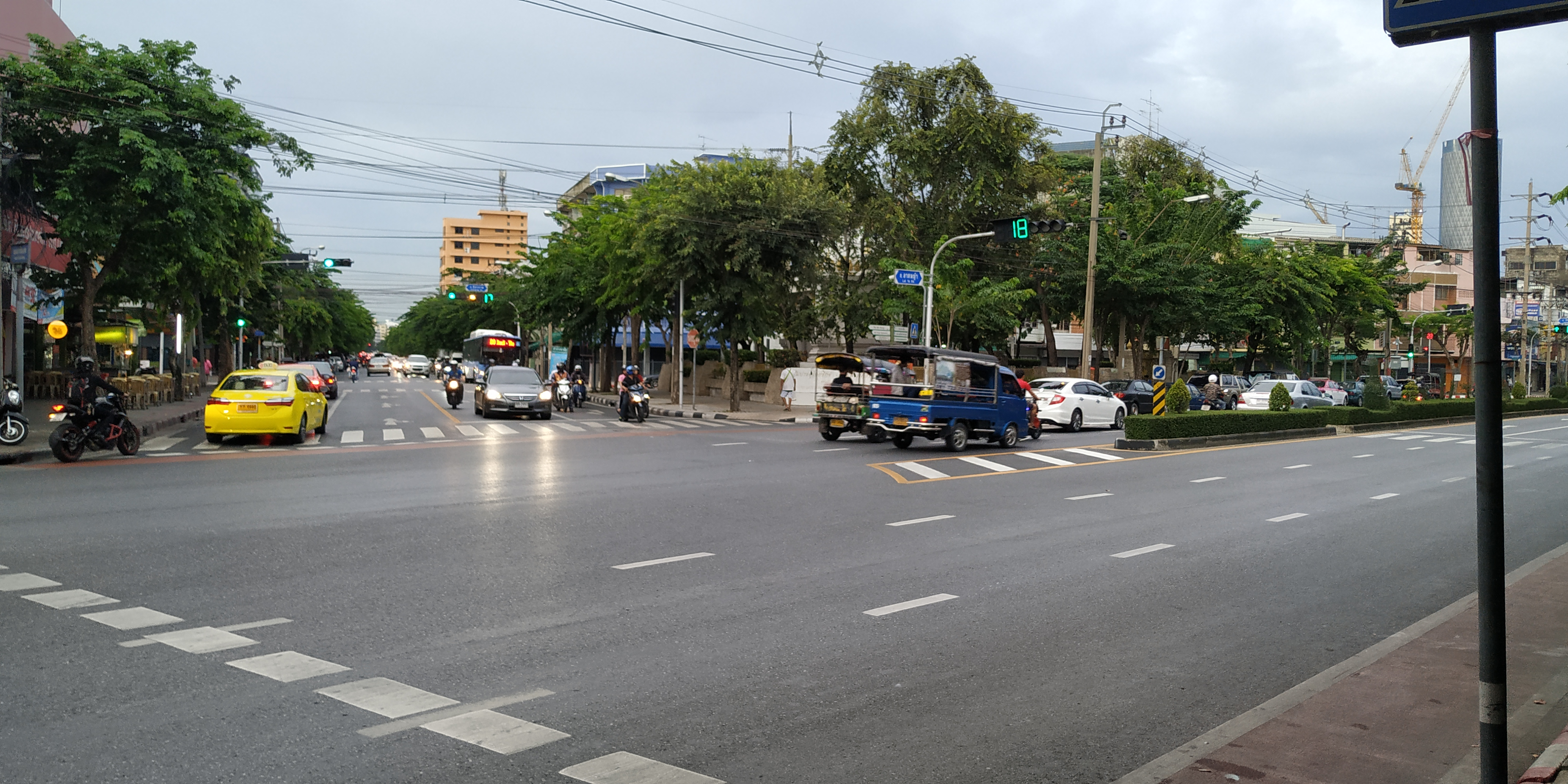
Lat Ya Road at the intersection with Itsaraphap Road and Tha Din Daeng Road (viewed from Lat Ya Road)

Lat Ya Road, particularly the stretch from Platform mall (formerly Robinson and Central Lat Ya) to Lat Ya Junction, is especially lively at night, lined with numerous street food vendors, notably chim chum eateries, many of which have been in operation for over 20–30 years. During the 1980s and 1990s, the area was also home to several suki restaurants, along with various dining spots and steakhouses. It was once the site of Thonburi Café, a large and well-known nightclub and restaurant in Bangkok during the heyday of such venues. In addition, around December 28 each year, the entire road is typically closed and turned into a pedestrian street for celebrations marking King Taksin the Great Day, with the festivities lasting about two to three days depending on the year.
