= Platform (shopping mall) =

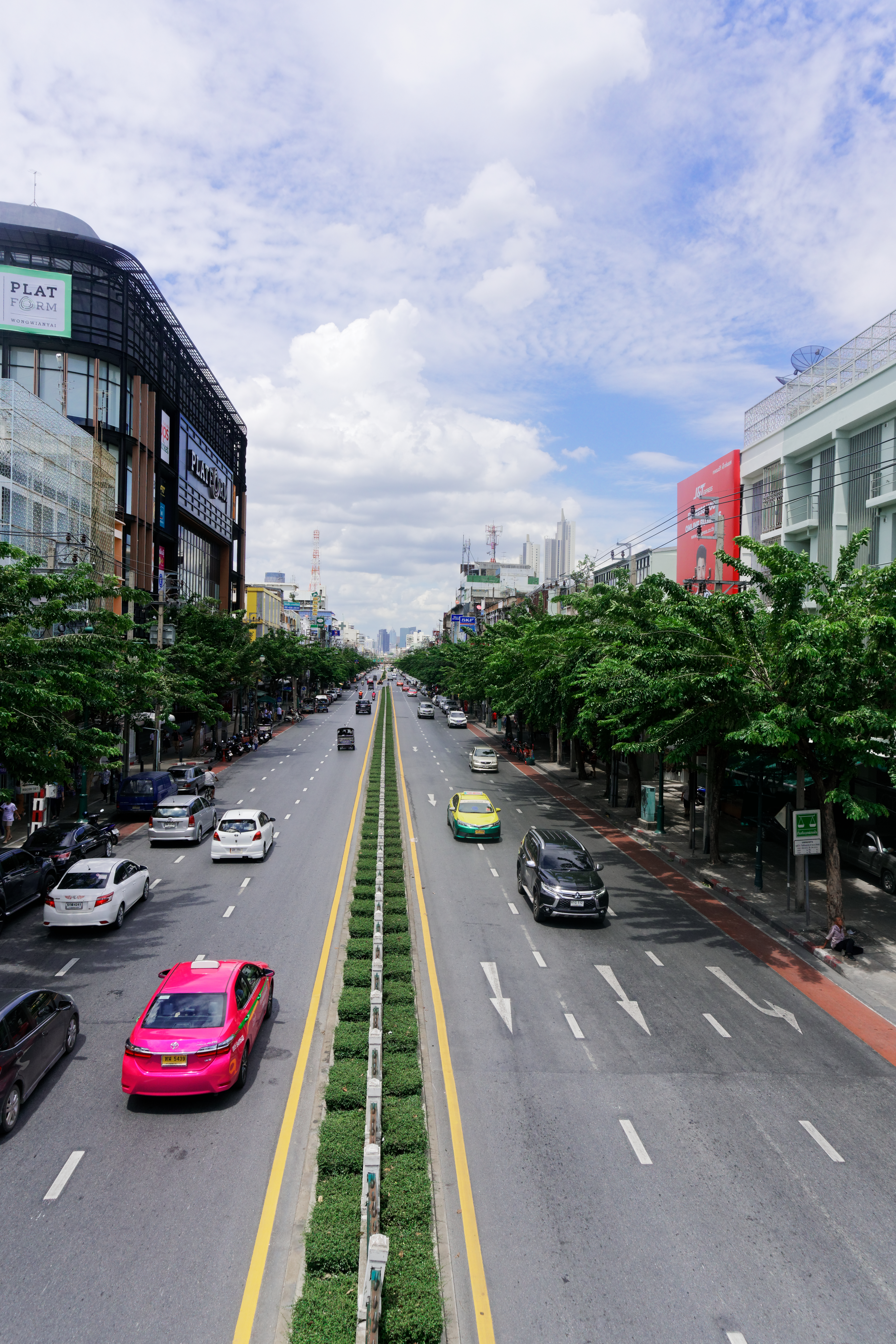
- Lat Ya Road heading toward the Khlong San District Office (Platform is on the left-hand side).
- Location: Khlong San, Bangkok
- Coordinates: 13.72702°N 100.49459°E
- Address: 99 Lat Ya Road, Somdet Chao Phraya
- Opened: 25 December 2016
- Developer: Central Group
- Manager: Lertvit Pumipitak
- Owner: Central Group
- Floor area: 27,820 m^{2}
- Floors: 7 (excluding the G floor)

Platform, also known as Platform Wongwian Yai (stylized as PLATF@RM) is a shopping mall in Bangkok, located on the northeastern corner of Wongwian Yai, on Lat Ya Road on the side heading toward the Khlong San District Office.

== History ==
Originally, it was Robinson Lat Ya, which was renovated from Central Lat Ya in 1997. During its time as Central Lat Ya, it was considered a leading department store in the Wongwian Yai area and had been in operation since 1981. As time passed over the decades, the Central Group later redeveloped it into "Platform" in a more modern concept to better meet the needs of contemporary consumers. The project had a budget of 250 million baht and spans an area of 27,820 square meters (300,000 sq ft), housing more than 100 retail outlets, including Dairy Queen, Tops Market, B2S, Fit by Supersports, Mr. DIY, Starbucks, Bar B Q Plaza, Pranakorn Boat Noodle, Café Amazon, Watsons, Beauty Buffet, and others. Its name refers to a railway platform, a meeting point and transportation hub for people in the Thonburi area. The logo is designed in the shape of Wongwian Yai, symbolizing a center of lifestyle for the Thonburi community.

== Facilities ==
The mall consists of seven floors.

The basement level (B) features a food court and beverage outlets. The first floor houses Tops Market, along with cafés and restaurants. The second floor is a shopping zone, while the third floor is dedicated to dining. The fourth floor (vacant since May 1, 2024). The fifth and sixth floors are home to tutorial schools and music institutes, and the seventh floor (use the stairs only) houses a fitness center.

== Transportation ==
Platform can be accessed by various public bus routes operated by the BMTA and private operators, such as routes 2-37 (3), 4-11 (43), 4-46 (84), 4-18 (105), 4-20 (111), and 4-53 (149). The mall is also accessible via the BTS Skytrain on Silom Line at Wongwian Yai station (exit 3), located to the south, as well as the nearby Wongwian Yai railway station on the Maeklong Railway line.

== See also ==
- List of shopping malls in Bangkok
