= Wat Kanlaya subdistrict =

Subdistrict in Bangkok, Thailand

Coordinates: 13°44′20.1″N 100°29′32.0″E

Wat Kanlaya วัดกัลยาณ์
- Khwaeng
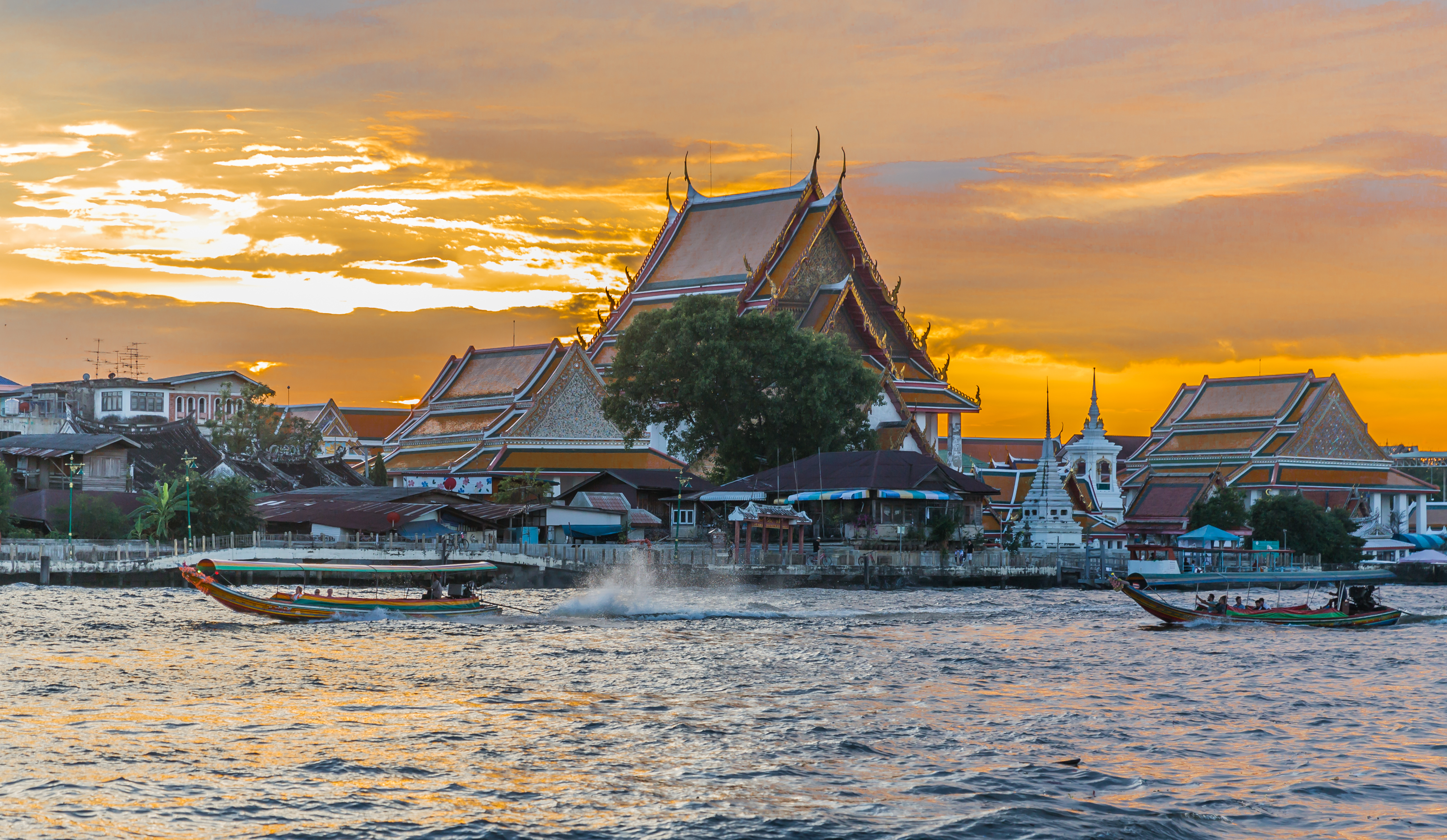
- The eponymous Wat Kanlayanamit, usually shortened to Wat Kanlaya.

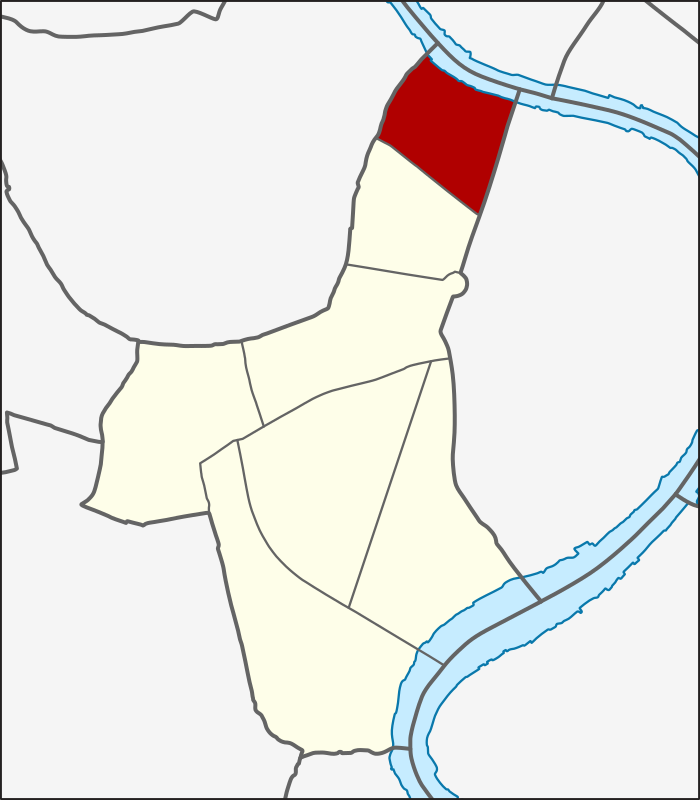
- Location in Thon Buri District
- Country: Thailand
- Province: Bangkok
- Khet: Thon Buri

Area
  - Total: 0.785 km^{2} (0.303 sq mi)

Population (2018)
  - Total: 9,307
  - Density: 11,391.08/km^{2} (29,502.8/sq mi)
- Time zone: UTC+7 (ICT)
- Postal code: 10600
- TIS 1099: 101501

Wat Kanlaya (Thai: วัดกัลยาณ์, pronounced [wát kān.lā.jāː]) is a khwaeng (sub-district) of Thon Buri District, Bangkok's Thonburi side, regarded as the northeast area of the district adjacent to the Chao Phraya River's west side.

== History and presently ==
Its name after Wat Kanlayanamit, a prominent local Thai Buddhist temple by the Chao Phraya River. The area is considered to be one of the most important areas in Bangkok's history. In the early Ayutthaya period before canalizing Chao Phraya River caused the canals Khlong Bangkok Yai and Khlong Bangkok Noi, this area was home to people on the wooden houseboats.

In the Thonburi period, people were evacuated from Ayutthaya to settle here following its fall in 1767. It's not just Siamese, but it also includes people of different races such as Vietnamese, Mon, Chinese, Portuguese and Muslims as well. The King Taksin granted a plot of land to all of them divided into proportions according to each religion, making this area a mix of people of various origins. In terms of religion, it consists of three religions and four sects, including Theravāda of Buddhism, Chinese Buddhism, Roman Catholicism, and Sunni Islam. Therefore resulting in many outstanding places of worship in the area also neighboring until the present viz Wat Kanlayanamit, Wat Prayoonwongsawat, Santa Cruz Church, Bang Luang Mosque, Kuan An Keng Shrine, Wat Buppharam Worawihan.

Today, the sub-district is also divided into six communities: Kudi Chin, Kudi Khao, Wat Buppharam, Wat Prayoonwong, Wat Kanlaya, and Rong Kram.

The main artery of area, Kudi Chin is a residence of Thai-Portuguese-Chinese, dates back to Thonburi period around 250 years ago. At present, it is known as a place of cultural tourism.

== Geography ==
Wat Kanlaya has an area of 0.785 km^{2} (about 0.303 mi^{2}).

Places neighboring this sub-district include (from the north clockwise): Chao Phraya River, Prajadhipok Road, Itsaraphap Road, and Khlong Bangkok Yai.

== Population ==
In 2018 it had a total population of 9,307 people (4,463 men, 4,847 women).

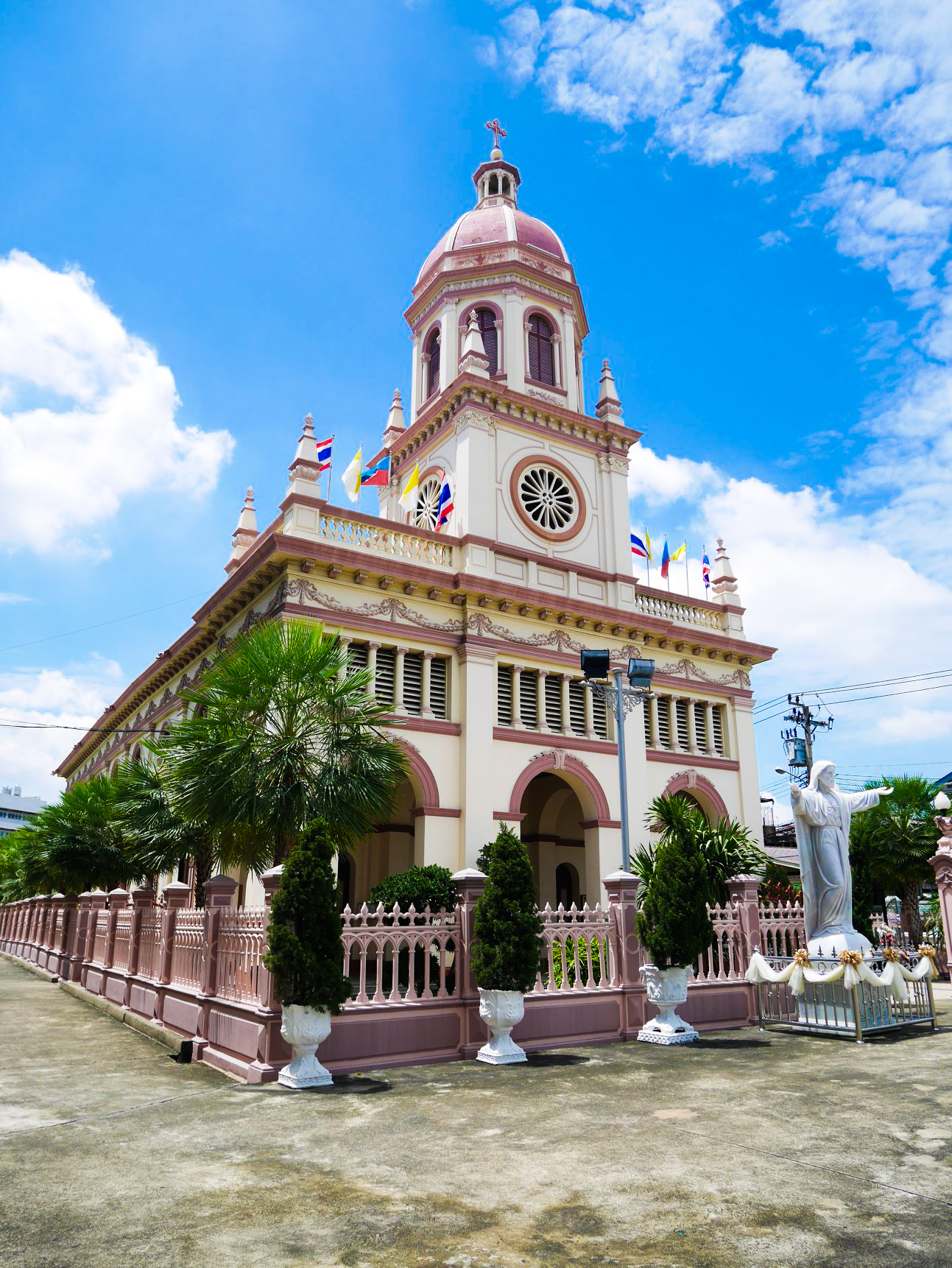
Santa Cruz Church, one of landmarks of the sub-district

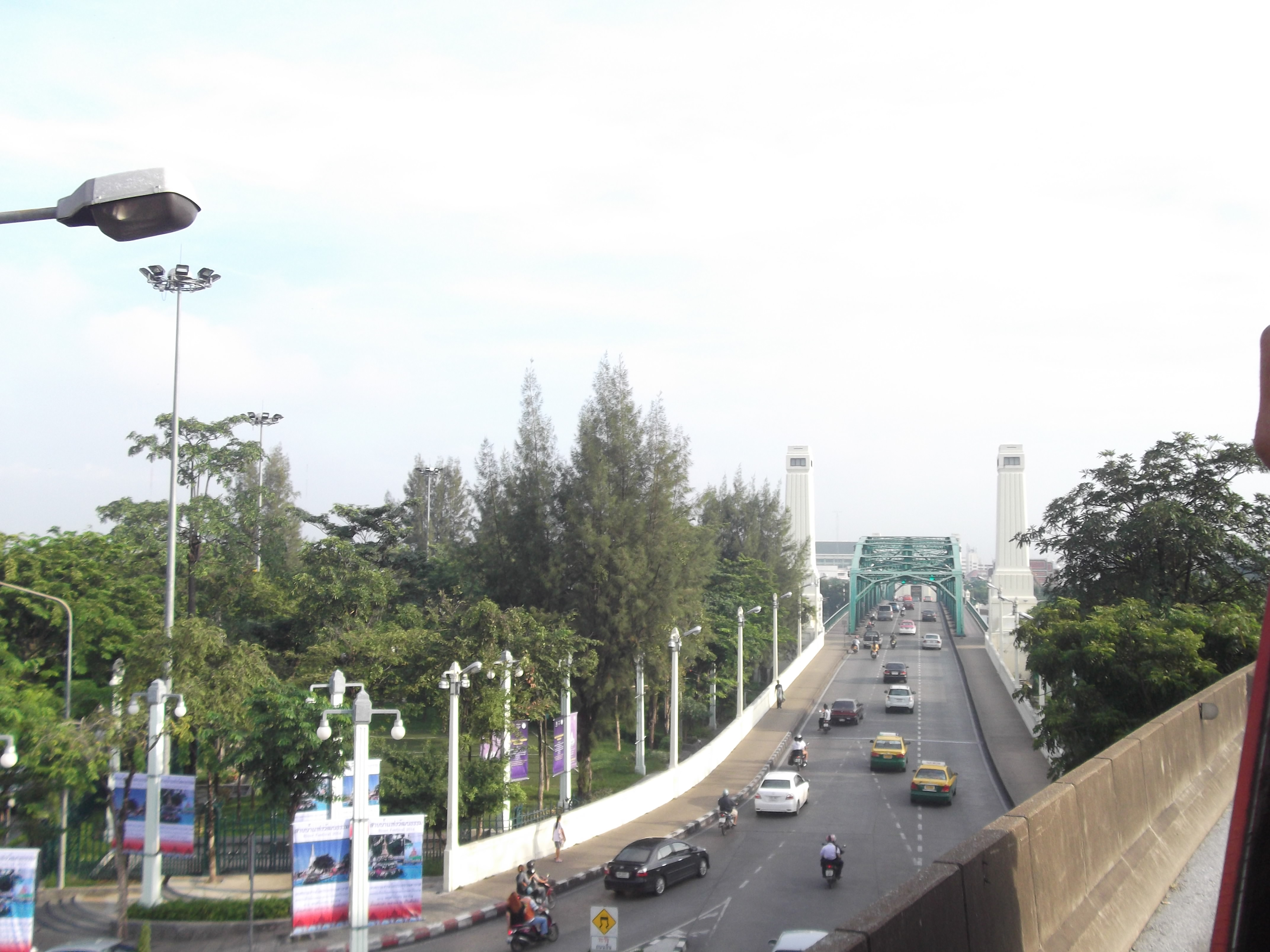
Foot of Memorial Bridge in Wat Kanlaya side (view from Phra Pok Klao Bridge)

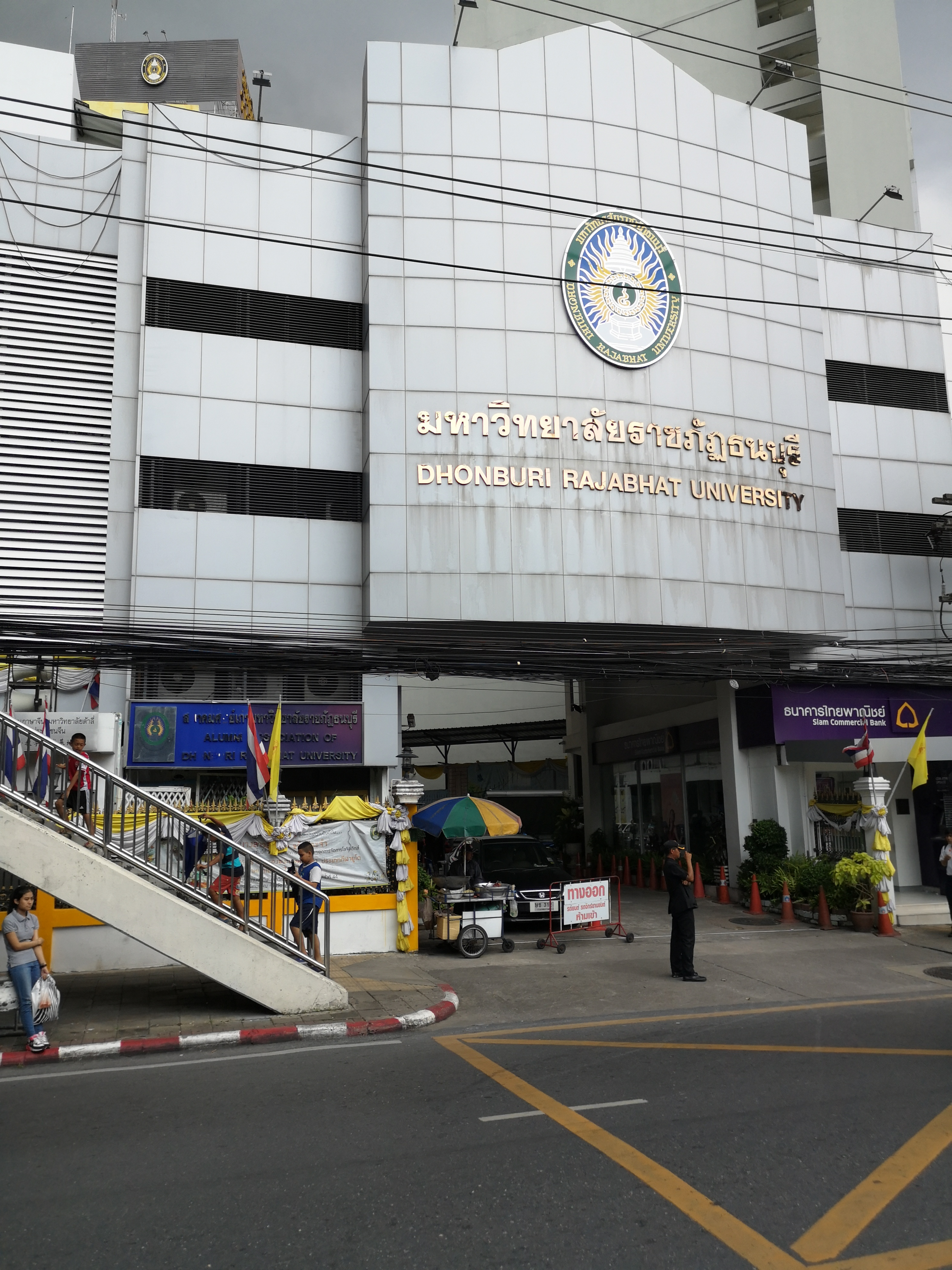
Itsaraphap Road in the front of Dhonburi Rajabhat University

== Places ==
=== Temples ===
- Wat Kanlayanamit
- Wat Prayoonwongsawat
- Santa Cruz Church
- Bang Luang Mosque
- Kuan An Keng Shrine
- Wat Buppharam Worawihan

=== Important places ===
- Kudi Chin Community
- Windsor House
- Phatthayakosol House
- Khlong Somdet Chao Phraya
- Khlong Kudi Chin
- City Law Enforcement Department Headquarters
- Buppharam Metropolitan Police Station
- Big C Supercenter Itsaraphap

=== Educational institutions ===
The sub-district consists of 11 educational institutions

- Dhonburi Rajabhat University
- Suksanari School
- Wat Kanlayanamit School
- Wat Prayoonwongsawat School
- Santa Cruz Convent School
- Santa Cruz Suksa School
- Sangaroonthonburi Kindergarten & Nursery
- Santa Cruz Kindergarten

=== Transport ===
- Prajadhipok Road
- Itsaraphap Road
- Arun Amarin Road
- Memorial Bridge (Phut Bridge)
- Phra Pok Klao Bridge
- Thetsaban Sai 1 Road
- Thetsaban Sai 2 Road
