= Suksanari School =

Coordinates: 13.7349°N 100.4953°E

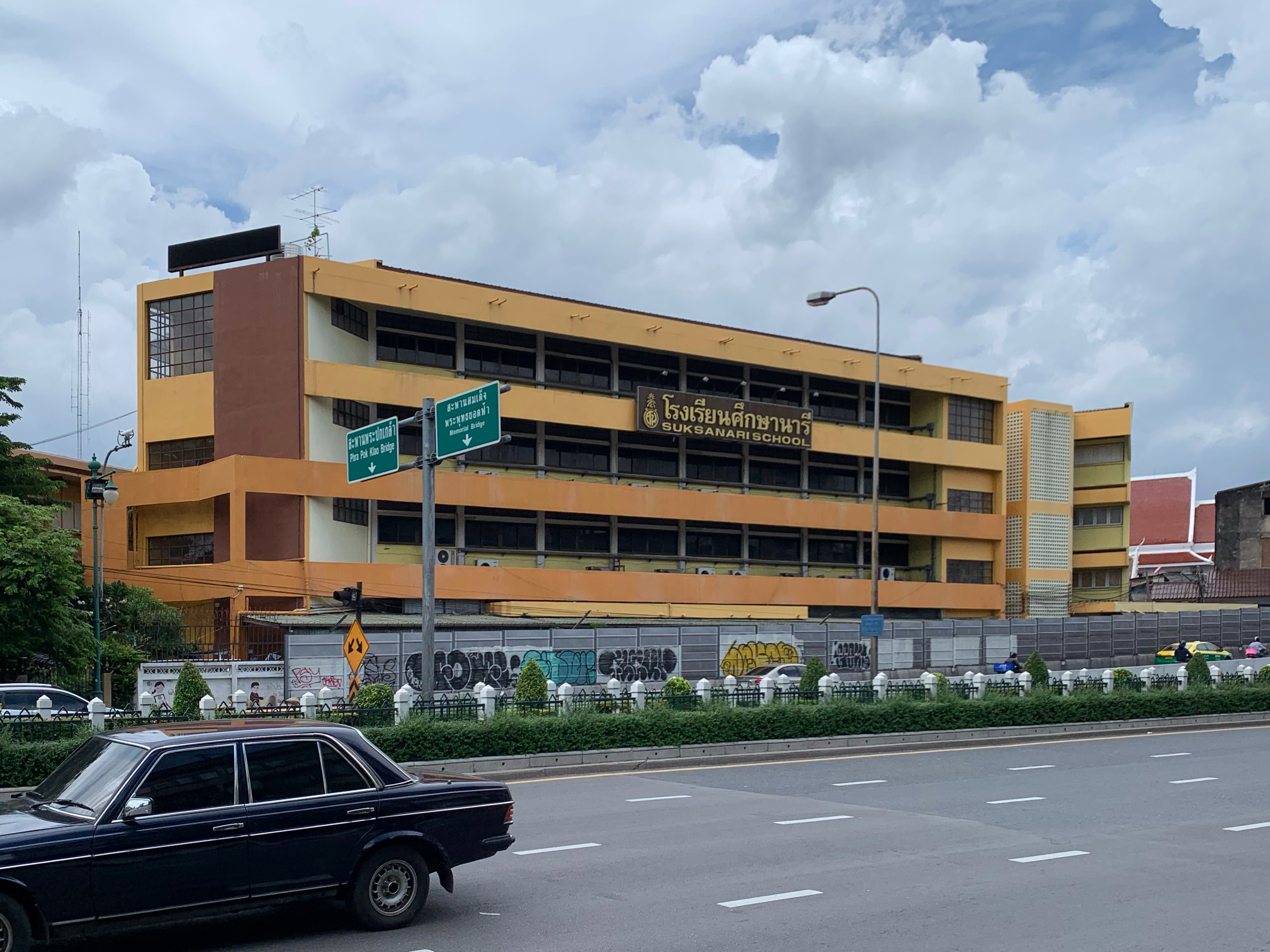

Information
- School type: Public School
- Established: 25 June 1910
- Director: Mr. Khajitpan Suwansiriphak
- Colour: Brown-Yellow
- Website: www.snr.ac.th

Suksanari School (S.N.R.) is a public school for girls located in Bangkok, Thailand. The school was founded by Somdet Phutthachan (Nuam Phutthasaramahathera), the abbot of Anongkharam Temple, on 25 June 1910. The school provides general education for students from grades 7 through 12.

== History ==
Suksanari School is a school that provides education in both lower secondary school and high school education. The school is a part of the Thai government education system. The founder, Somdejputthajarn (Nuam Putthasaramahatera), opened the school inside Anongkaram Temple in order to provide education for females, who had historically had not been emphasized in the Thai education system. Therefore, he opened the school and employed Mr. Toop to be a teacher.

== Location ==
Suksanari School is located at 176 Prajadhipok Road, Wat Kanlaya, Thonburi, Bangkok 10600

== Important people ==
- Somdet Putthajarn (Nuam Putthasaramahatera), founder of the school.
- Chao Phraya Borom Maha Si Suriyawongse (Choung Bunnak), landowner.
- Srinagarindra Barommarachachonnanee, Alumni of the school.

== Curriculum ==
The school provides education from grades 7 through 12. Each level has 12 rooms.

- Lower Secondary School
- Upper Secondary School (High School)

In this level, students must choose one of the following programs of study.

program
Sci – Math
Eng – Math
Chinese – Eng
Japanese – Eng
French – Eng
Korean – Eng
