= Santa Cruz Church, Bangkok =

Church in Bangkok, Thailand

Coordinates: 13°44′20″N 100°29′38″E

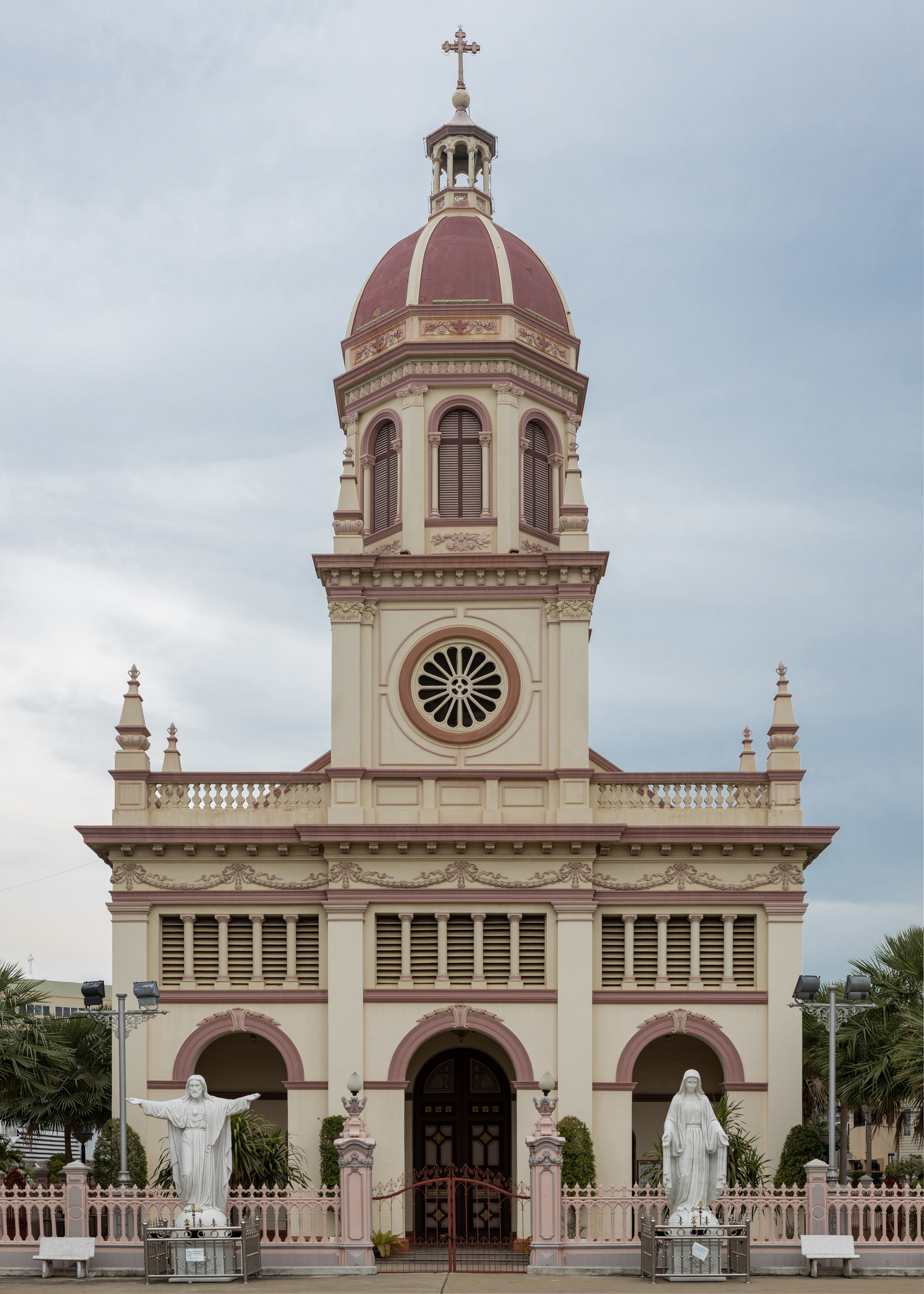
Santa Cruz Church

Santa Cruz Church (Portuguese for 'Holy Cross Church'; Thai: วัดซางตาครู้ส, pronounced [wát sāːŋ.tāː kʰrúːt, -kʰrúːs]), also known as Kudi Chin (กุฎีจีน, [kūdīː t͡ɕīːn]), is a Roman Catholic church in Bangkok. It is in Khwaeng (sub-district) Wat Kanlaya of the Thon Buri District on the west bank of Chao Phraya River, in the neighbourhood known as Kudi Chin. A church was first built on the site, which had been granted to a community of Portuguese Catholics, around 1770. It was then the main Catholic church in Bangkok, and served as the seat of the Apostolic Vicariate of Siam until 1821, when Assumption Cathedral was completed. The current building, in Renaissance Revival style, was built in 1913–1916 to replace a second structure from 1845.
