= Somdet Chao Phraya subdistrict =

Sub-district of Bangkok, Thailand

Coordinates: 13°43′56.41″N 100°29′43.55″E

Somdet Chao Phraya สมเด็จเจ้าพระยา
- Khwaeng
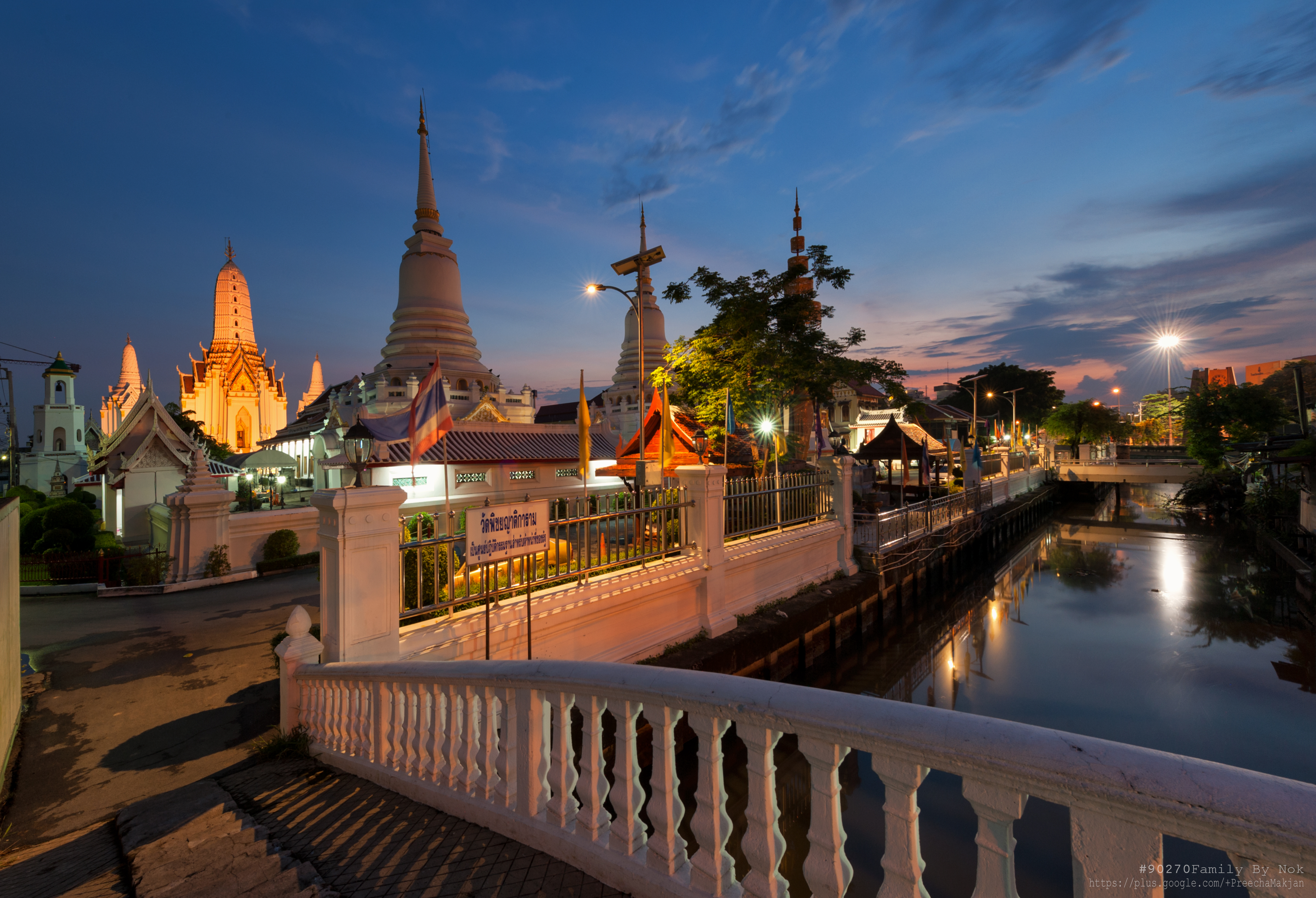
- A pedestrian bridge over Khlong Somdet Chao Phraya and leads to Wat Phichai Yat, a prominent temple in this subdistrict.

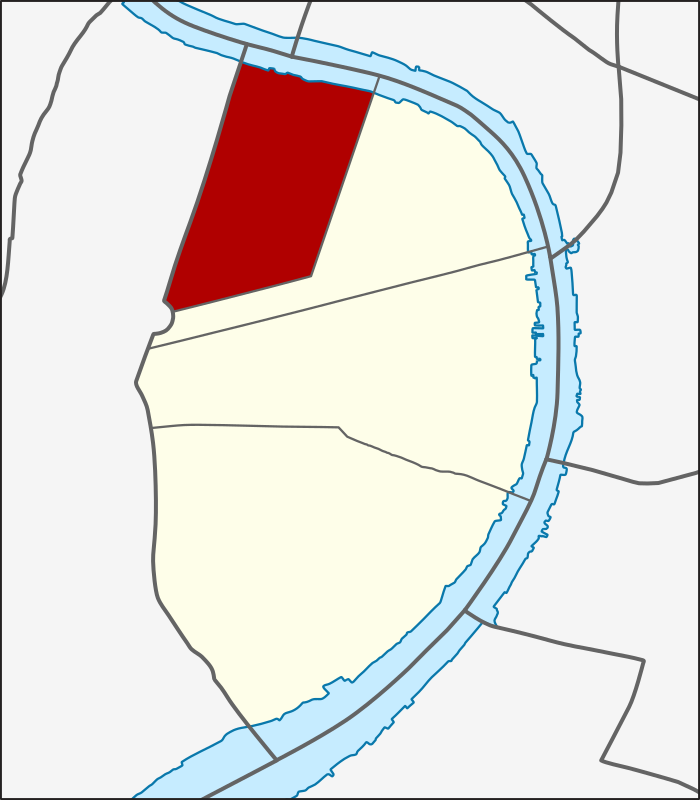
- Location in Khlong San District
- Country: Thailand
- Province: Bangkok
- Khet: Khlong San

Area
  - Total: 1.317 km^{2} (0.508 sq mi)

Population (2020)
  - Total: 12,373
- Time zone: UTC+7 (ICT)
- Postal code: 10600
- TIS 1099: 101801

Somdet Chao Phraya (Thai: สมเด็จเจ้าพระยา, pronounced [sǒm.dèt t͡ɕâːw pʰrā.jāː]) is one of the four khwaengs (subdistrict) of Khlong San district, Bangkok's Thonburi side (west bank of Chao Phraya river).

== History ==
The subdistrict is named after Khlong Somdet Chao Phraya, a khlong (canal) that runs through the area to the west and ends at the Khlong Bang Sai Kai in the neighbouring district Thon Buri. It has a total length of 2.5 km (1.6 mi), a width of 4–11 m (13–36 ft) and an average depth of 0.6 m (2 ft 0 in). Currently, it is only a small waterway.

The name "Somdet Chao Phraya" is a Thai noble title, derived from the canal's excavation during the reign of King Mongkut (Rama IV) by the nobility of this rank in the Bunnag family as well as being their residence. Not only this khlong, but also other khlongs in the Khlong San neighbourhood most of them were excavated by members of the Bunnag family, such as Somdet Chao Phraya Borom Maha Prayurawongse, Somdet Chao Phraya Borom Maha Phichai Yat, and Somdet Chao Phraya Sri Suriwongse. They are also the renovators of many wats (temple) in the area, for example Wat Phichai Yat, Wat Anongkharam etc.

In those days, Khlong Somdet Chao Phraya also has another name, "Khlong Khanon Maenam", which means customs house river canal. Because it was the location of the customs house and also the site of the royal warehouse, with Talat Ban Somdet, the local market that was the source of imported products from foreign countries as well.

This area has been a community and market that has been a mixture of people of various races and religions for over 200 years since the early Rattanakosin era. In 1954, Talat Ban Somdet caught fire.

== Geography ==
Somdet Chao Phraya has an area of 1.16 km^{2} (0.45 sq mi), regarded as the northernmost of the district.

Neighbouring subdistricts are (from the north clockwise): Wang Burapha Phirom in Phra Nakhon district, Chakkrawat in Samphanthawong district (across Chao Phraya river), Khlong San and Khlong Ton Sai in its district, Hiran Ruchi and Wat Kanlaya in Thon Buri district.

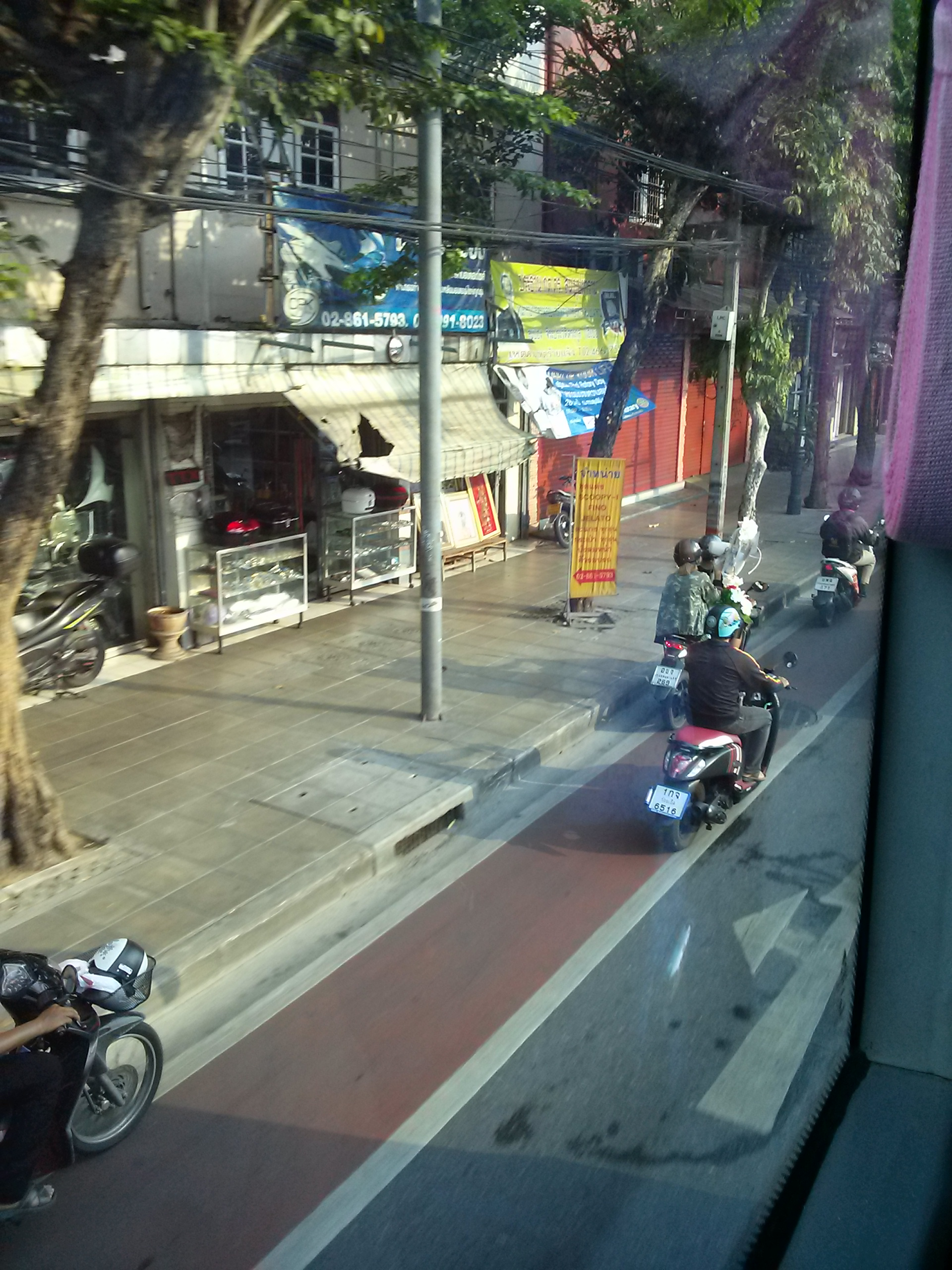
Somdet Chao Phraya road in the Somdet Chao Phraya area.

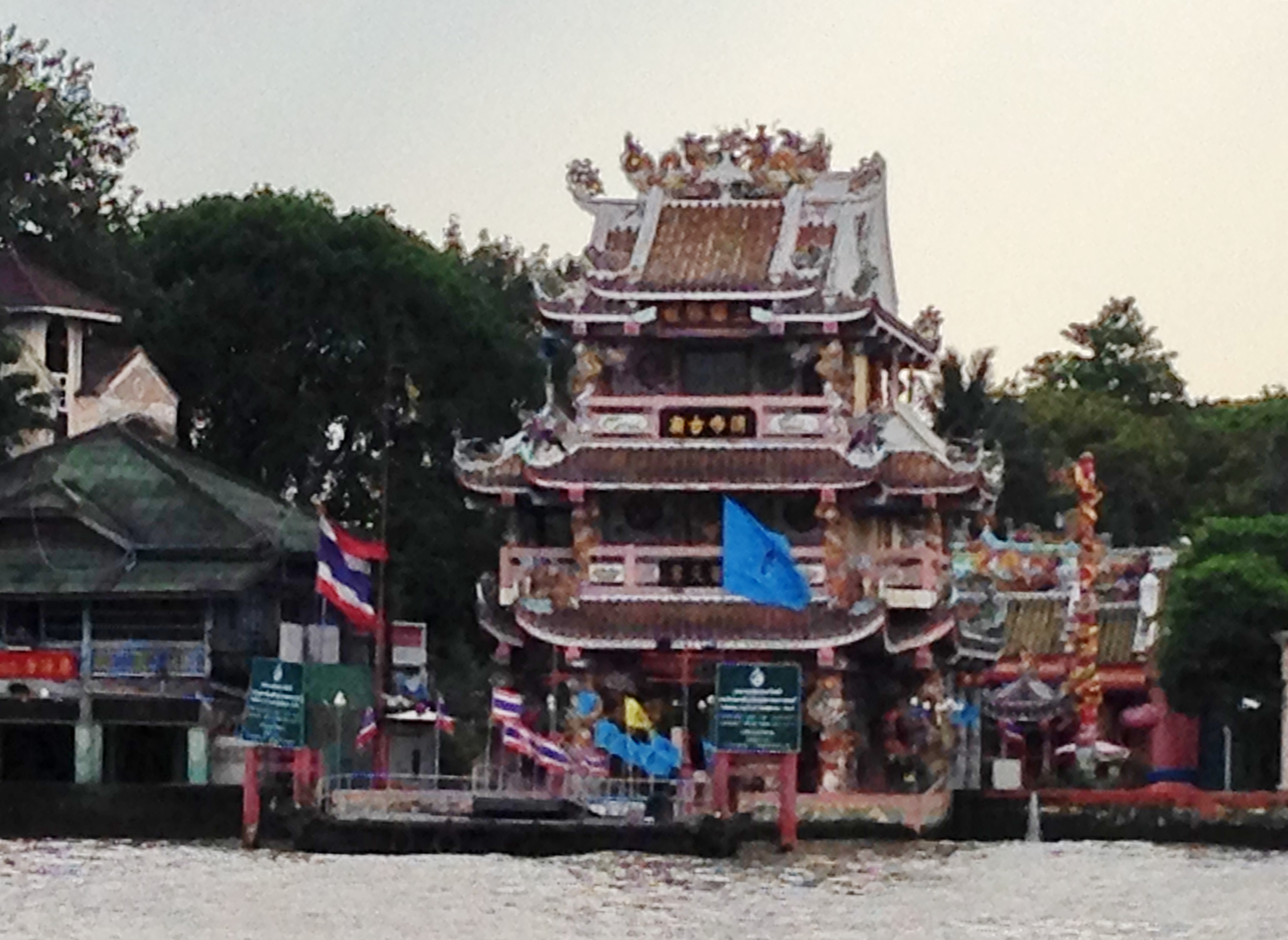
Guan Yu Shrine and Thang Nguan Hah Vintage House (left).

Prajadhipok, Issaraphap, and Somdet Chao Phraya roads are three main routes in the area.

== Places ==
- Wat Anongkharam
- Wat Phichai Yat
- Masjid Saifee (Surao Tuek Kao)
- Masjid Goowatin Islam (Surao Tuek Daeng)
- Princess Mother Memorial Park
- Guan Yu Shrine
- Thang Nguan Hah Vintage House
- San Chao Pho Suea (Xuanwu Shrine)
- Lamthong Salt Warehouse
- Tha Din Daeng and Tha Din Daeng Pier
- Nan-Ah Polyclinic
- Phayamai Amulet Market
