= Wat Anongkharam =

Buddhist temple in Bangkok, Thailand

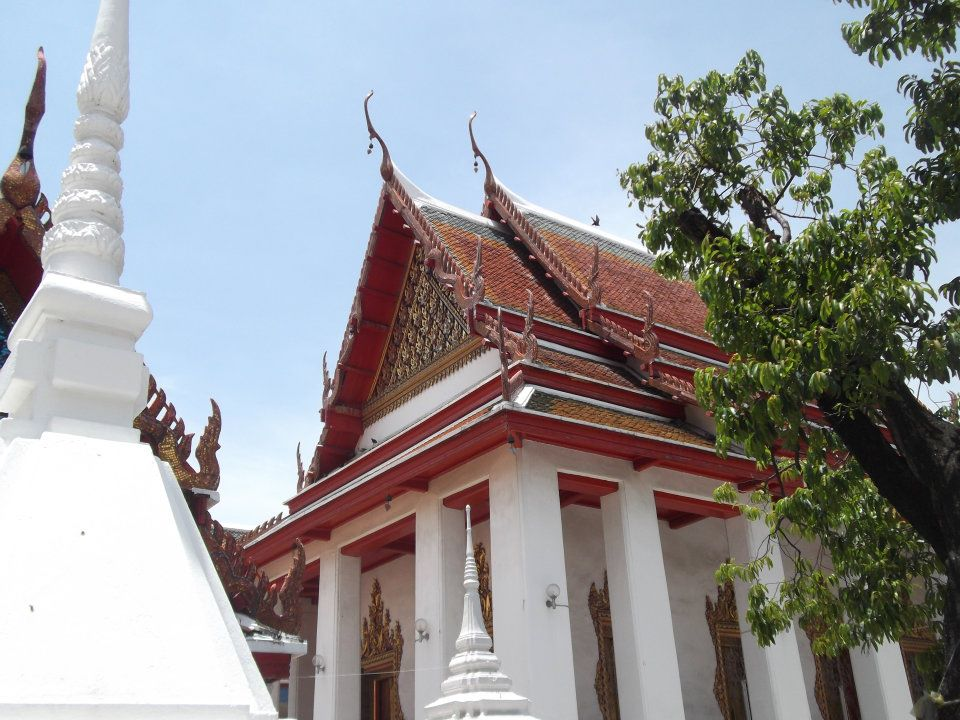

- Location within Bangkok

Religion
- Affiliation: Buddhism (Theravada: Maha Nikaya)
- Sect: Theravāda

Location
- Location: 41 Somdet Chao Phraya Rd., Somdet Chao Phraya, Khlong San, Bangkok
- Country: Thailand
- Interactive map of Wat Anongkharam
- Coordinates: 13.734346°N 100.497897°E

Architecture
- Founder: Dame Noi
- Completed: 1850

Wat Anongkharam Worawihan (Thai: วัดอนงคารามวรวิหาร) is a second grade royal temple of Worawihan. It was built in 1850 in dedication for King Rama III. The formerly named was Wat Noi Khamthaem (วัดน้อยขำแถม) after its founder Dame Noi, wife of a noble, Somdet Chao Phraya Borom Maha Phichai Yat (That Bunnag), the temple was built along with neighbouring Wat Phichai Yat. It was later renamed Wat Anongkharam ("temple of lady") by King Rama IV.

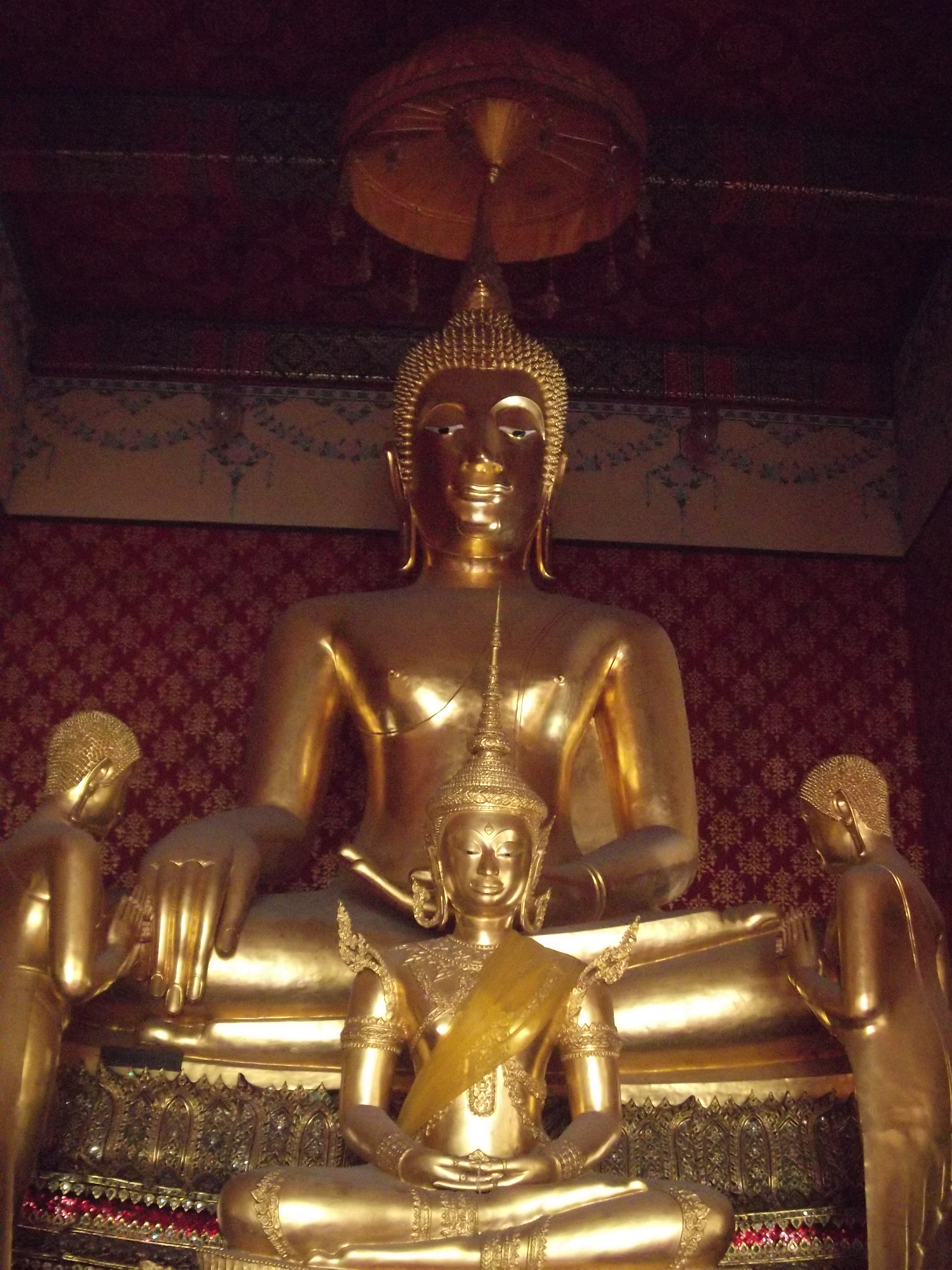
Phra Chunlanak

The sanctuary built in Thai-styled Rama I period, inside there is a principal Buddha image with gold-leaf covered bronze in Māravijaya attitude of Sukhothai styled named Phra Chunlanak (พระจุลนาค) which has been brought from Sukhothai province since 1949. Cluster of the monk's dwellings are decorated with beautiful wooden works. Besides, there are plenty of important Buddha image in the temple compound and the collections of revered monk Somdet Phra Phutthachan Phutthamahathera (Nuam)'s daily-used belongings in a monk's dwelling which will be open for public visit and homage-paying on Buddhist Lent Day and New Year Day.

Within the temple grounds is also home to a Bangkok Local Museum, Khlong San District.

The temple was registered as a national historic monument by the Fine Arts Department in 1977.

In addition, the community around the temple is also considered to be ancient and of historical value. In the past, it used to be the site of warehouses and factories owned by Chinese and Indians that manufactured various types of product such as leather, salt, sugar, fish sauce, and coal. It is also a diverse community made up of people from different beliefs and cultures, which is way Buddhist temples, Chinese joss houses, and masjids are all located together in the same quarter. Nowadays, most of those businesses have relocated or closed permanently. However, shophouse, antique arched entrance, monasteries, and charming single-story wooden houses still remain in this neighbourhood. It is also a childhood home of Princess Srinagarindra, mother of King Rama VIII and King Rama IX, also a Princess Mother Memorial Park dedicated to her is located nearby.

In addition to a Princess Mother Memorial Park, a group of interesting buildings, like the ancient Guan Yu Shrine, Thang Nguan Hah Heritage House, a fish sauce factory in a 200-year-old Chinese courtyard house, and a charming hipped wooden house by the Chao Phraya River.
