= Khlong San subdistrict =

Coordinates: 13°43′50.2″N 100°30′33.1″E

Khlong San คลองสาน
- Khwaeng
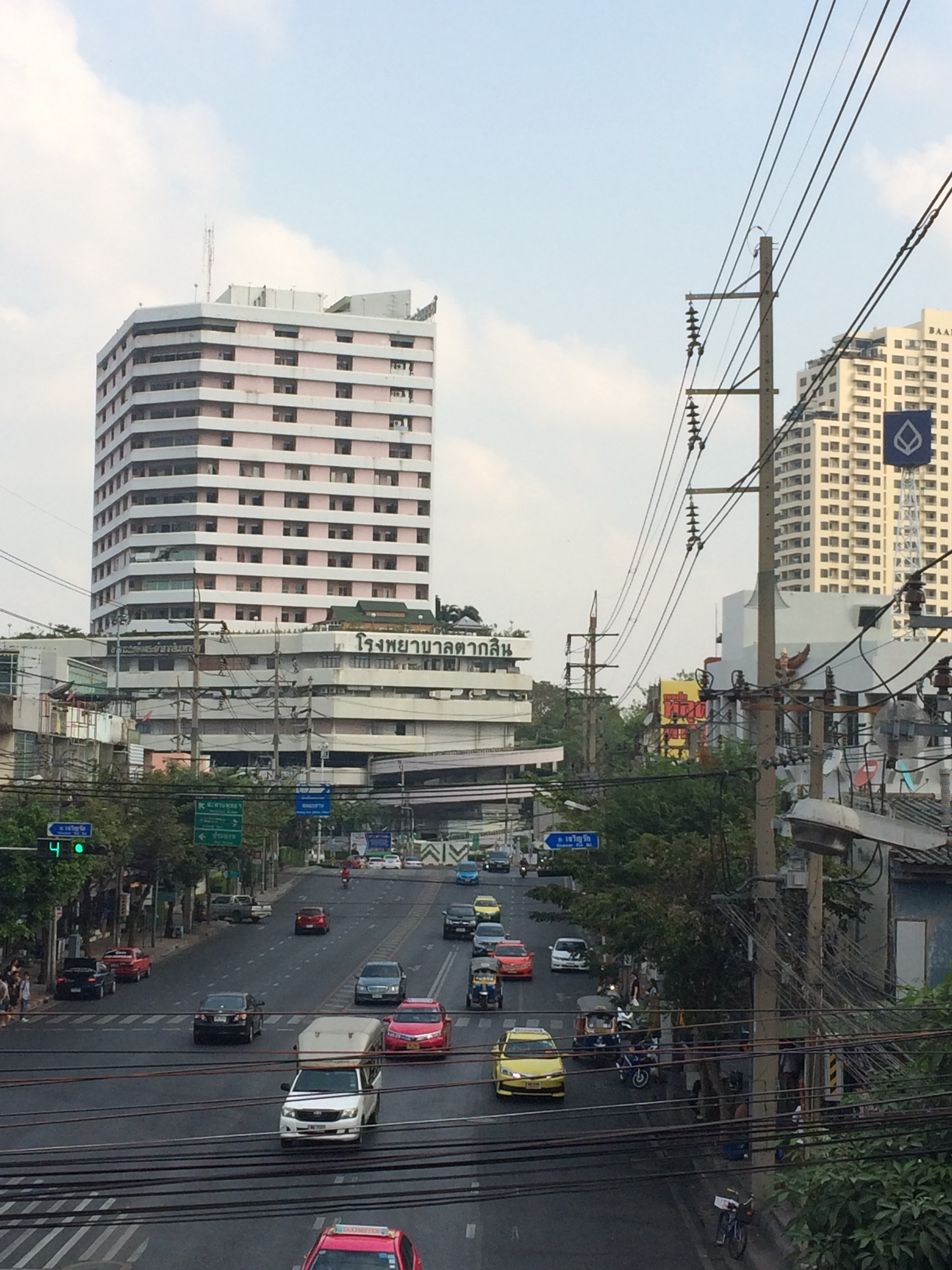
- Charoen Nakhon Road near Taksin Hospital and Charoen Nakhon junction.

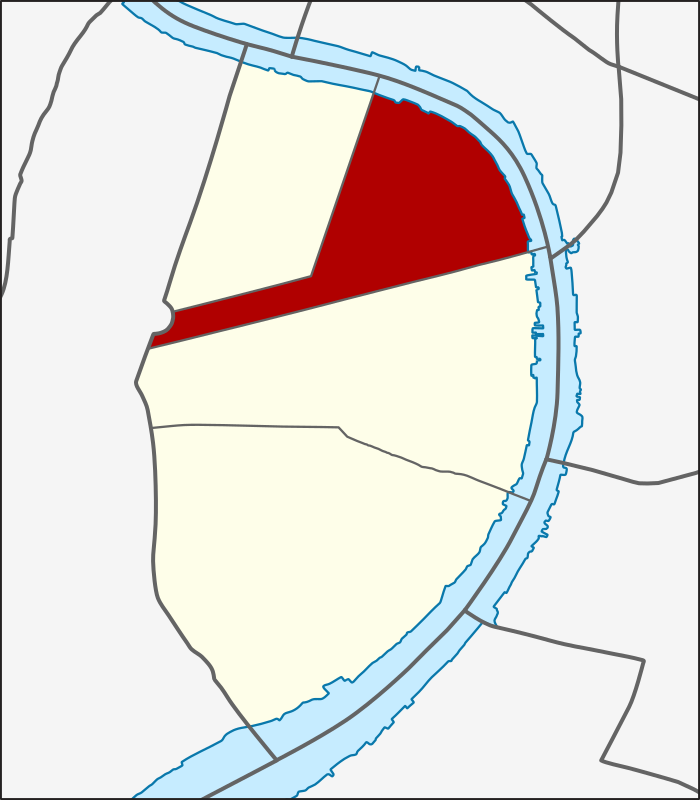
- Location in Khlong San District
- Country: Thailand
- Province: Bangkok
- Khet: Khlong San

Area
  - Total: 0.727 km^{2} (0.281 sq mi)

Population (2020)
  - Total: 14,549
- Time zone: UTC+7 (ICT)
- Postal code: 10600
- TIS 1099: 101802

Khlong San (Thai: คลองสาน, pronounced [kʰlɔ̄ːŋ sǎːn]) is a khwaeng (subdistrict) of Khlong San District on Bangkok's Thonburi side. It is the location of the district office.

== History ==
The district is named after Khlong San, a natural khlong ('canal').

This area was once home to many of the Bunnag nobles. It also served as a stop for overseas cargo ships before Bangkok Port was built.

Originally, Khlong San District was called Bang Lamphu Lang until 1916, during the reign of King Vajiravudh (Rama VI), when it became part of Thonburi Province. Its status was changed to king amphoe (minor district) in 1938, then upgraded back to amphoe (full district) in 1957 due to population changes. It became part of Bangkok after the merger of Thonburi and Phra Nakhon Provinces in 1971.

The intersection of Charoen Nakhon and Charoen Rat Roads (Chanroen Rat junction) was formerly the site of Pak Khlong San railway station, the terminus of the Maeklong railway line since 1904. In 1961, as Bangkok expanded, the government demolished the station and tracks to create Charoen Rat Road.

== Geography ==
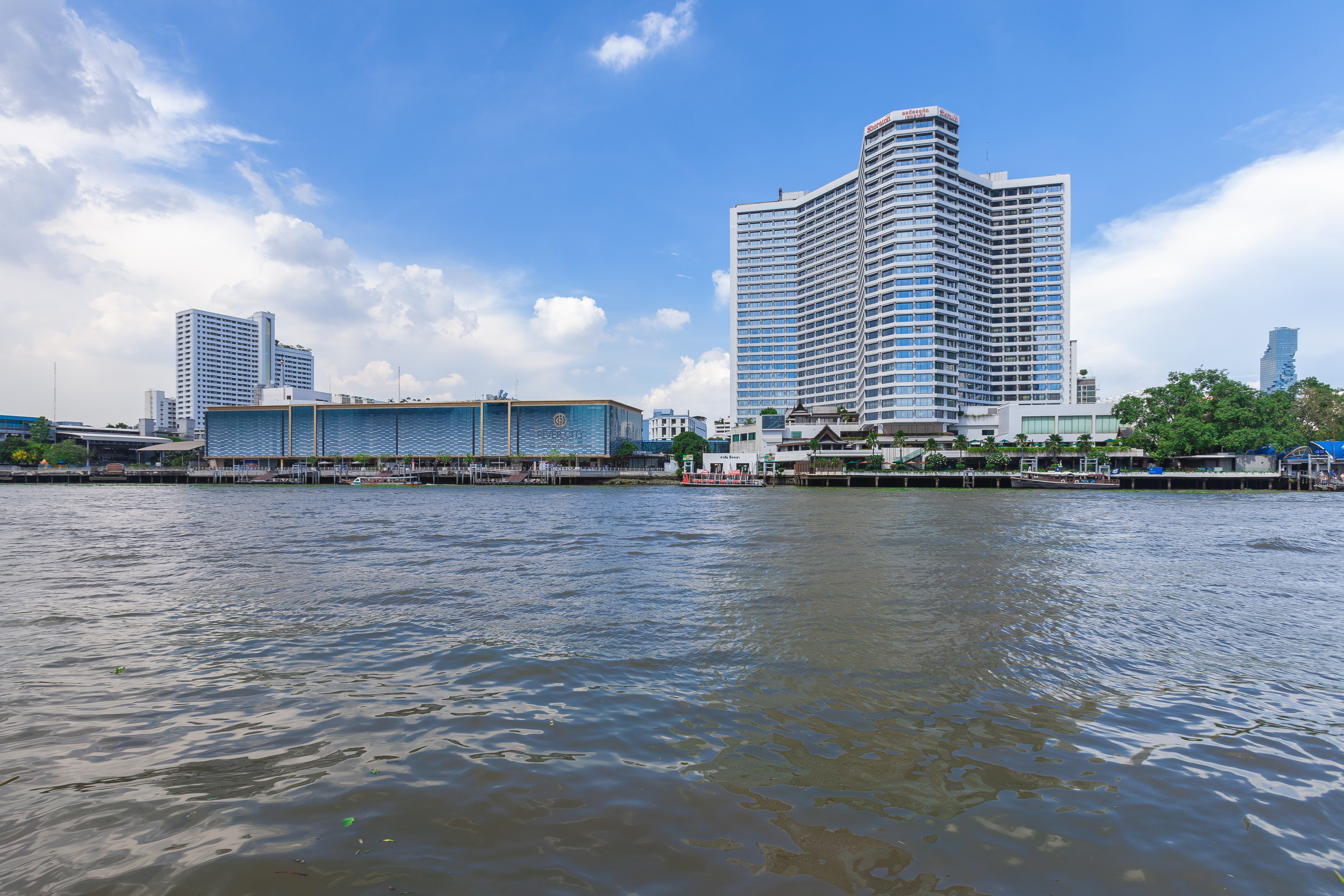
From left: River City Shopping Complex, Si Phraya Pier, and Royal Orchid Sheraton Hotel seen from Khlong San Pier in Khlong San.

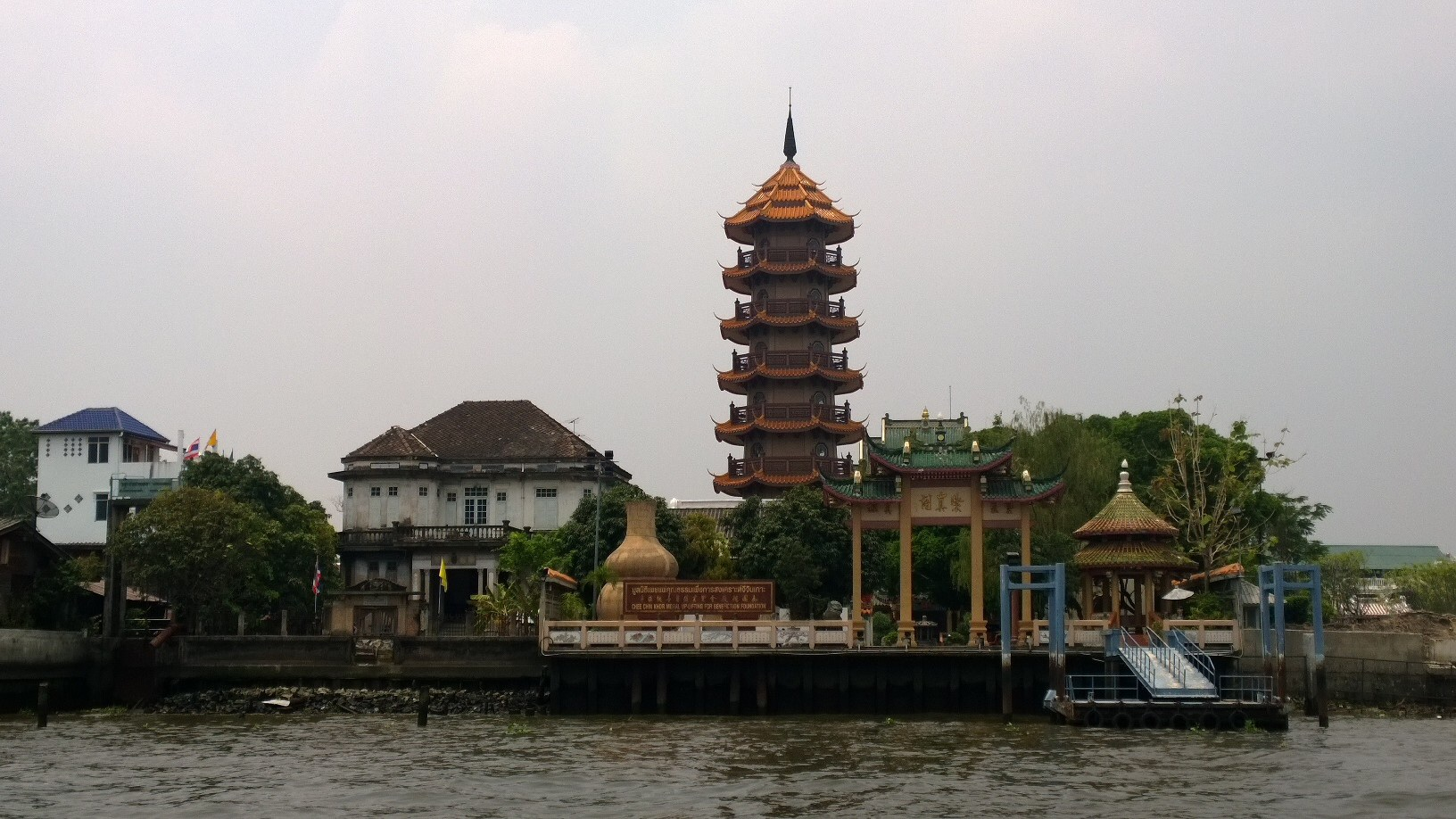
Pagoda of Chee Chin Khor Moral Uplifting Societies.

Khlong San has an area of 6.87 km^{2} (2.65 mi^{2}), regarded as the middle part of the district.

Neighbouring subdistricts are (from the north clockwise): Somdet Chao Phraya in its district, Chakkrawat, and Talat Noi of Samphanthawong District (across the Chao Phraya River), Khlong Ton Sai in its district, and Hiran Ruchi of Thon Buri District.

== Places ==
- Wanglee House, Lhong 1919, and Mazu Shrine
- ICONSIAM
- Somdet Chaopraya Institute of Psychiatry
