= Chao Phraya River Pedestrian Bridge =

Chao Phraya River Pedestrian Bridge สะพานคนเดินข้ามแม่น้ำเจ้าพระยา
- Crosses: Chao Phraya River
- Locale: Samphanthawong District & Khlong San District
- Owner: Bangkok Metropolitan Administration

The Chao Phraya River Pedestrian Bridge (Thai: สะพานคนเดินข้ามแม่น้ำเจ้าพระยา) is a planned pedestrian bridge spanning the Chao Phraya River connecting Samphanthawong and Khlong San districts.

The bridge design was announced by the Bangkok Metropolitan Administration on 9 January 2026.

== History ==
The bridge is in the preliminary design and study phase, and is awaiting an environmental impact assessment. The initial renderings were designed by architecture firm MVRDV.

== Location ==
The bridge is planned to span the Chao Phraya River between Song Wat road in Samphanthawong district with the Wat Thong Thammachat Worawihan area in Khlong San district.
