= Wat Phichai Yat =

Buddhist temple in Bangkok, Thailand

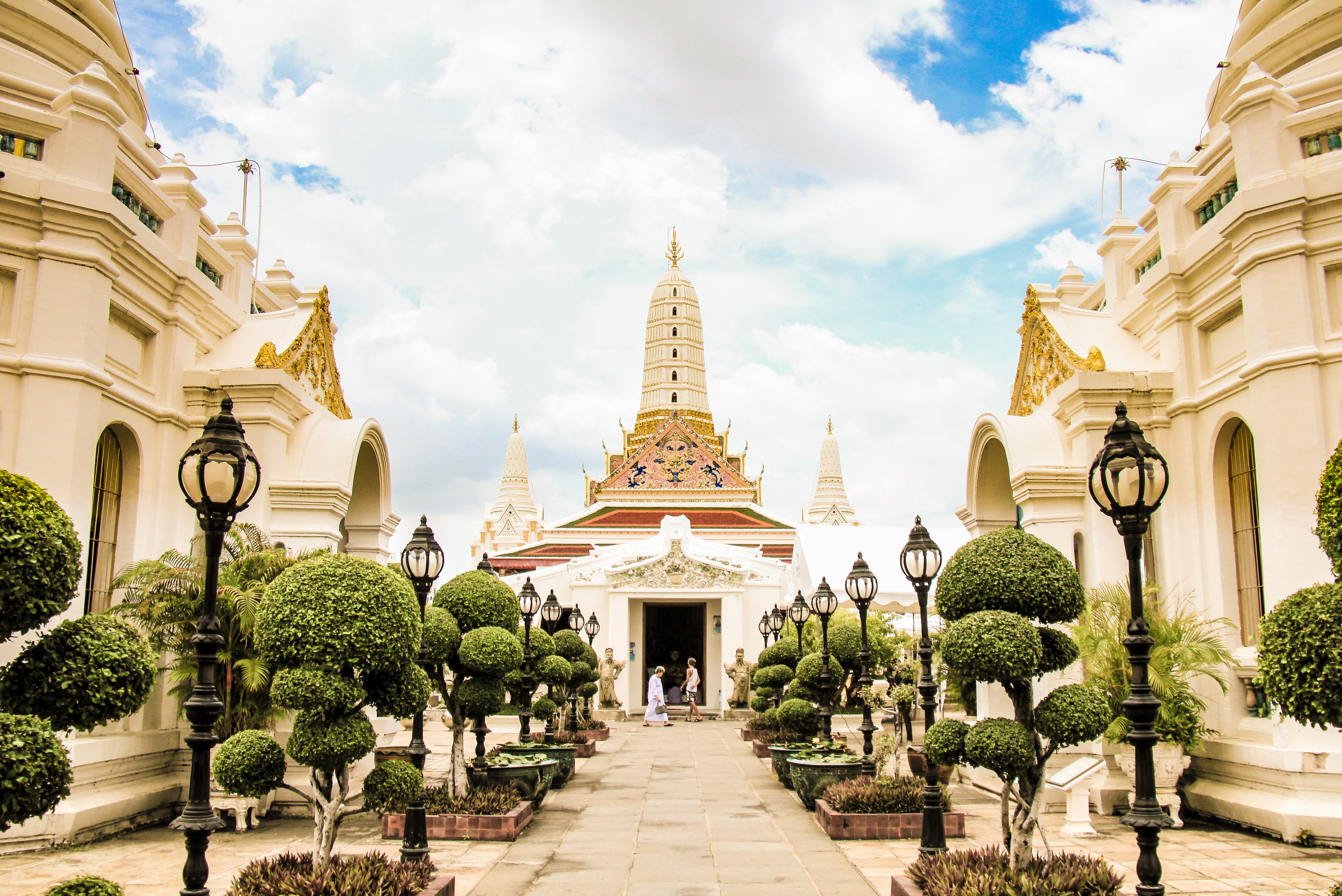
- Façade of the ordination hall

- Location within Bangkok

Religion
- Affiliation: Buddhism
- Sect: Theravāda
- Status: active

Location
- Location: 685 Soi Somdet Chao Phraya 2, Somdet Chao Phraya, Khlong San, Bangkok
- Country: Thailand
- Interactive map of Wat Phichai Yat
- Coordinates: 13.733189°N 100.496706°E

Architecture
- Completed: 1829-1832 (major restoration)

Wat Phichaya Yatikaram Worawihan, also referred to as Wat Phichai Yat (Thai: วัดพิชยญาติการาม, วัดพิชัยญาติ) is a Thai Buddhist temple in Bangkok, regarded as one of the most beautiful and outstanding temples of Bangkok and Thonburi side. The temple is located by the waterside of Khlong Somdet Chao Phraya in Khlong San District near present Wongwian Lek.

Wat Phichai Yat was registered to a national ancient monument by the Fine Arts Department in the year 1949.

== Gallery ==
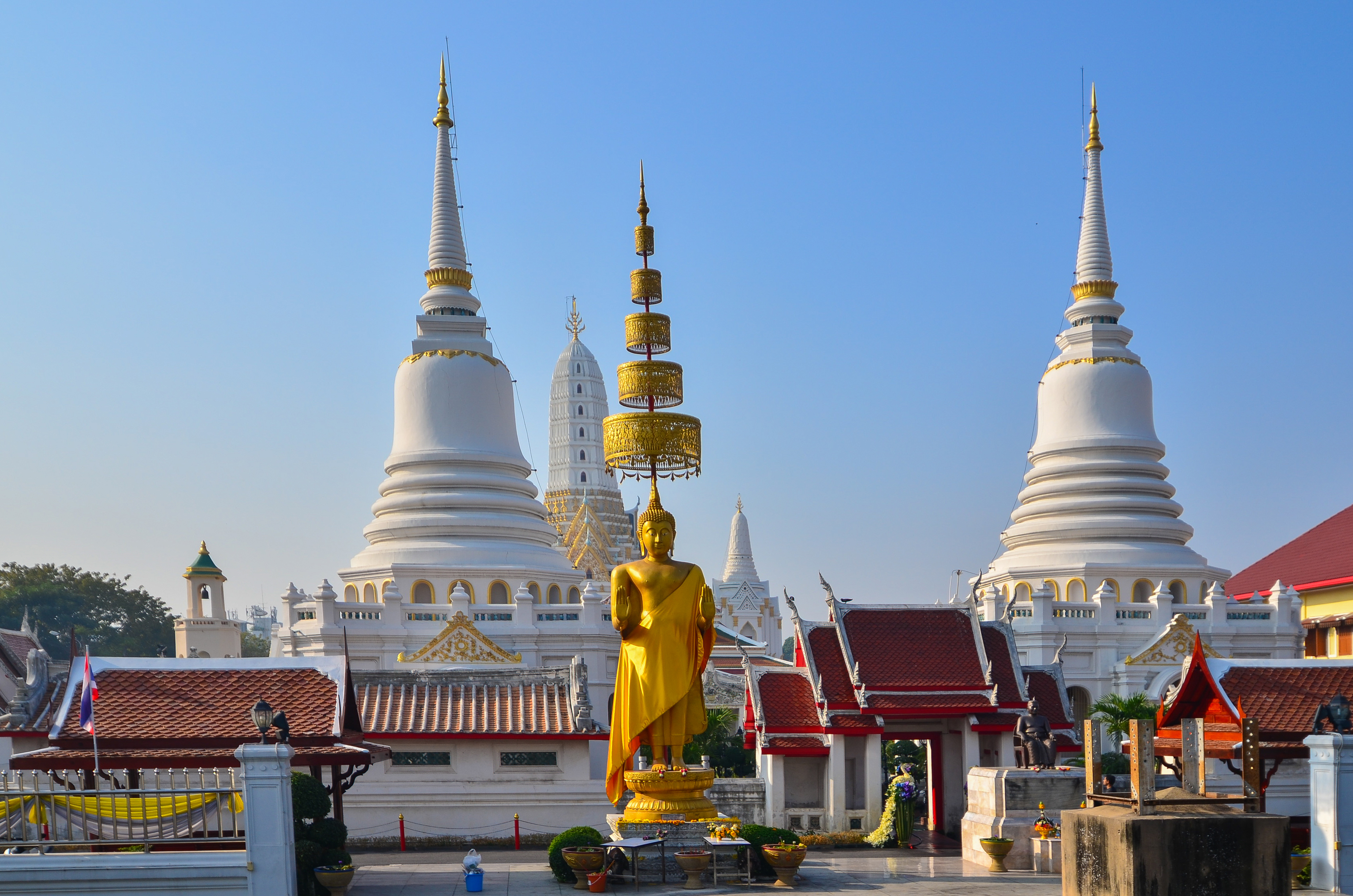
The temple and white stūpas

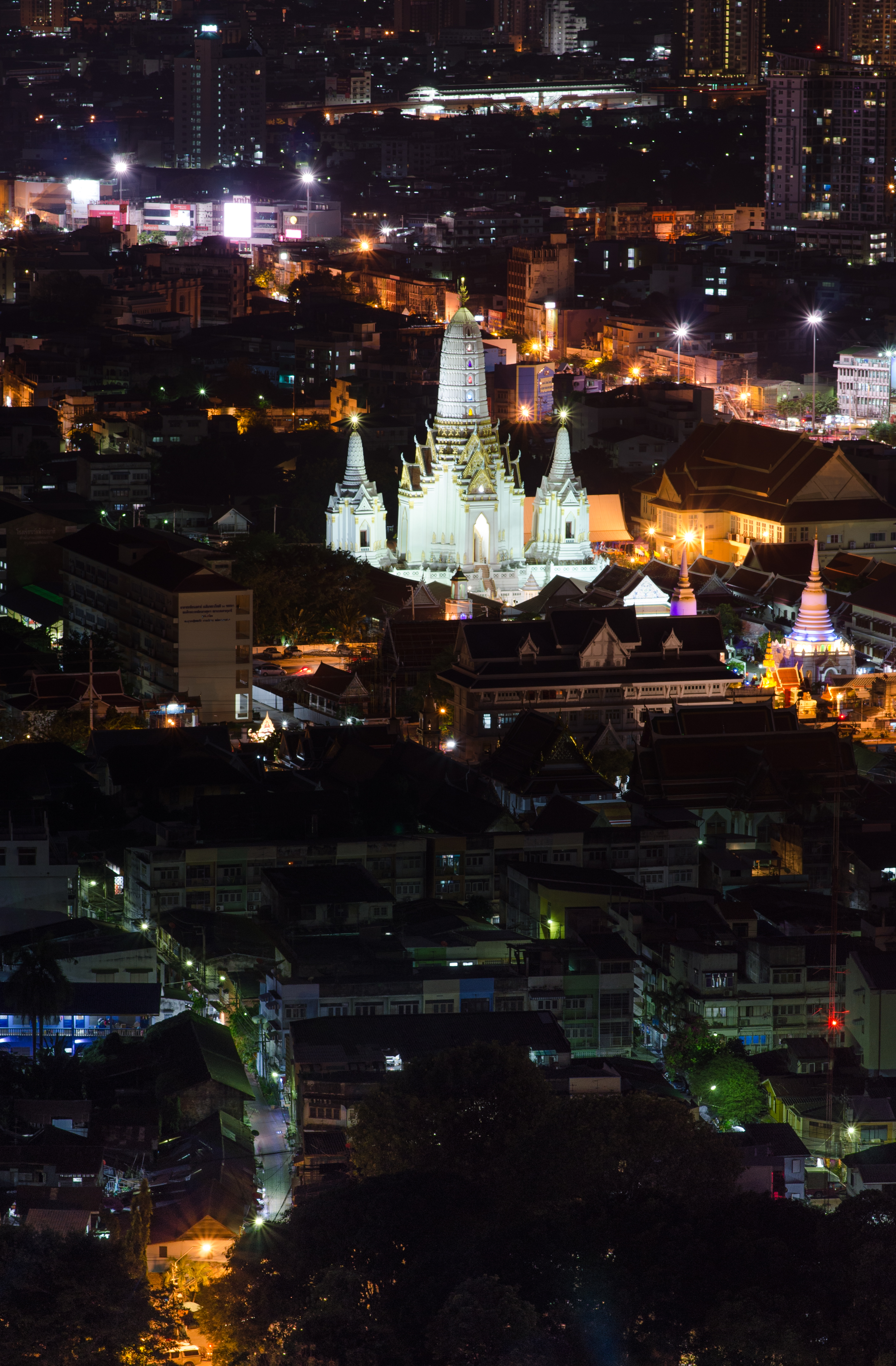
Aerial view by nighttime

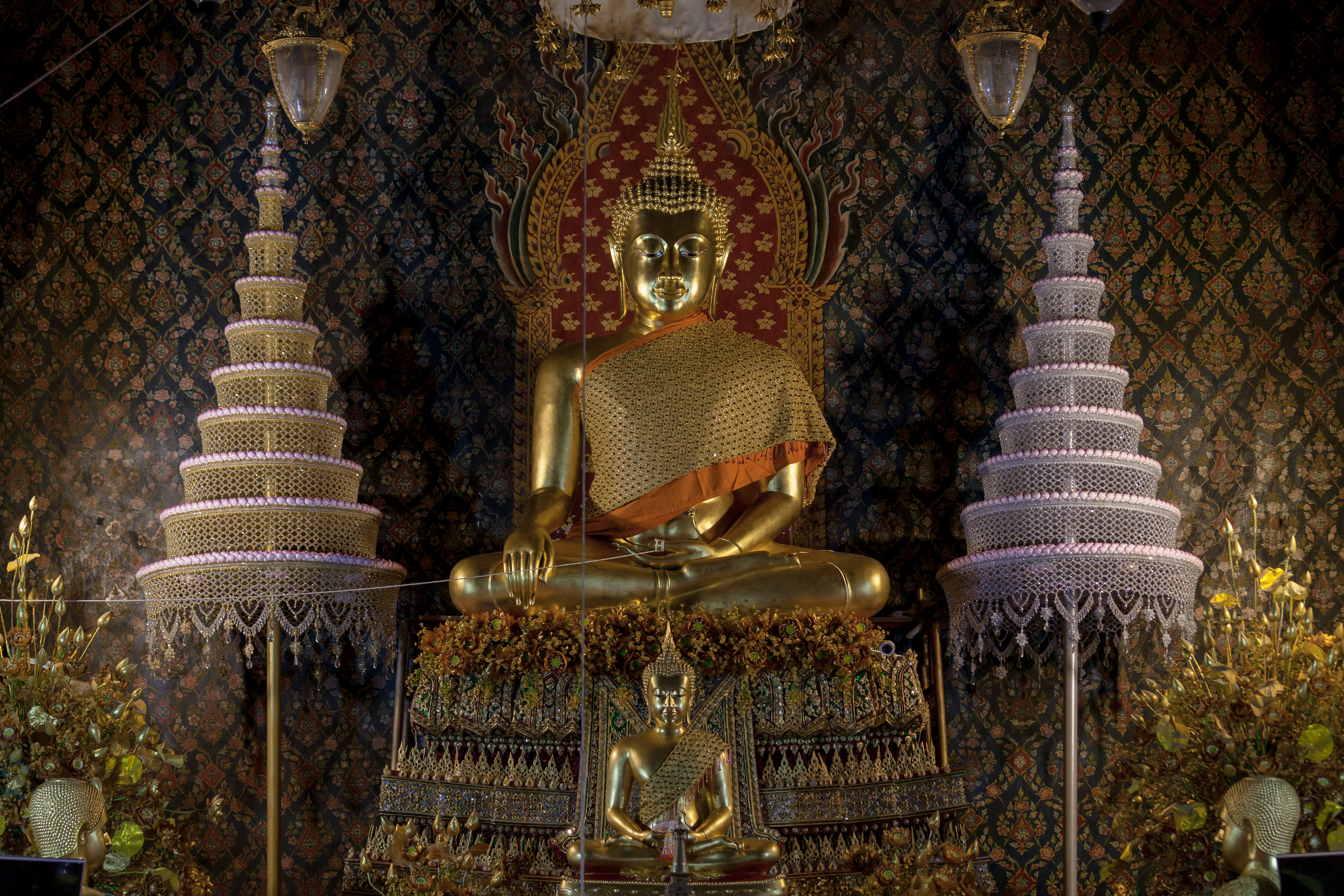
Phra Sittharot

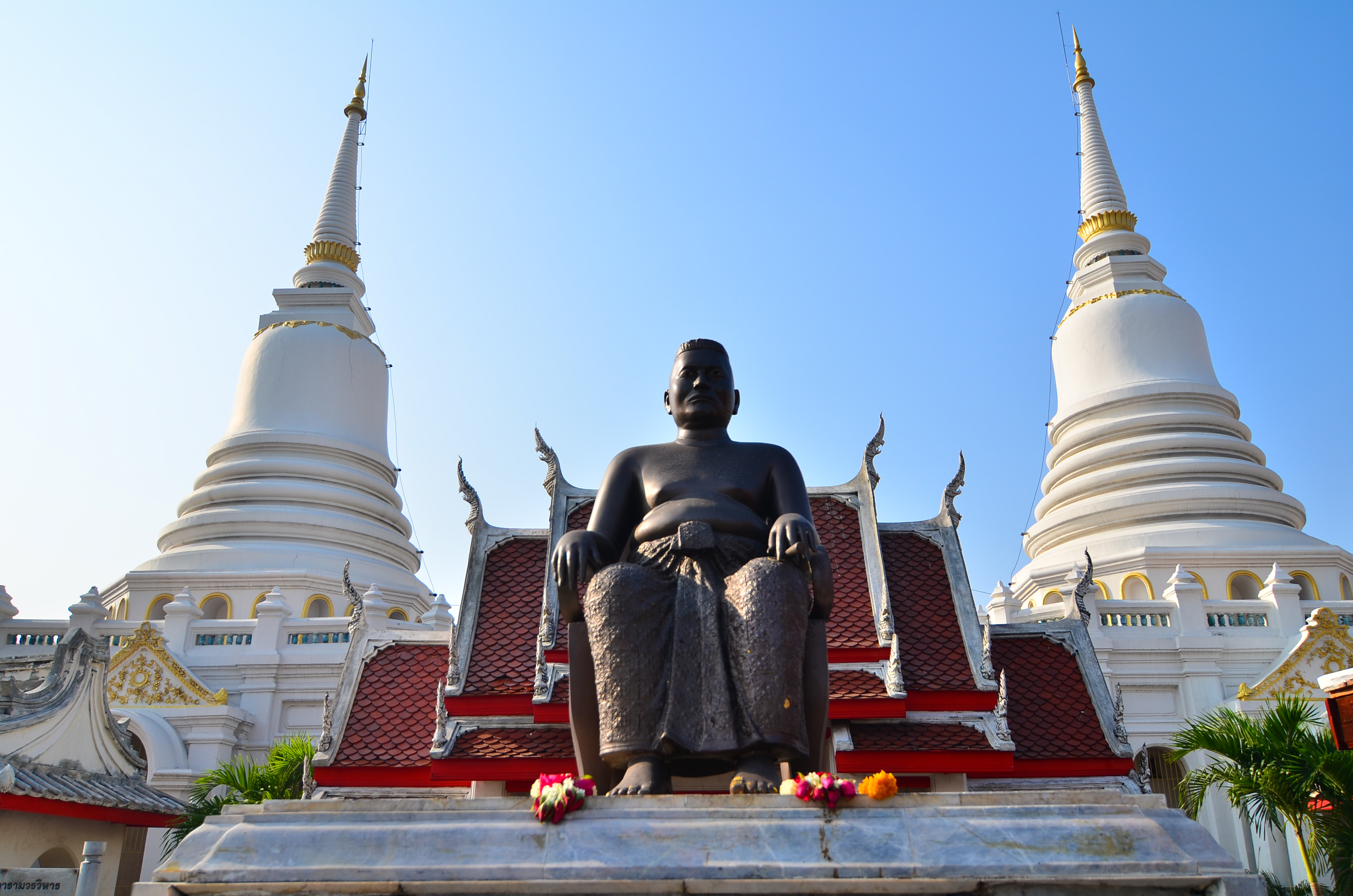
Monument of Somdet Chao Phraya Borom Maha Phichai Yat the restorer

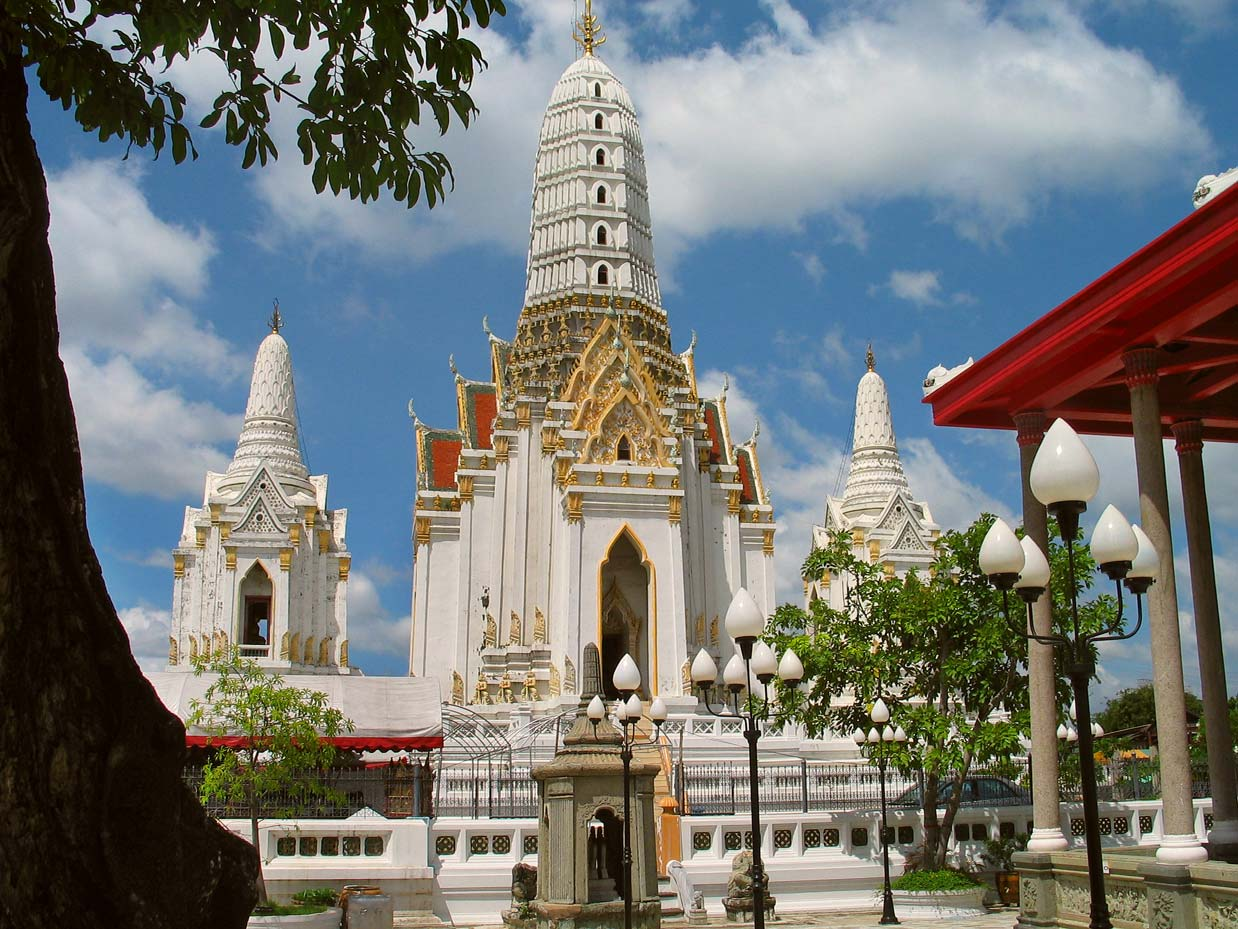
The Prang (Khmer-style pagoda)

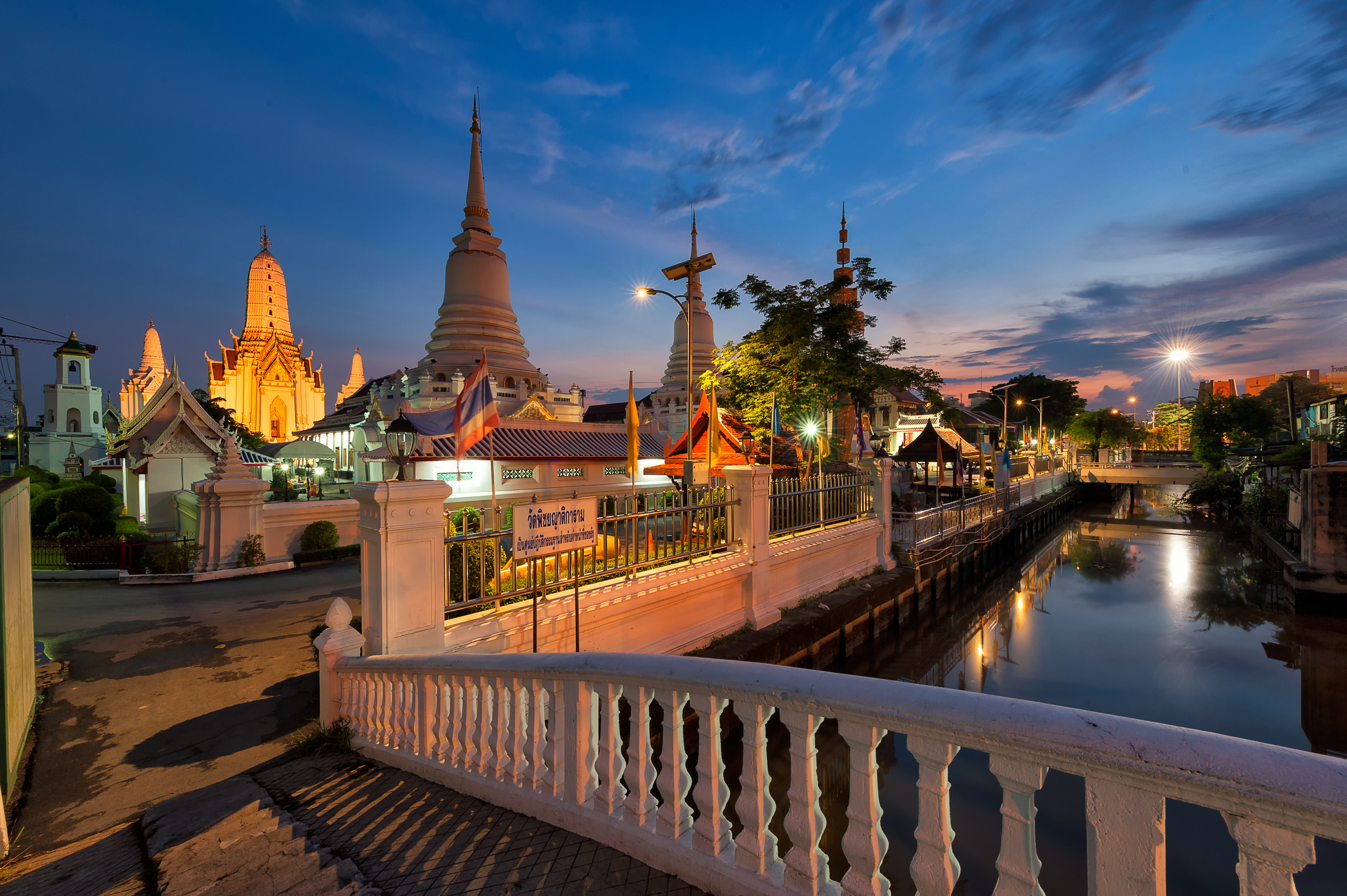
The temple and its footbridge over Khlong Somdet Chao Phraya by dusk

== See more ==
- Wat Anongkharam – a counterpart temple
