= Bang Lamphu Lang =

Coordinates: 13°52′56.1″N 100°17′16.6″E

Bang Lamphu Lang บางลำภูล่าง
- Khwaeng
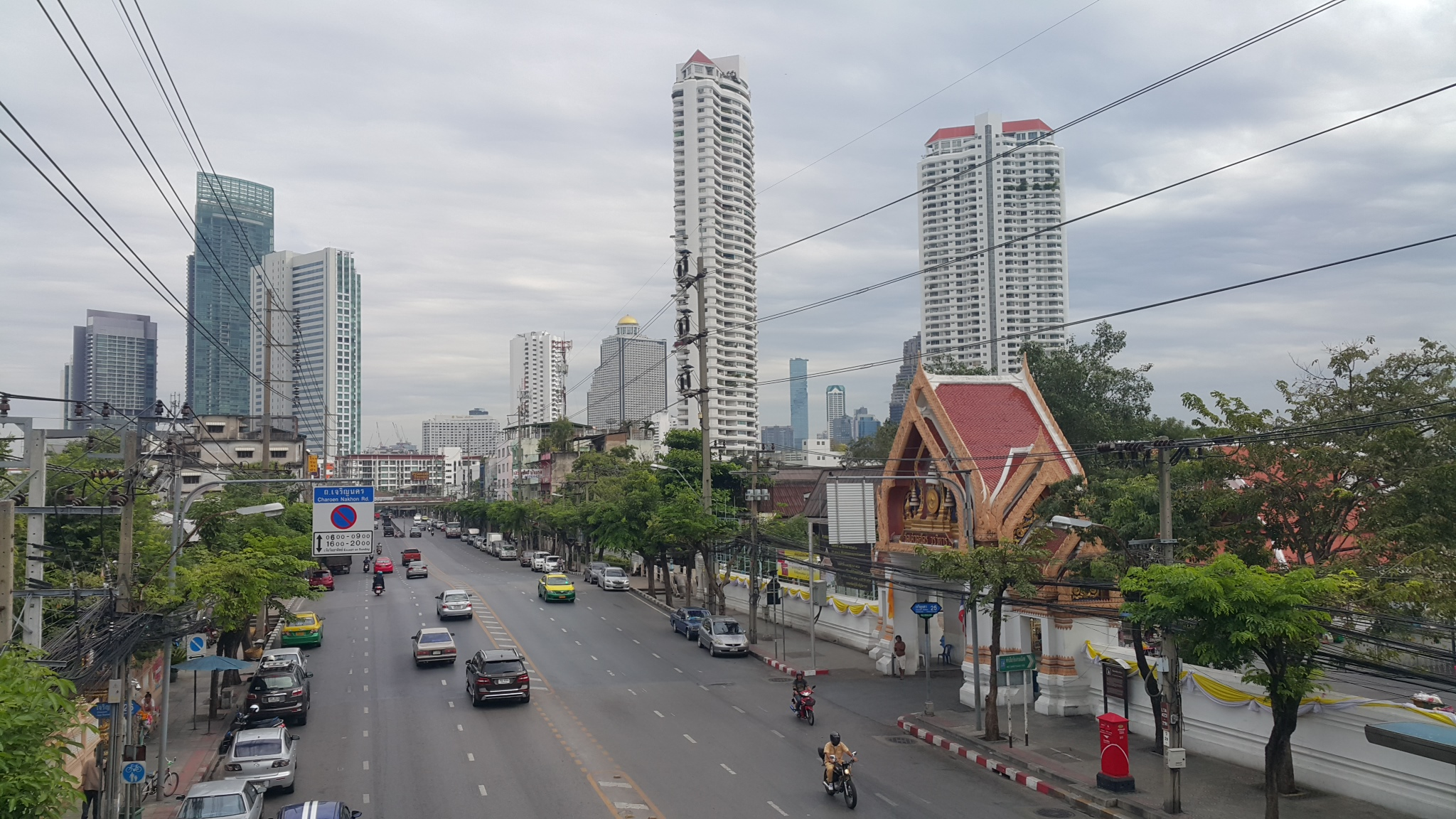
- Charoen Nakhon road in front of Wat Sawettachat Worawihan

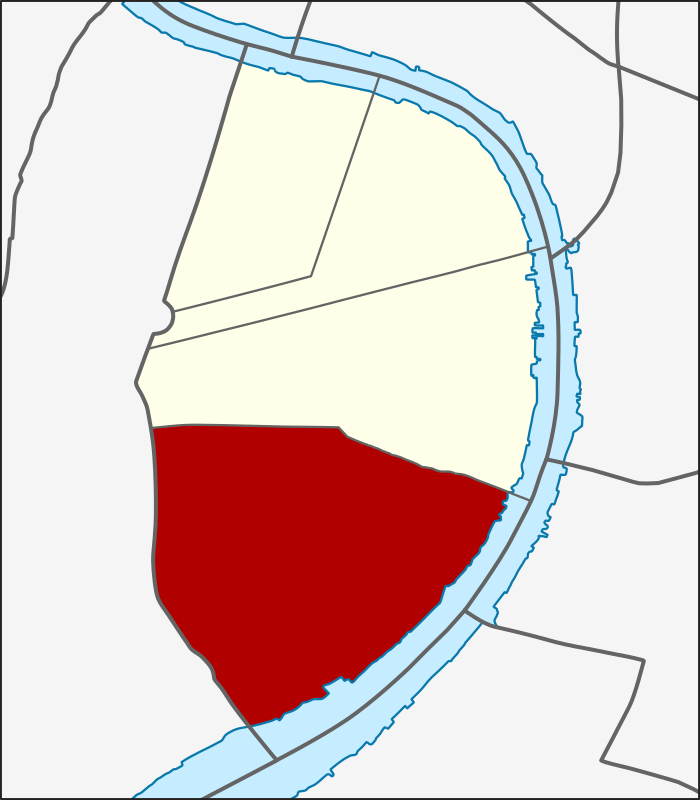
- Location in Khlong San District
- Country: Thailand
- Province: Bangkok
- Khet: Khlong San

Area
  - Total: 2.234 km^{2} (0.863 sq mi)

Population (2020)
  - Total: 23,513
- Time zone: UTC+7 (ICT)
- Postal code: 10600
- TIS 1099: 101803

Bang Lamphu Lang (Thai: บางลำภูล่าง, pronounced [bāːŋ lām.pʰūː lâːŋ]) is a khwaeng (subdistrict) of Khlong San district, Bangkok's Thonburi side (west bank of Chao Phraya river).

== History ==
Originally, Bang Lamphu Lang was the name for the entire Khlong San area. Its name was changed to Khlong San during the reign of King Vajiravudh (Rama VI). It became part of Bangkok in 1971 following the merger of Thonburi and Phra Nakhon provinces.

The name "Bang Lamphu Lang" means "lower place of mangrove apples". It shares the same origin as Bang Lamphu on the Phra Nakhon side (Bangkok core), as both areas were once located along the Chao Phraya River and known for their mangrove apple trees (Sonneratia caseolaris, or lamphu in Thai) growing along the riverbanks. These trees were also the habitat of fireflies. Today, as in Bang Lamphu, the mangrove apples and fireflies have disappeared, but the name remains in use for the area.

In the past, Bang Lamphu Lang (including other parts of Khlong San) was home to many large businesses, such as salt warehouses, fish sauce factories, wheat flour mills, sawmills, and tanneries. It was also the residence of several wealthy Sino Thai families, including the Wanglee, Pisolyabutra, and Kiangsiri families, as well as the influential Bunnag noble family. Later, an Indian businessman, Ibrahim Ali Nana, purchased and rented land here to live and conduct business among fellow Indians, eventually creating an Indian settlement. He was the ancestor of the Nana family, whose descendants include Lek Nana.

== Geography ==
Bang Lamphu Lang has an area of 2.47 km^{2} (0.95 mi^{2}).

Charoen Nakhon road is a main route of the subdistrict.

Neighbouring subdistricts are (from the north clockwise): Khlong Ton Sai in its district, Yan Nawa of Sathon district and Wat Phraya Krai of Bang Kho Laem district (across Chao Phraya river), Samre and Bukkhalo of Thon Buri district.

== Places ==
- Wat Sawettachat Worawihan
- Wat Suttharam and Wat Suttharam High School
- Lim Clansmen Association of Thailand
- Charoen Nakhon Animal Hospital
