= Khlong San district =

Khlong San คลองสาน
- Khet
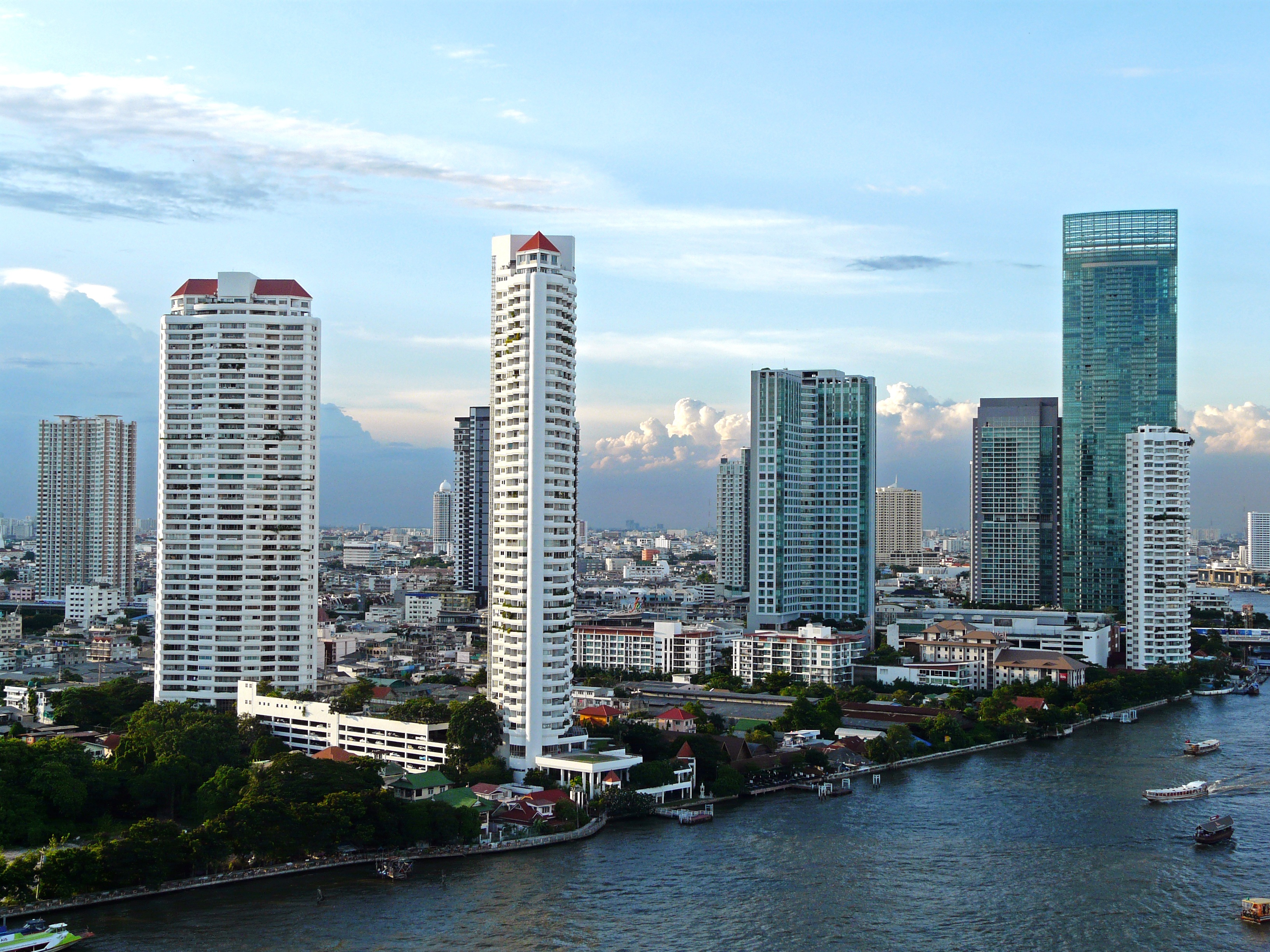
- Skyscrapers on the Chao Phraya River, Khlong San

- Khet location in Bangkok
- Coordinates: 13°43′49″N 100°30′35″E
- Country: Thailand
- Province: Bangkok
- Seat: Khlong San
- Khwaeng: 4

Area
  - Total: 6.051 km^{2} (2.336 sq mi)

Population (2017)
  - Total: 73,263
  - Density: 12,107.59/km^{2} (31,358.5/sq mi)
- Time zone: UTC+7 (ICT)
- Postal code: 10600
- Geocode: 1018

Khlong San (Thai: คลองสาน, pronounced [kʰlɔ̄ːŋ sǎːn]) is one of the 50 districts (khet) of Bangkok, Thailand. On the west bank of Chao Phraya River, its neighboring districts across the river are (from north clockwise) Phra Nakhon, Samphanthawong, Bang Rak, Sathon, and Bang Kho Laem. On the west side of the river, the only land neighbor is Thon Buri district.

== History ==
Khlong San is one of the oldest districts of Bangkok with a long history. Its name comes from a khlong (คลอง; lit: canal) that runs through the area, called "Khlong San" or "Khlong Prasan". It starts from the Chao Phraya River and flows toward Khlong Somdet Chao Phraya Ong Noi in front of Wat Phichai Yat, connecting with several other canals such as Khlong Wat Thong Thammachat, Khlong Wat Thong Nopphakhun, and Khlong Lat Ya. All of these were waterways passing through the local orchards. The most famous fruit of Khlong San was longkong (a type of langsat). Around 70 to 80 years ago, many of the canals were excavated and replaced by roads such as Lat Ya, Prajadhipok, and Khlong San Roads; now known collectively as Somdet Chao Phraya Road.

Khlong San was called, in chronological order, Amphoe Bang Lamphu Lang (บางลำภูล่าง), Amphoe Buppharam (บุปผาราม), and Amphoe Khlong San (since 1916) when it was part of Thonburi Province. Its status was changed to king amphoe in 1938 and back to amphoe again in 1957 due to population changes. It became part of Bangkok after the merging of Thonburi and Phra Nakhon Provinces in 1971.

Khlong San was originally the terminus of the Maeklong Railway, but the line was cut back to Wongwian Yai in 1961 to ease traffic congestion.

== Administration ==
The district is divided into four sub-districts (khwaeng).

No.	Name	Thai	Area (km^{2})	Map
1.	Somdet Chao Phraya	สมเด็จเจ้าพระยา	1.317	Map
2.	Khlong San	คลองสาน	0.727	Map
3.	Bang Lamphu Lang	บางลำภูล่าง	2.234	Map
4.	Khlong Ton Sai	คลองต้นไทร	1.773	Map
Total			6.051	Map

== Places ==
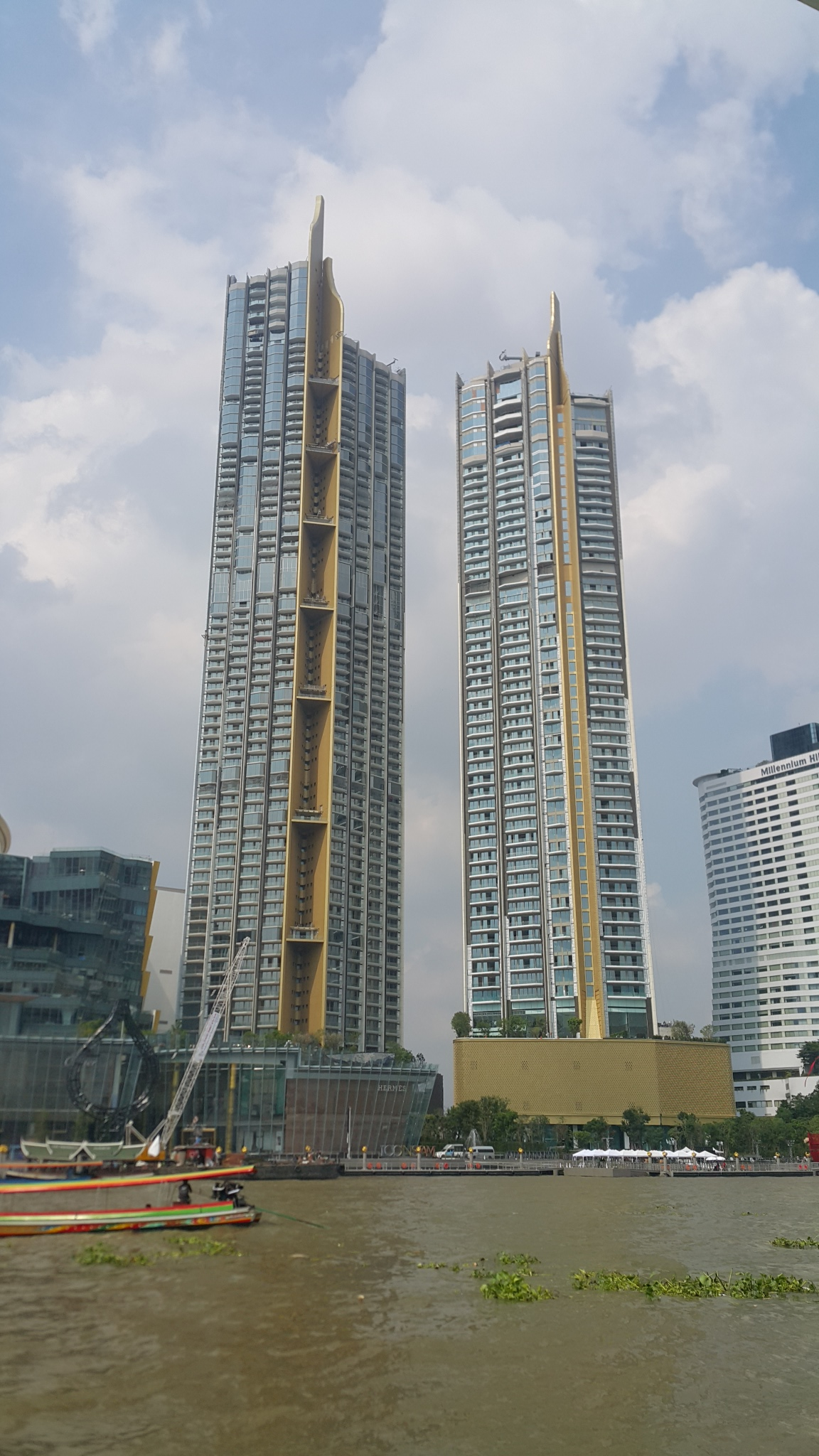
Magnolias Waterfront Residences at ICONSIAM, the tallest building in Bangkok

- King Taksin Monument and Wongwian Yai (วงเวียนใหญ่)
- Wat Anongkharam (วัดอนงคาราม)
- Wat Sawettachat (วัดเศวตฉัตร)
- Wat Phichai Yat (วัดพิชัยญาติ)
- Wat Thong Thammachat (วัดทองธรรมชาติ)
- Wat Thong Nopphakhun (วัดทองนพคุณ)
- PLATF@RM (แพลตฟอร์ม)
- Princess Mother Memorial Park (อุทยานสมเด็จพระศรีนครินทร์) and Thang Nguan Hah Vintage House (เก๋งจีนทั้งง่วนฮะ) with Guan Yu Shrine (ศาลเจ้ากวนอู)
- Wang Li House (บ้านหวั่งหลี) and Lhong 1919 (ล้ง 1919) with Mazu Shrine (ศาลเจ้าแม่ทับทิมคลองสาน)
- Tha Din Daeng (ท่าดินแดง)
- Pong Patchamit Fort (ป้อมป้องปัจจามิตร)
- ICONSIAM (ไอคอนสยาม)
- Sinn Sathorn Tower (สินสาธรทาวเวอร์)
- Saichol Mansion (Residential Tower)

== Transportation ==
- Wongwian Yai is a major bus hub on the west side of the Chao Phraya River.
- The district is served by stations on two rapid transit lines:
  - Silom Line: Krung Thon Buri BTS station and Wongwian Yai BTS station
  - Gold Line (Bangkok): Krung Thon Buri BTS station, Charoen Nakorn station and Khlong San station

== Health ==
- Taksin Hospital, Bangkok Metropolitan Administration
- Somdet Chaopraya Institute of Psychiatry, Department of Mental Health, Ministry of Public Health

== Notable people ==
- Srinagarindra – mother of King Ananda Mahidol (Rama VIII) and King Bhumibol Adulyadej (Rama IX)

== Gallery ==
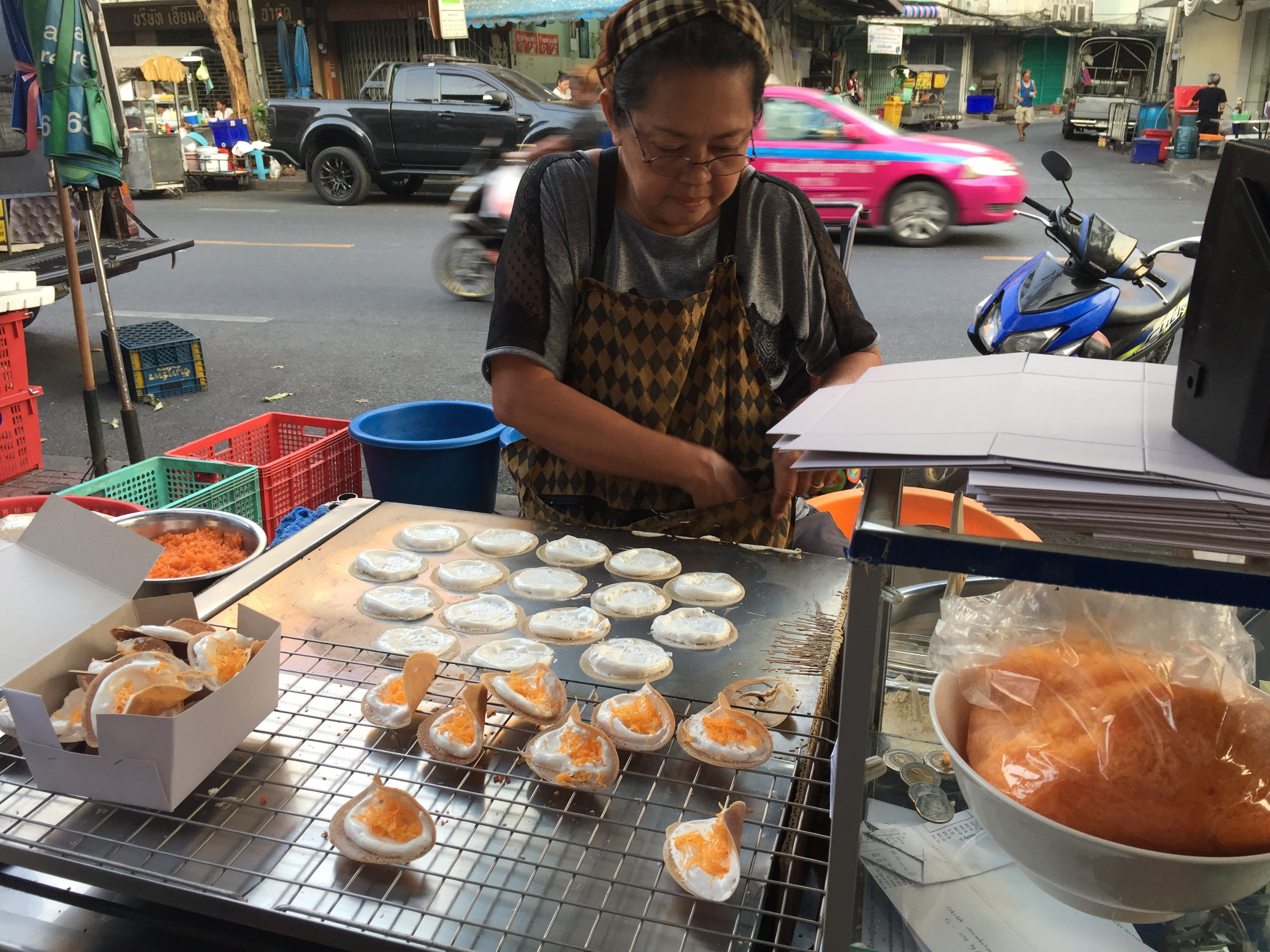
Mae ka (แม่ค้า; female trader in Thai) is cooking Khanom buang at Tha Din Daeng

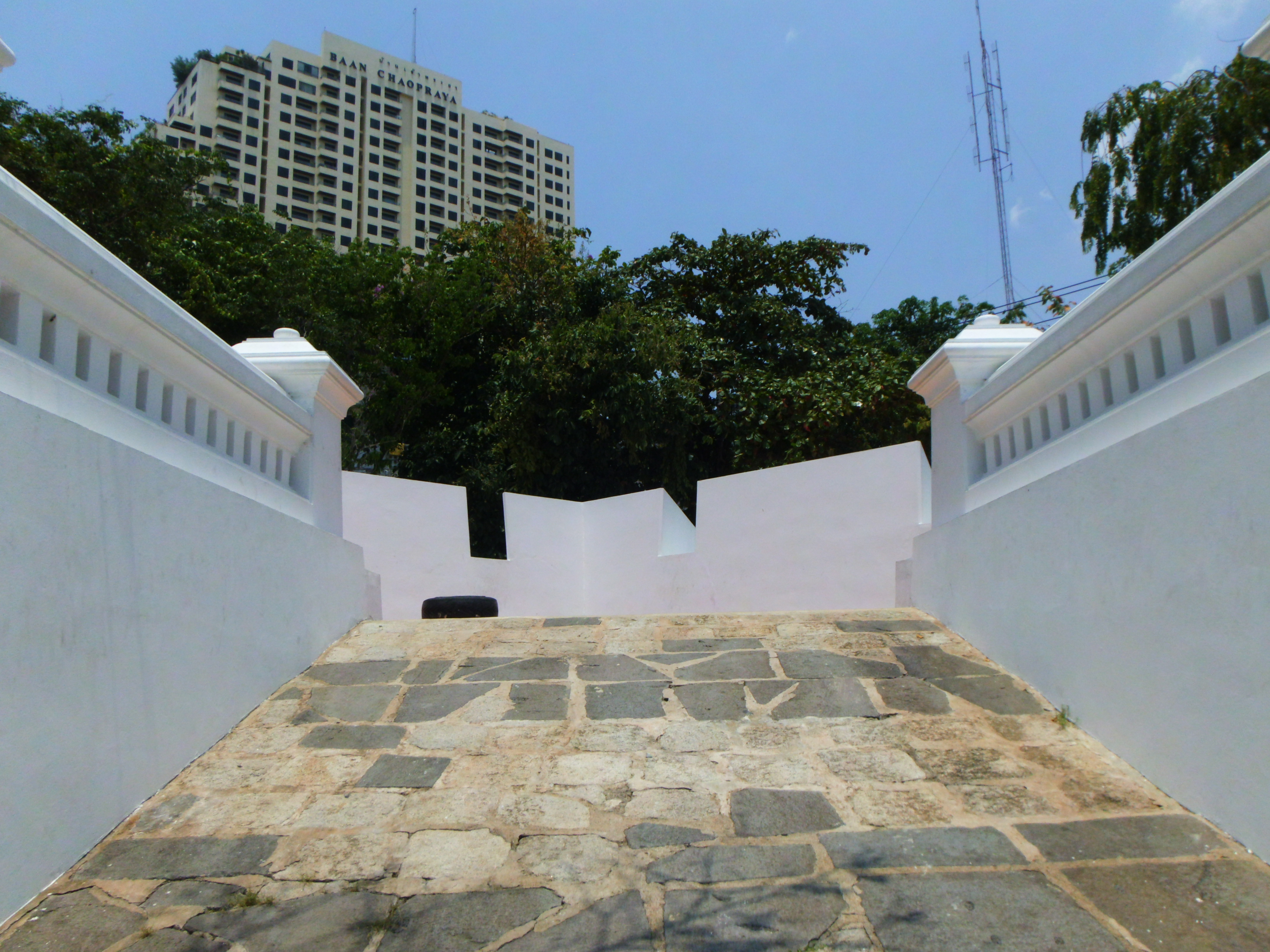
Pong Patchamit Fort

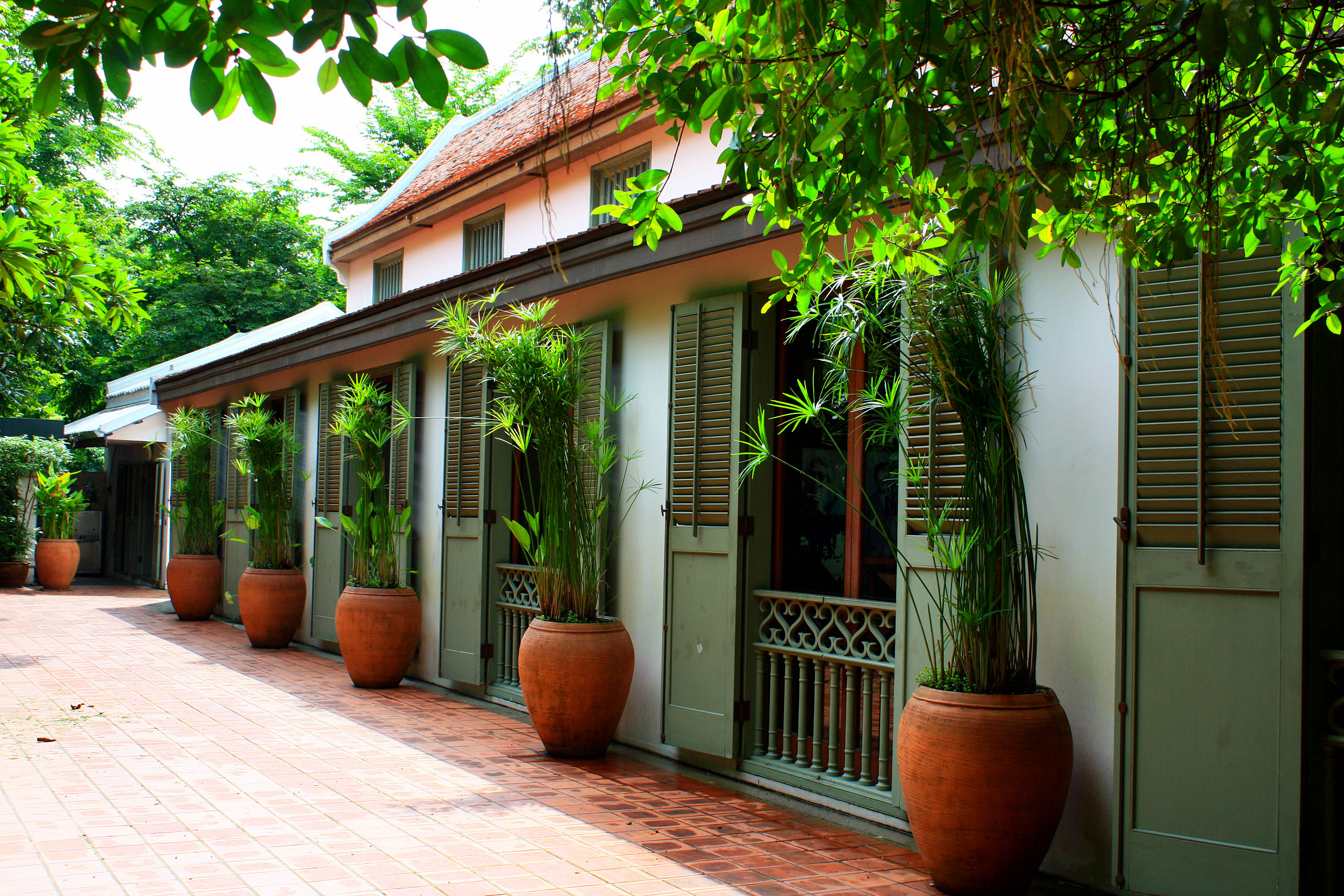
Inside Princess Mother Memorial Park

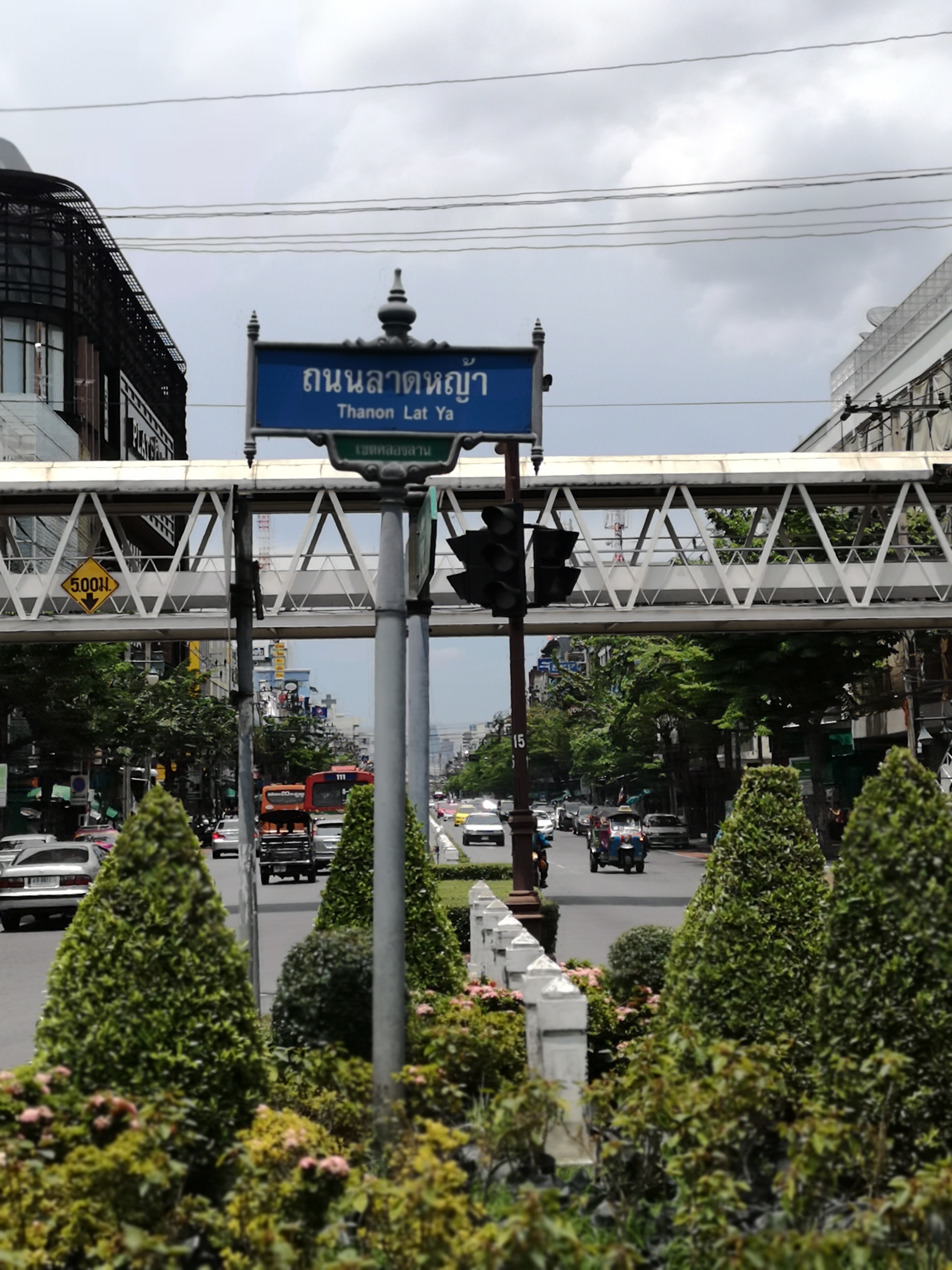
Lat Ya Road sign

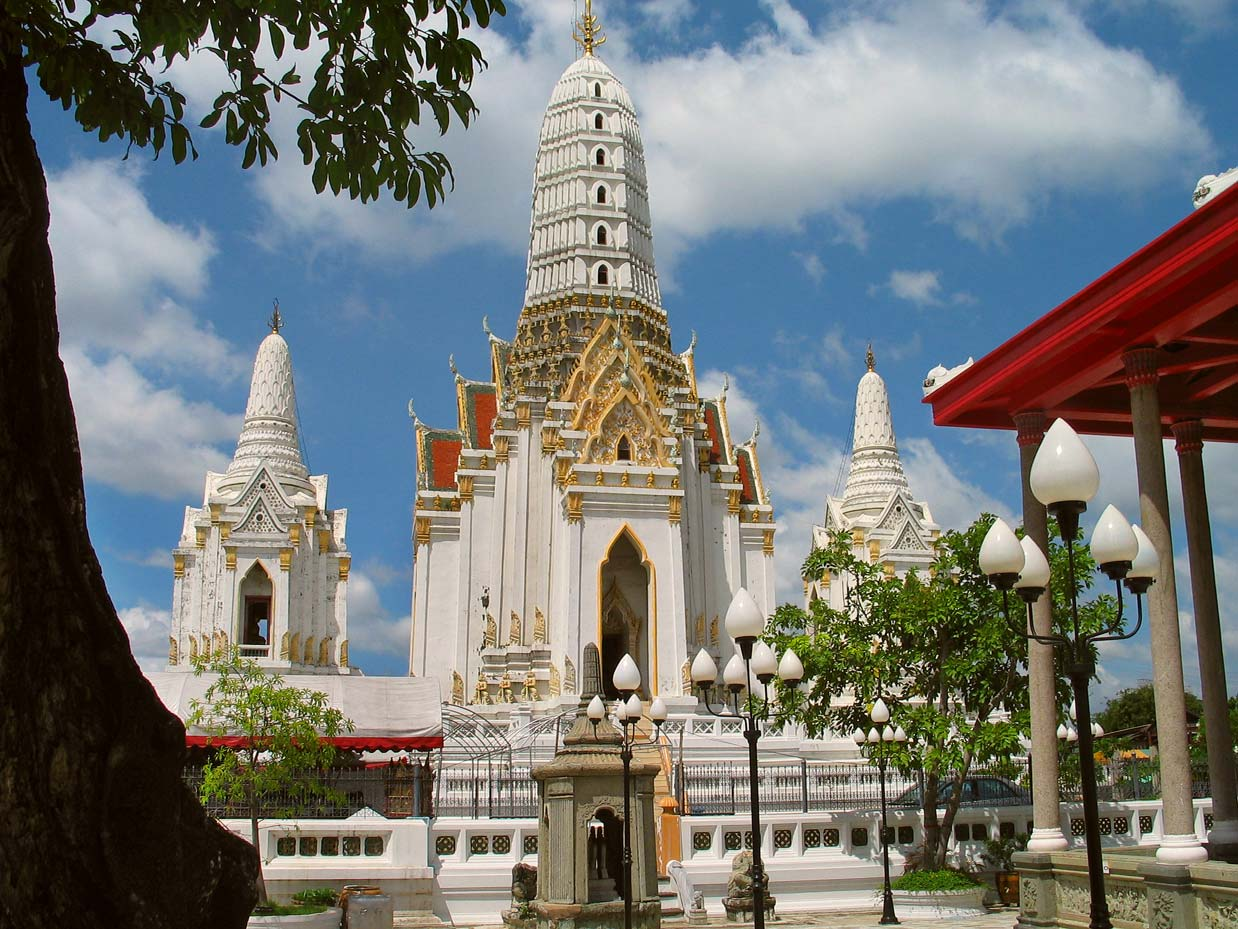
Phra Prang, Wat Phichai Yat

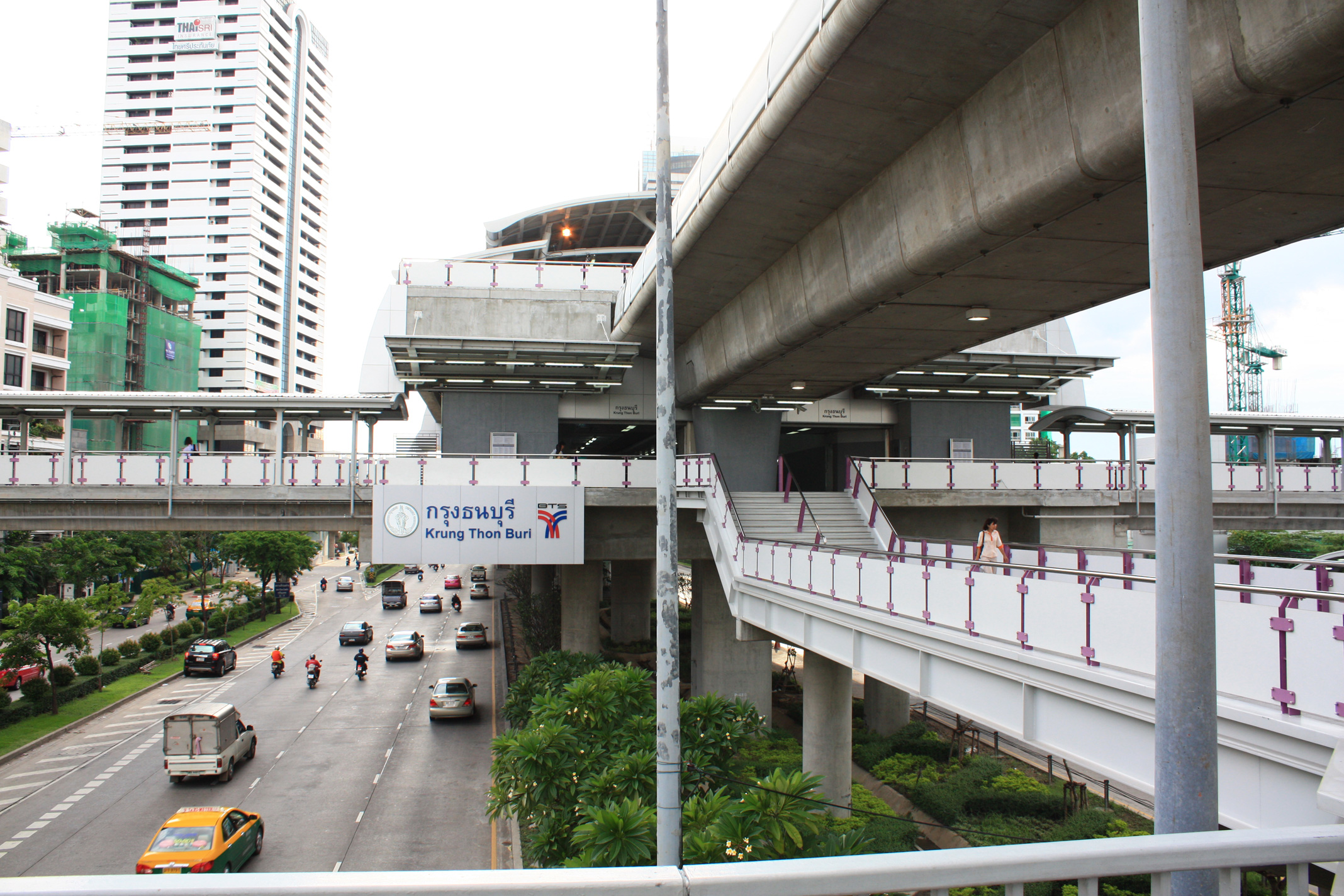
Krung Thon Buri Road from Krung Thon Buri BTS Station

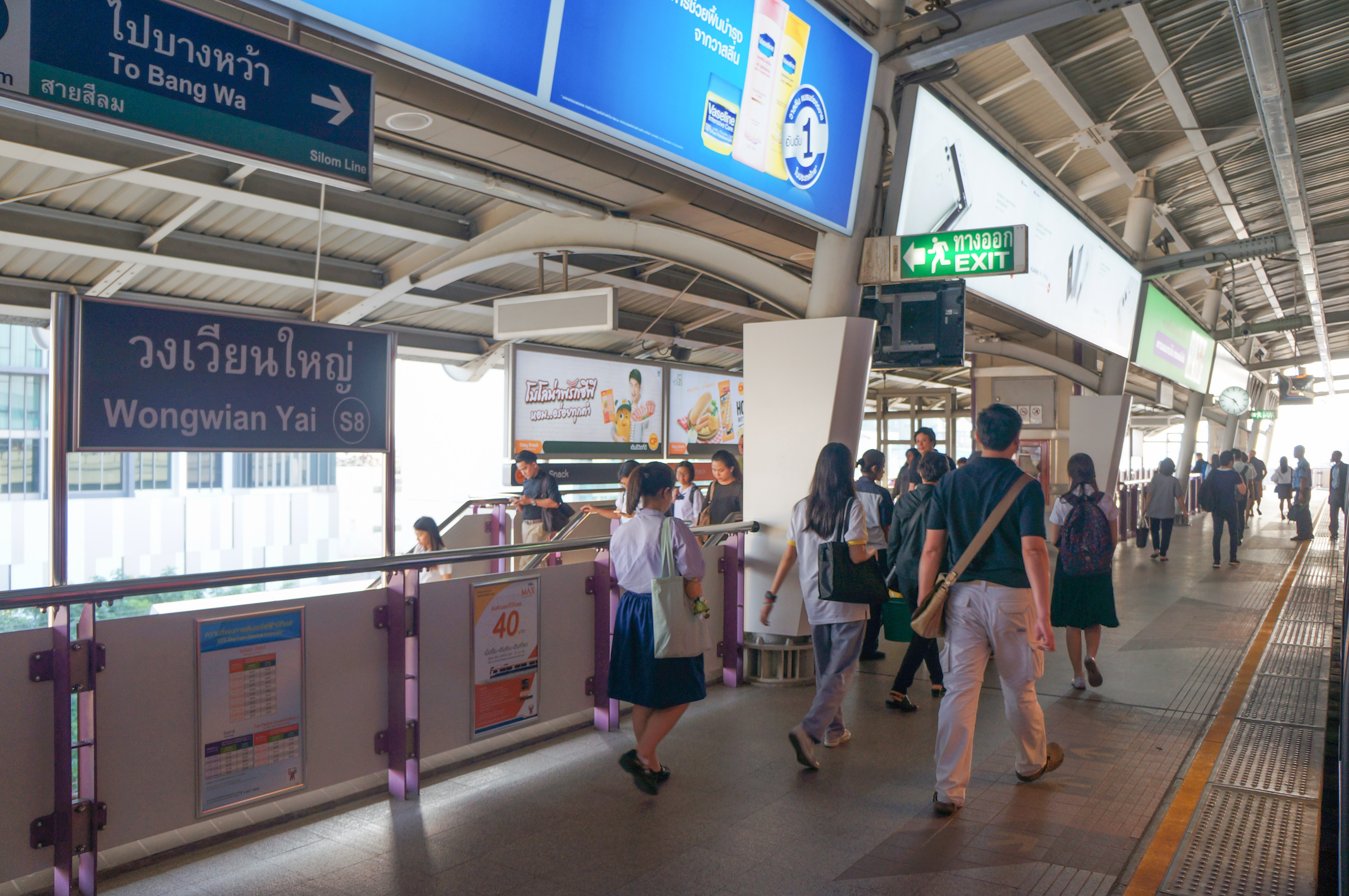
Wongwian Yai BTS Station

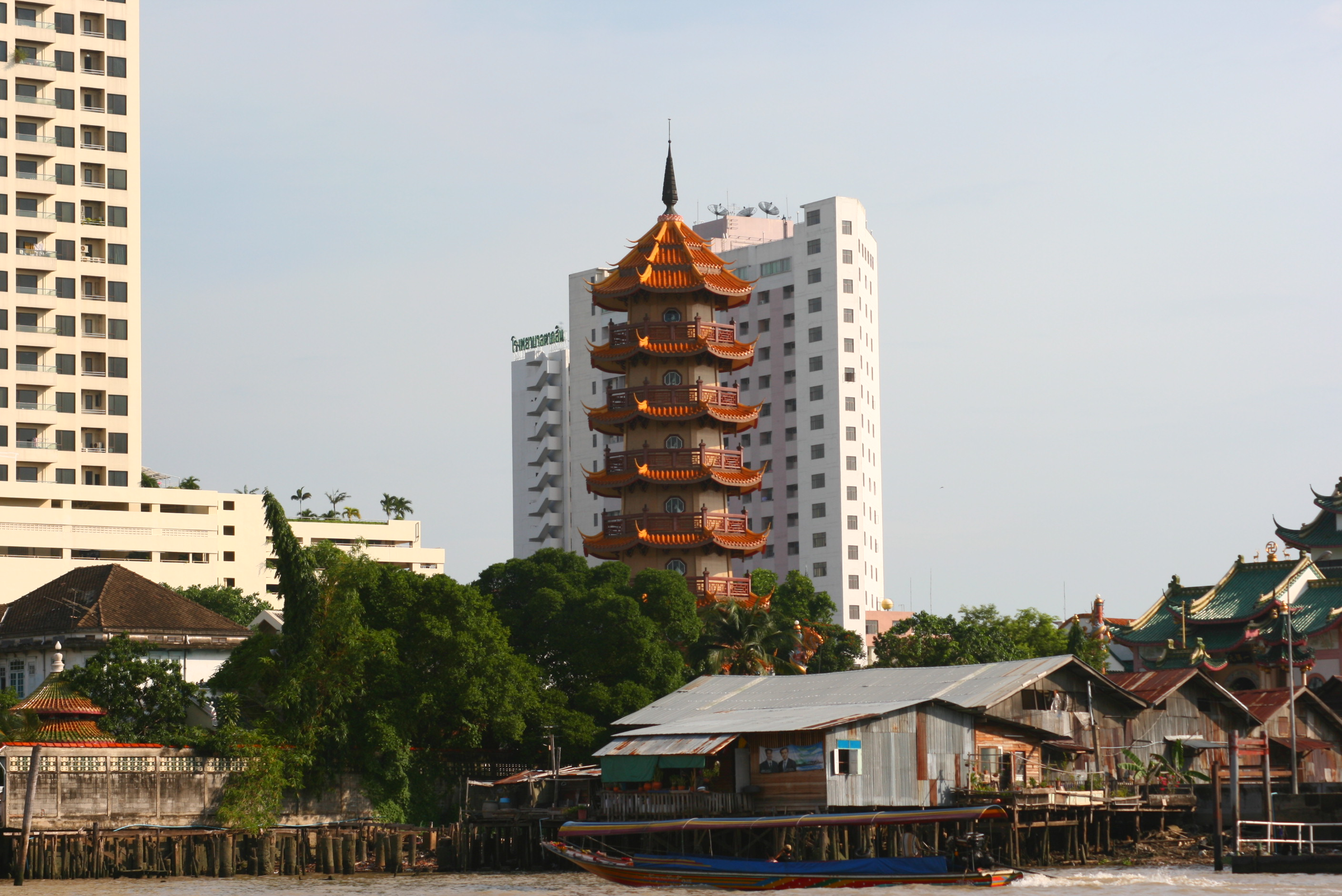
Pagoda, Chee Chin Khor Foundation, a historic Chinese temple

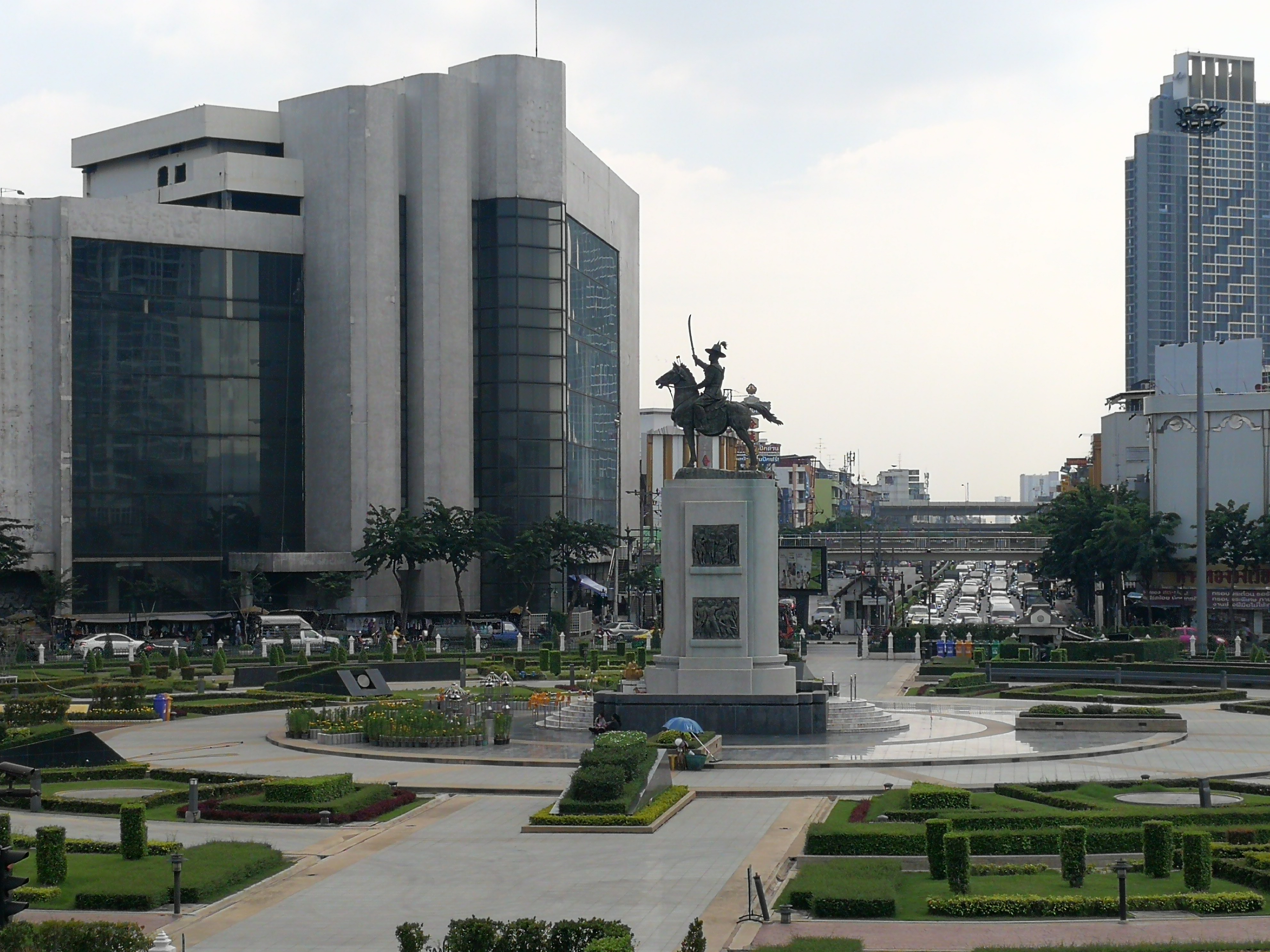
King Taksin Monument at Wongwian Yai, the left background is Khlong San

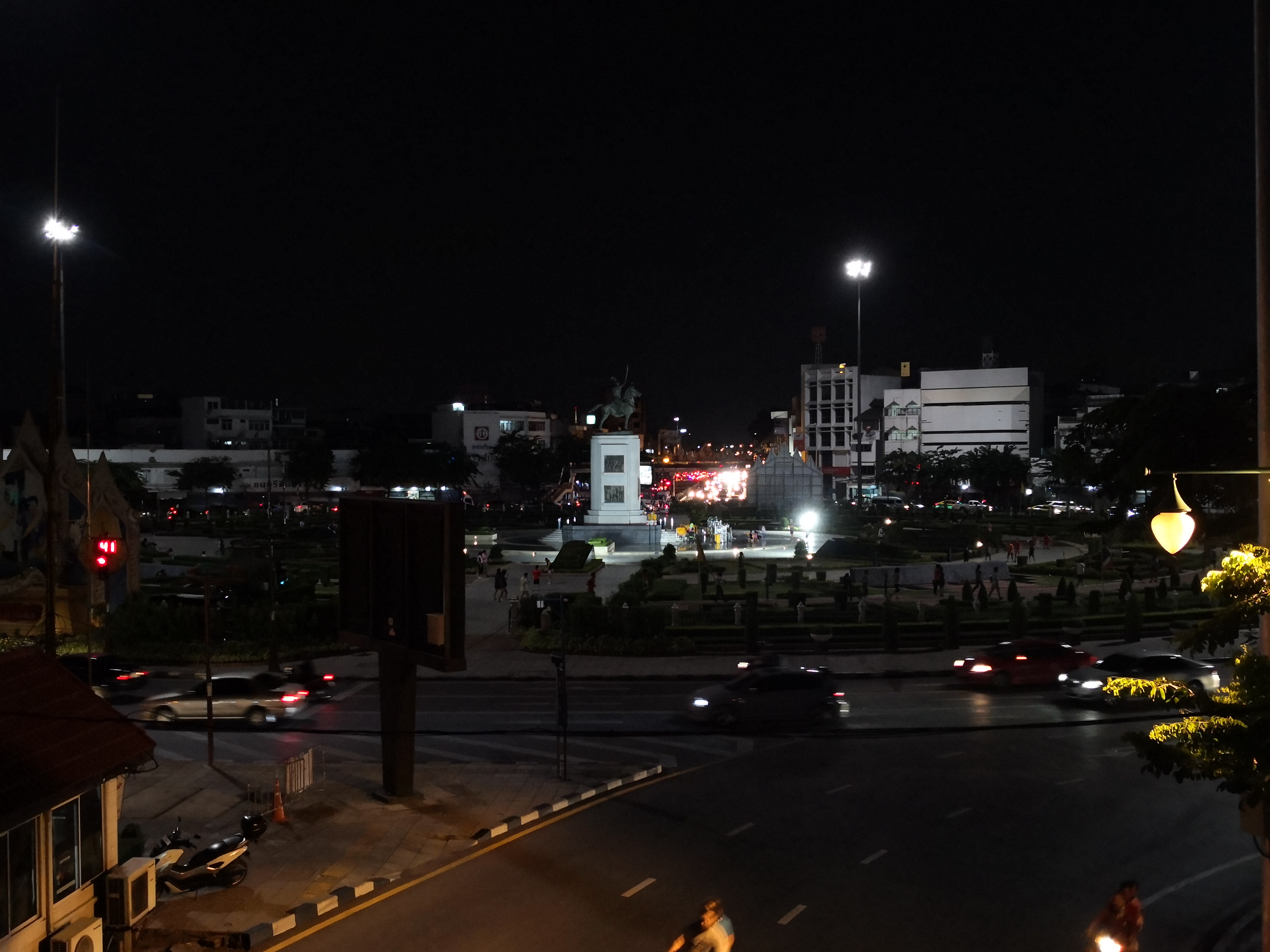
Wongwian Yai at night as seen from Khlong San area
