= Guan Yu Shrine, Khlong San =

Chinese temple in Bangkok, Thailand

Coordinates: 13°44′15.3″N 100°30′01.1″E

Guan Yu Shrine

Guan Yu Shrine or written as Gong Wu Shrine (Thai: ศาลเจ้ากวนอู) is a historic shrine of Lord Guan, Martial God of Loyalty and Righteousness in Chinese beliefs. Located in Khwaeng Somdet Chao Phraya, Khet Khlong San, Bangkok's Thonburi side on the western bank of Chao Phraya River.

This shrine is considered to be the oldest Guan Yu shrine in Thailand. Believed to be over 280 years old, built since the late Ayutthaya period in the reign of the King Borommakot (corresponding to the reign of Qianlong Emperor of Qing Dynasty) and said that before the King Taksin will do battle, he also came to worship at this shrine as well.

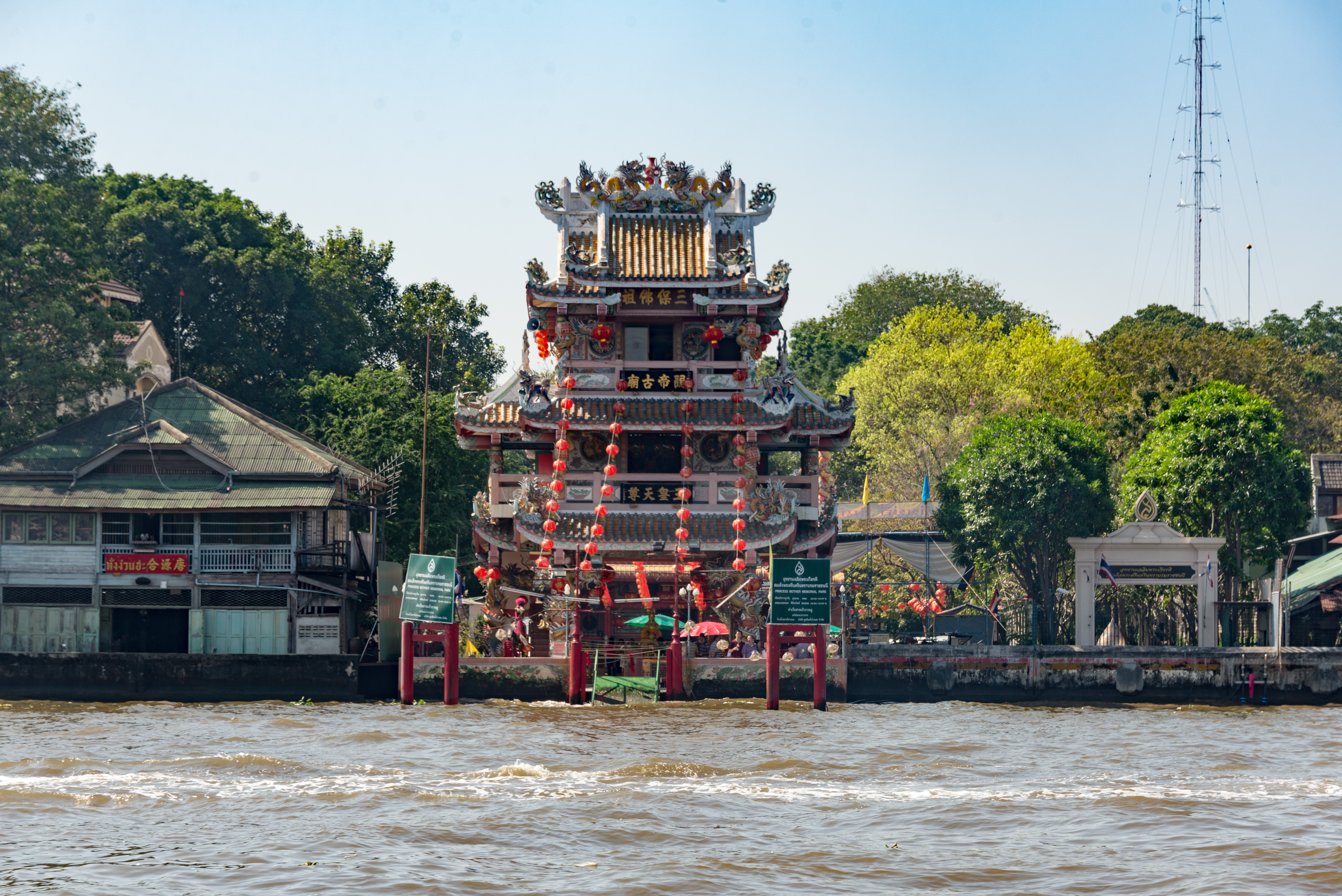
Guan Yu Shrine that is flanked by a Princess Mother Memorial Park (right) and Thang Nguan Hah Vintage House (left)

The shrine is just behind the Princess Mother Memorial Park, near the foot of twin Memorial and Phra Pok Klao Bridges. In the shrine, all three of Guan Yu's statues the first one is the oldest one that has been enshrined since the time when the shrine began to build, while the second one was brought in the reign of King Phutthayotfa Chulalok (Rama I) of Rattanakosin Kingdom and the third one was brought into the reign of King Phutthaloetla Naphalai (Rama II).

Also nearby is Thang Nguan Hah Vintage House, a vintage house in Chinese architecture adjacent to each other. This house was formerly a fish sauce factory since the reign of King Chulalongkorn (Rama V), which is considered the first fish sauce factory in Thailand as well.
