= Princess Mother Memorial Park =

Park in Bangkok, Thailand

- Thai: อุทยานเฉลิมพระเกียรติสมเด็จพระศรีนครินทราบรมราชชนนี
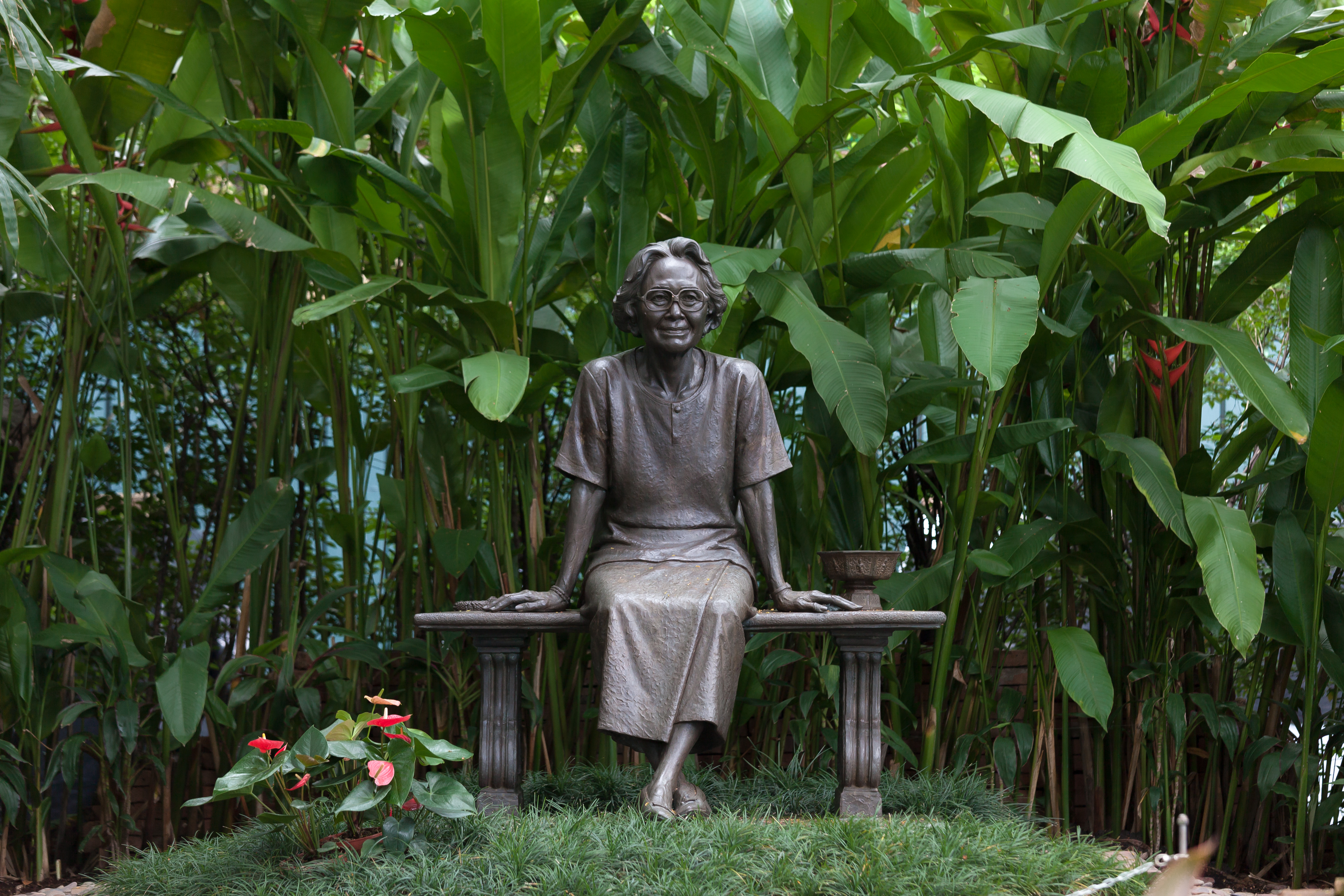
- The entrance of the park
- Interactive map of Princess Mother Memorial Park
- Type: Urban Park
- Location: Khlong San, Bangkok, Thailand
- Coordinates: 13°44′12″N 100°29′58″E
- Operator: Bangkok Metropolitan Administration

The Princess Mother Memorial Park (Thai: อุทยานเฉลิมพระเกียรติสมเด็จพระศรีนครินทราบรมราชชนนี, often shortened to สวนสมเด็จย่าฯ, Suan Somdet Ya, pronounced [sǔan sǒm.dèt jâː]) is a park in Bangkok, Thailand. It was established in 1993, and opened on January 21, 1997, by King Bhumibol Adulyadej, in remembrance of his mother, Srinagarindra, the Princess Mother.

The park contains gardens and a reproduction of the royal mother's childhood home, as well as two exhibition halls showing memorabilia of the princess and the royal family and a pavilion with a statue of the princess. There is also a souvenir shop which sells items from charitable foundations and social welfare organisations which used to be under her patronage; the profits go to help the poor and the destitute.

The park is in Khlong San District, close to the banks of the Chao Phraya River, near the south end of Phra Pok Klao Bridge, on Soi Somdet Chao Phraya 3, next to the Gong Wu Shrine.

Impressions of the park

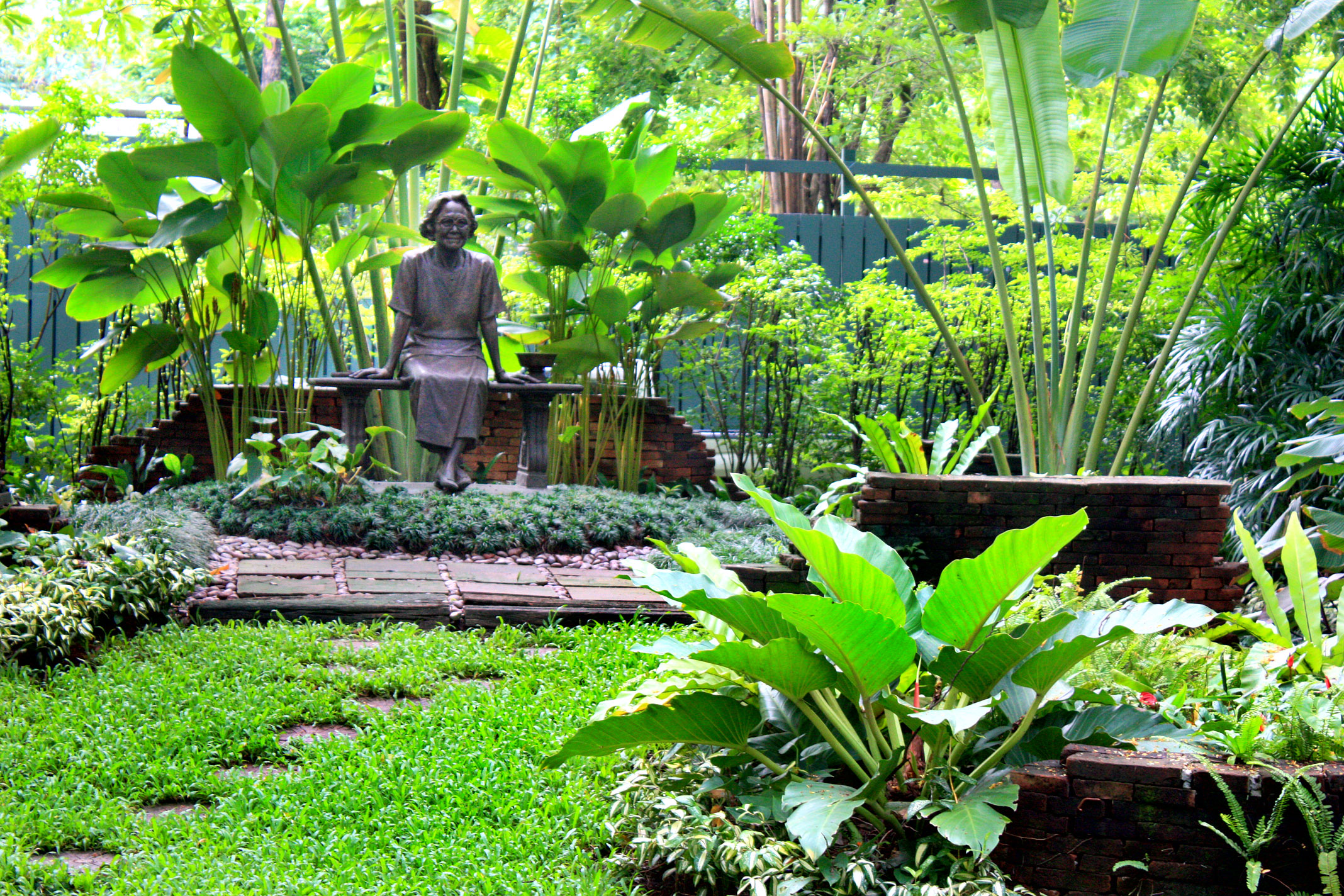
Sculpture of Srinagarindra

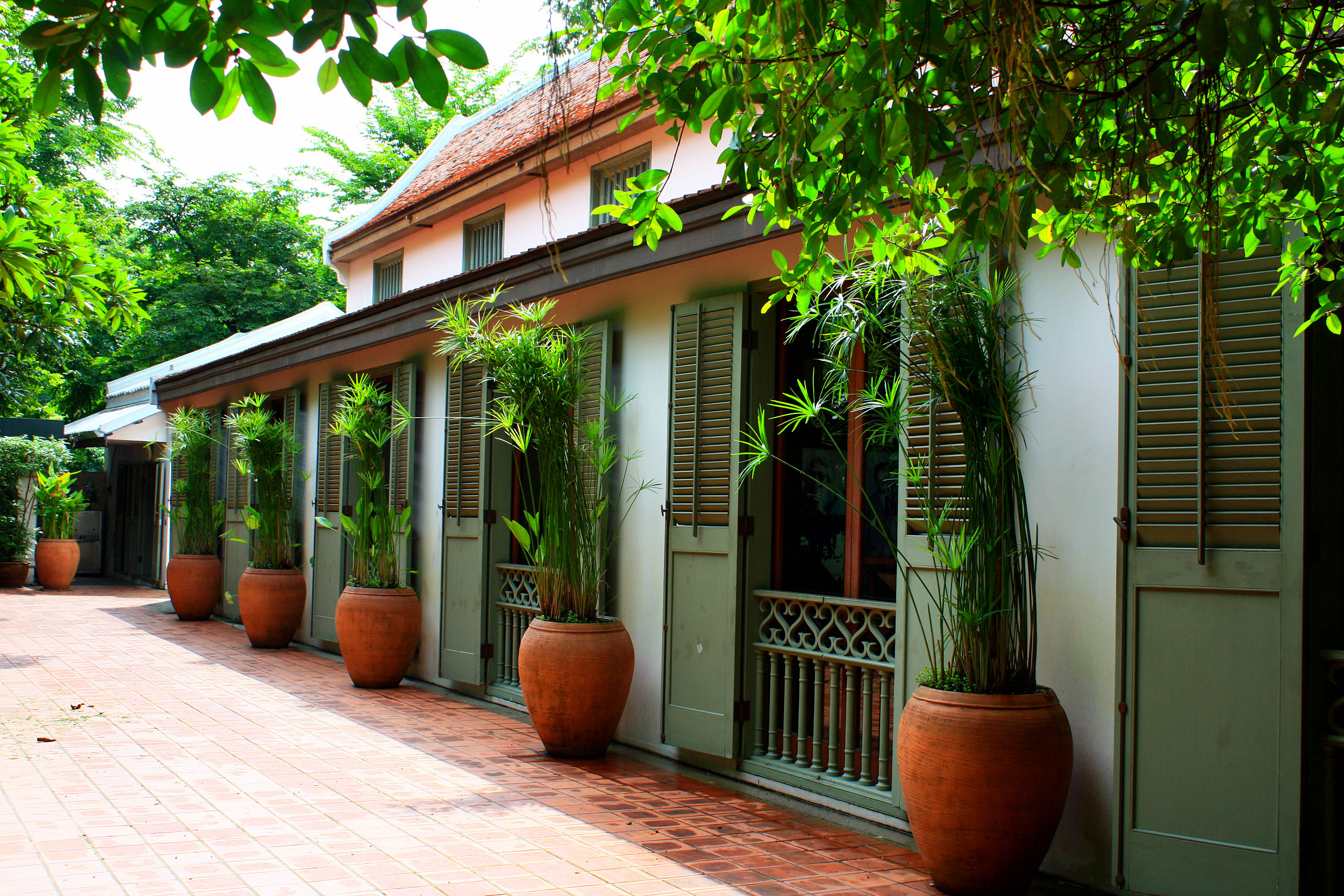
One of the museum buildings

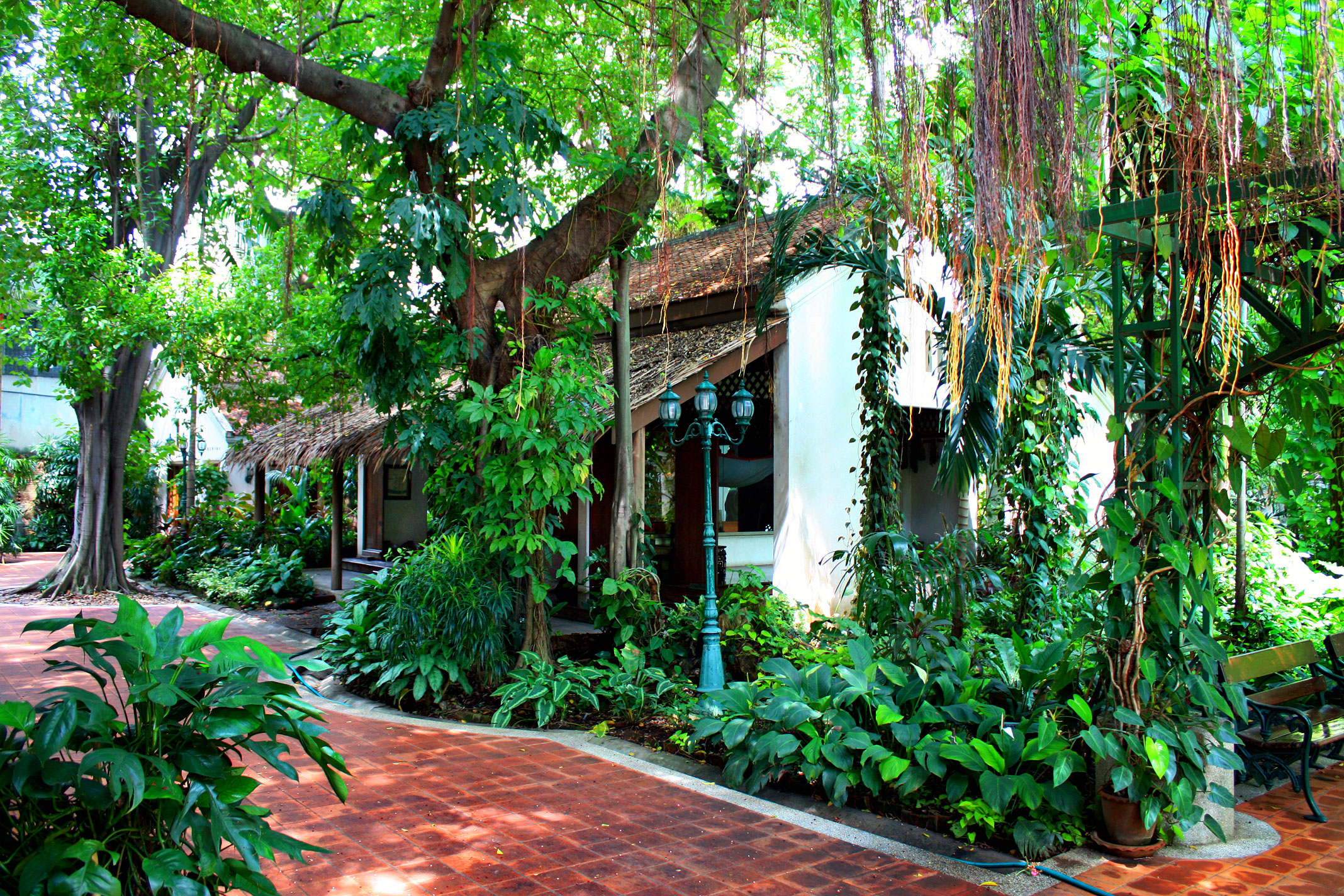
The "Model-House"

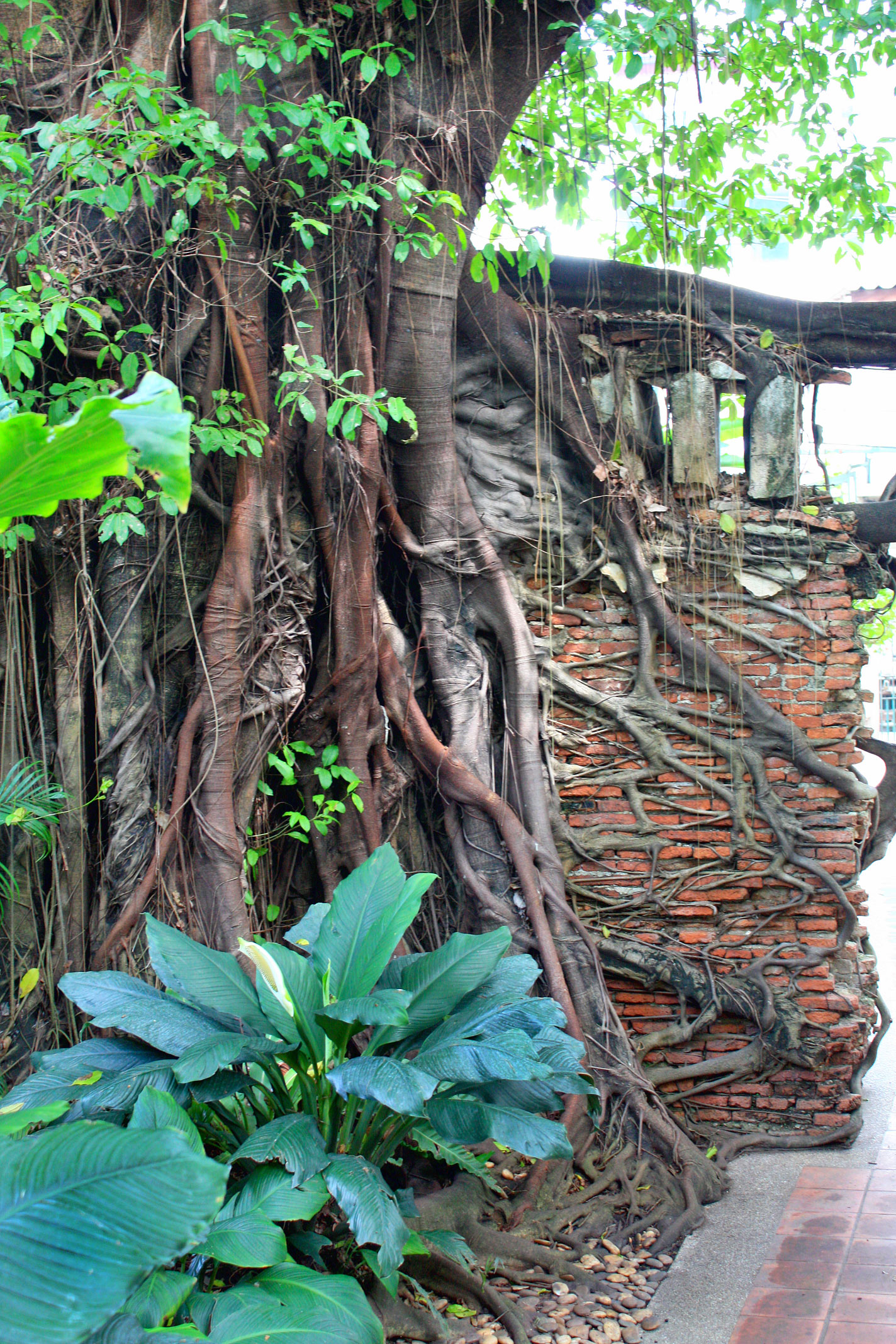
Ruin and tree in the park
