= Saphan Han =

Bridge in Thailand

Coordinates: 13°44′39.04″N 100°30′12.07″E

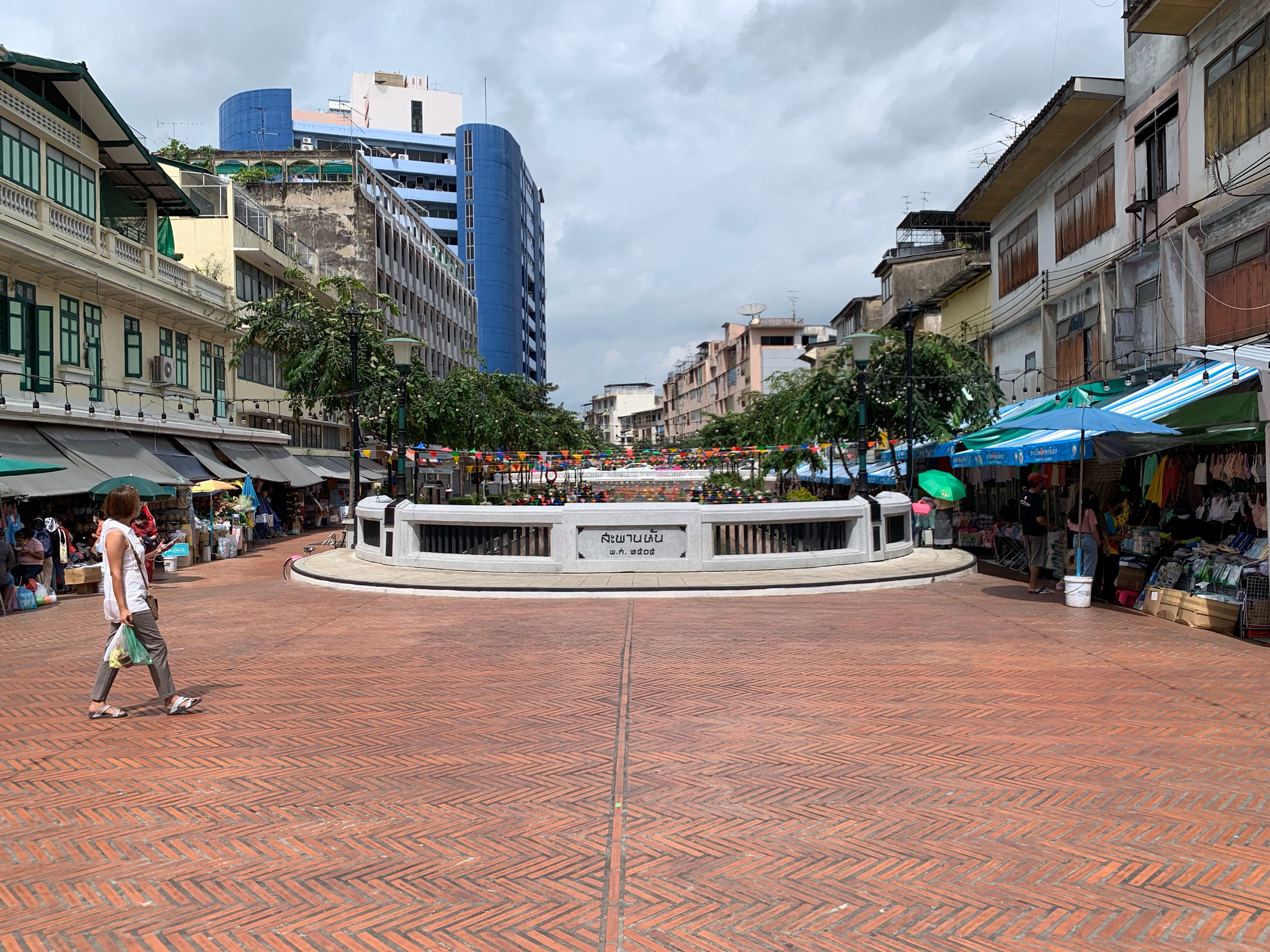
Saphan Han

Saphan Han (Thai: สะพานหัน, pronounced [sā.pʰāːn hǎn]) is a small bridge over Khlong Rop Krung (also known as Khlong Ong Ang), located in Bangkok's Chakkrawat sub-district, Samphanthawong district, and Wang Burapha Phirom sub-district, Phra Nakhon district. The name also refers to the surrounding area.

The bridge was built along with the excavation of Khlong Rop Krung at the beginning of the Rattanakosin period, during the reign of King Phutthayotfa Chulalok (Rama I). At that time, Saphan Han was a single wooden plank laid across the canal to connect the outer city with the inner city. One end was fixed, while the other rested freely on the opposite side, allowing it to be moved aside to let boats pass. This design gave the bridge its name; Saphan Han, meaning "turning bridge" or "swing bridge."

In the Ayutthaya period, similar bridges were noted at Khlong Takhian and Khlong Wat Yai Chai Mongkhon, assumed to be near Wat Yai Chai Mongkhon temple based on its name. This type of movable bridge was once a common sight in both Bangkok and other provinces.

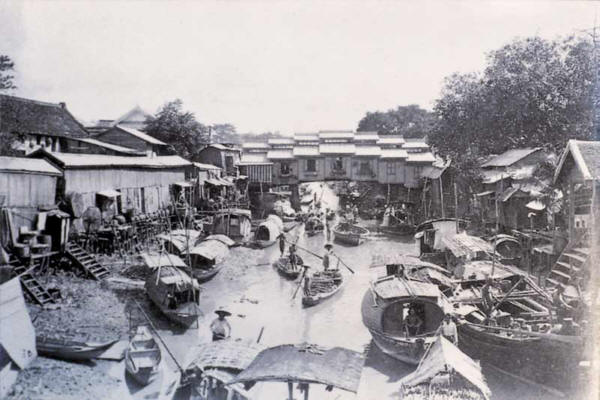
Saphan Han in Chulalongkorn's reign

Later in the reign of King Phutthaloetla Naphalai (Rama II), when Saphan Han was in poor shape, it was rebuilt with two planks, though it could no longer turn as it once did. During the reign of King Mongkut (Rama IV), a steel frame was added, and the bridge floor remained movable with the aid of a pulley system to allow boats to pass through.

In the reign of King Chulalongkorn (Rama V), it was rebuilt as a corridor-style wooden bridge about 1.5 m (4 ft 11 in) wide. The interior was divided into small rooms used as shops. The design was modeled after the Rialto Bridge in Venice and the Ponte Vecchio in Florence, both historic bridges in Italy. There were also footpaths and small shophouses along each side of the canal, making the area a bustling trade centre.

It became one of the most photographed bridges in Bangkok. The bridge retained its small room structures at least until the early reign of King Ananda Mahidol (Rama VIII) about 1934–1935. The present-day Saphan Han is a reinforced concrete structure built in 1962, but the name has been preserved to commemorate the original bridge.

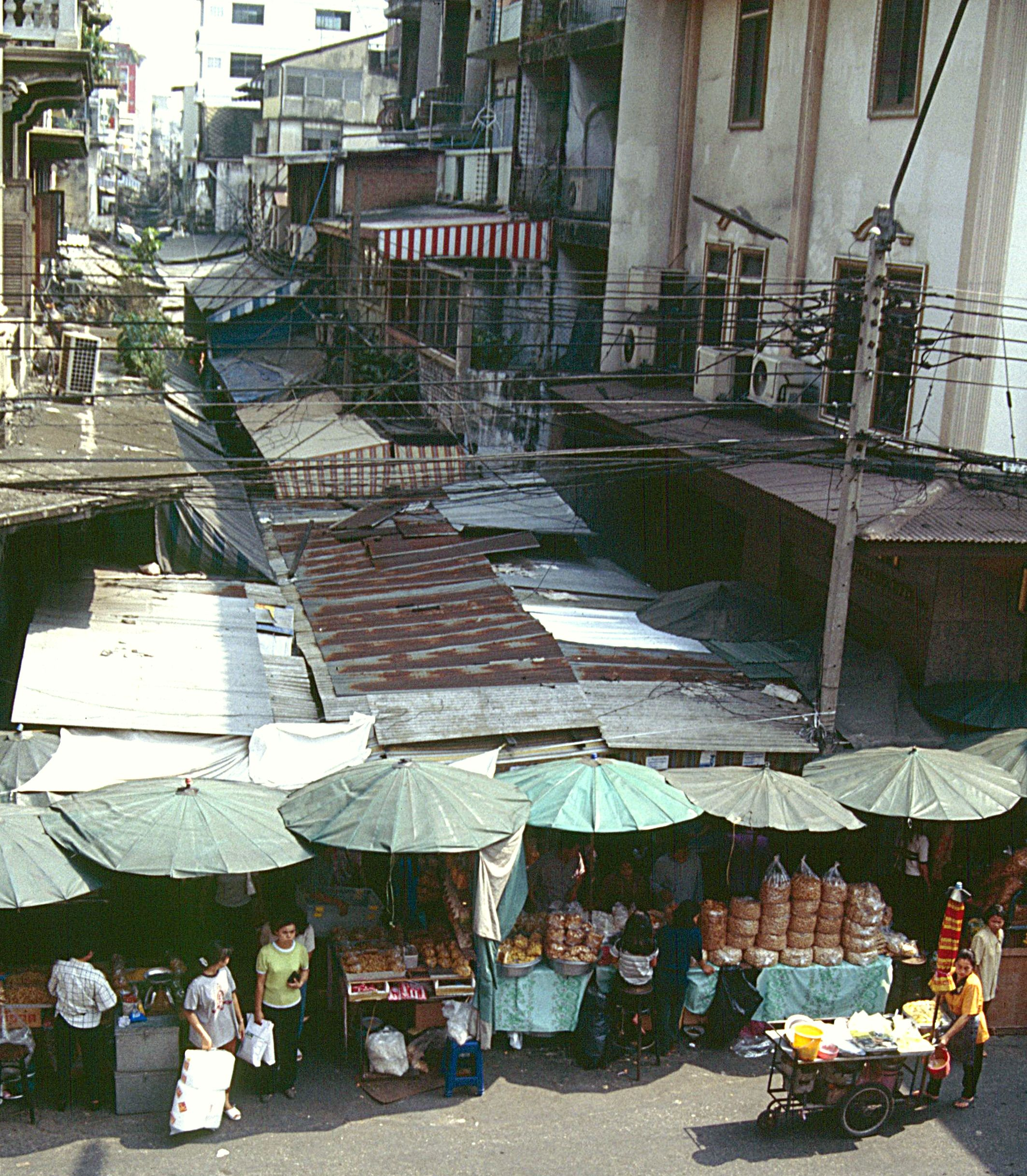
The entrance to Saphan Han on the Phahurat side, around the 1990s

During the reigns of King Mongkut and King Chulalongkorn, Saphan Han was considered one of the most important and bustling shopping districts of Bangkok. It was located at the edge of Chinatown, where Yaowarat served as the main artery, and directly opposite the Little India or Phahurat neighbourhood, the residence of the Indian community in Thailand. At that time, the area was full of commercial activity. There were shops selling imported fruits, canned foods, chewing tobacco, and herbal remedies, alongside establishments that were illegal or deemed immoral, such as gambling houses, opium dens, and brothels. It was also close to many other commercial districts, such as Saphan Lek, Wang Burapha, and Thieves' Market, also known locally as Woeng Nakhon Khasem.

Today, Saphan Han remains a busy shopping area much like in the past. The shops are mostly shophouses, offering a wide variety of goods such as clothing, fresh and dried foods, fruits, kitchenware, children's toys, cosmetics, buttons, fabrics, textiles, and mainly ladies' items. It is considered the end of Sampheng, or officially Soi Wanit 1, a long narrow lane stretching from the heart of Yaowarat. Sampheng is divided into three sections. The first section begins from Song Sawat Road near Song Wat Road, and ends at Ratchawong Road near Ratchawong Pier. The second section starts from Ratchawong Road and ends at Chakkrawat Road near the Wat Tuek Intersection. The third section continues from Chakkrawat Road, crosses Saphan Han, and terminates at Chak Phet Road opposite Phahurat. This last part is also known as "Trok Hua Med." (ตรอกหัวเม็ด, [trɔ̀ːk hǔa mét]) (Note: Trok Hua Med (literally "alley of the rivet") likely derives its name from the alley's position at one end of the old Saphan Han swing bridge, where a rivet or pivot point may once have anchored the bridge's turning mechanism. The name reflects the mechanical structure of the historical wooden swing bridge.) Despite being only a narrow and crowded lane, it is home to two Chinese shrines: the Pung Tao Kong Shrine and the Chun Sieng Chow Sue Shrine.

Since October 2015, the Thai government has pursued a policy to improve the scenery around Khlong Rop Krung and Khlong Ong Ang. This included renovations of five consecutive bridges: Saphan Lek, Bhanubandhu Bridge, Saphan Han, Borphitphimuk Bridge, and Osathanond Bridge, the last of which stands near the base of Phra Pok Klao Bridge crossing to the Thonburi side. The redevelopment required the demolition of many shophouses that had long lined the canals, such as those found in Saphan Lek, Khlong Thom, and Saphan Han. When the canal-side stores were removed, Saphan Han was fully visible for the first time in over 40 years.

== See also ==
- Saphan Lek
- Khlong Thom
- Saphan Hok
