= Wat Chai Chana Songkhram, Bangkok =

Wat Chai Chana Songkhram
- วัดชัยชนะสงคราม
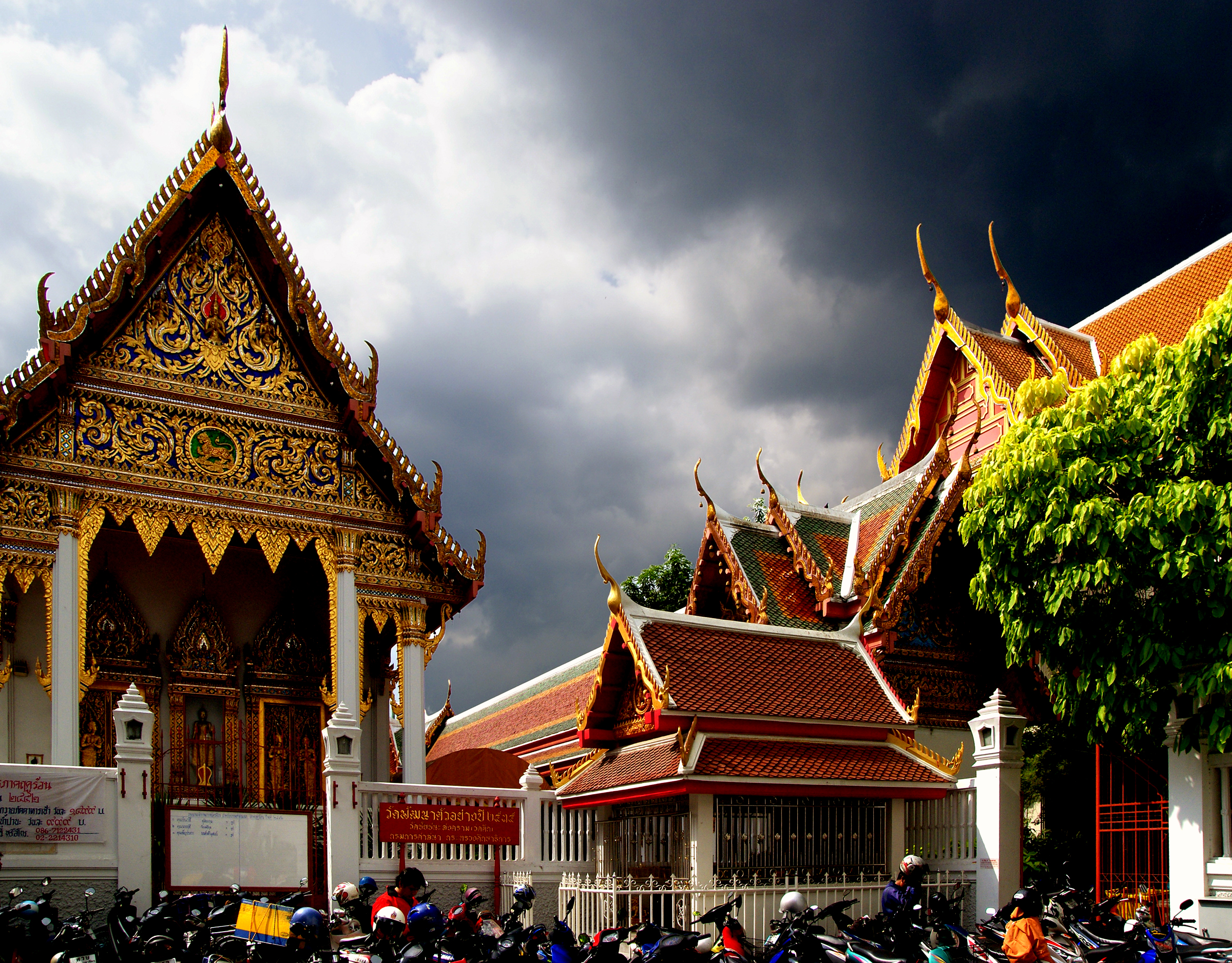
- Main hall

- Location within Thailand

Religion
- Affiliation: Buddhism (Theravāda: Mahā Nikāya)
- Province: Bangkok
- Region: central Thailand
- Status: Third class royal temple

Location
- Location: 83 Maha Chak Rd, Samphanthawong, Samphanthawong
- Country: Thailand
- Interactive map of Wat Chai Chana Songkhram
- Coordinates: 13.744774°N 100.505636°E

Architecture
- Type: Wat
- Style: Thai
- Founder: Chao Phraya Bodindecha
- Completed: 1848

Wat Chai Chana Songkhram, or written as Wat Chaichana Songkhram (Thai: วัดชัยชนะสงคราม) is a Thai Buddhist temple located in the area of Khlong Thom not far from Chinatown, or popularly known as Yaowarat.

It is regarded as the third class of the royal temple, that was built during King Nangklao (Rama III)'s reign in 1848. The chief commander, Chao Phraya Bodindecha, was a devout follower of Buddhism. After coming back with the victory from the war with Khmer and Annamese, he donated his house to build this temple. He named this temple Wat Chai Chana Songkhram, which means literally "war victory temple".

This temple is also known informally as Wat Tuek (วัดตึก), which means literally "building temple". Because it is strange from other temples at the same time, it was built with concrete and full of buildings and structures, such as main hall, stūpas, sermon hall, monk's dwellings etc.

The principal Buddha image named "Singhamunin Thammabodin Lokanartthewanorachat Apiphuchani" (สิงหมุนินทร์ ธรรมบดินทร์ โลกนาถเทวนรชาติ อภิปูชนีย์).

Wat Chai Chana Songkhram can be considered as the only monastery in the Khlong Thom's area, the automotive hardware and electric equipment market is crowded with a lot of people, especially on Saturdays and Sundays.
