= Chakkrawat =

Coordinates: 13°44′21.2″N 100°30′08.6″E

Chakkrawat จักรวรรดิ
- Khwaeng
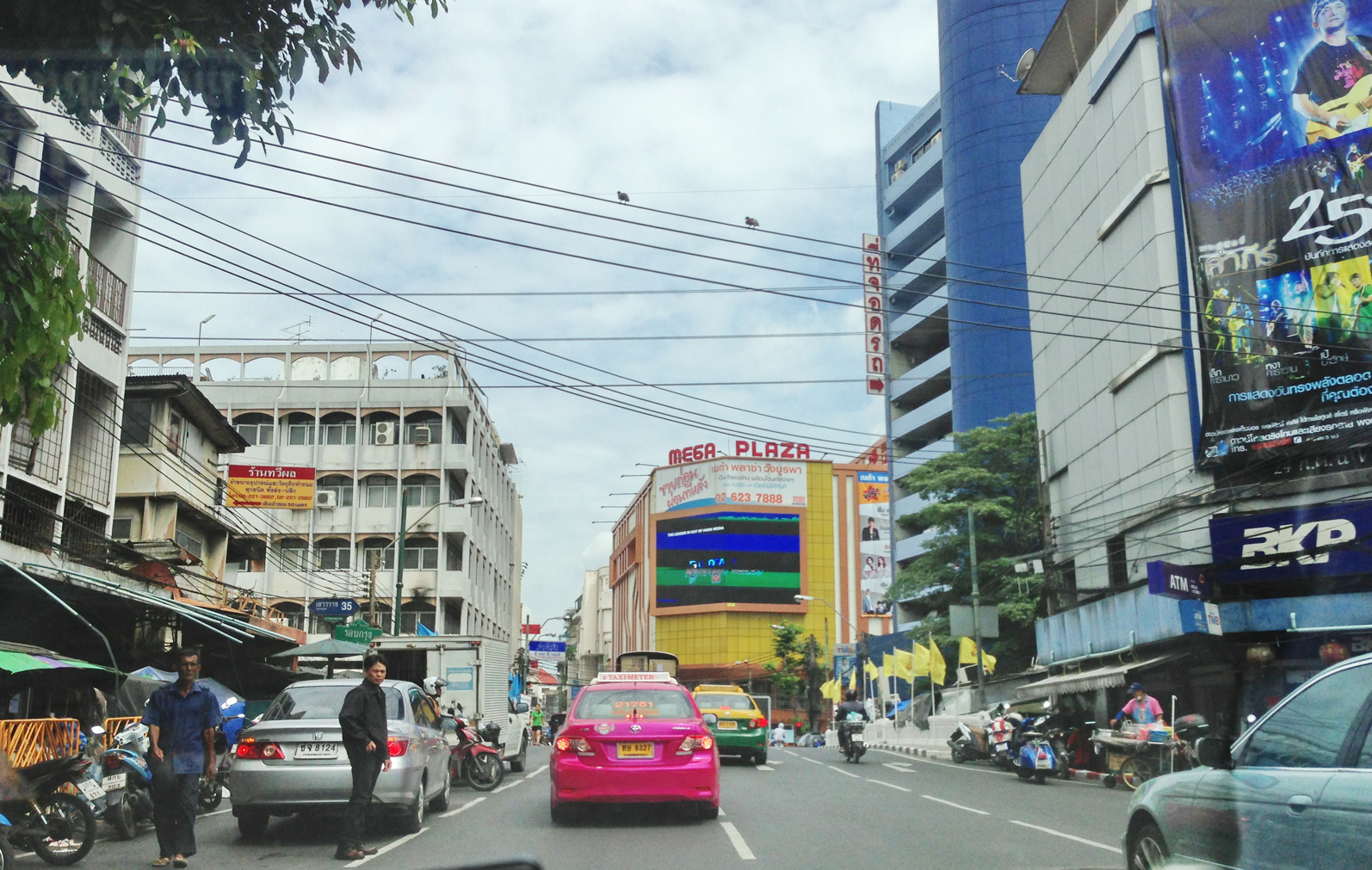
- Final stretch of Yaowarat road toward Wang Burapha (the left side is the alley to Saphan Han)

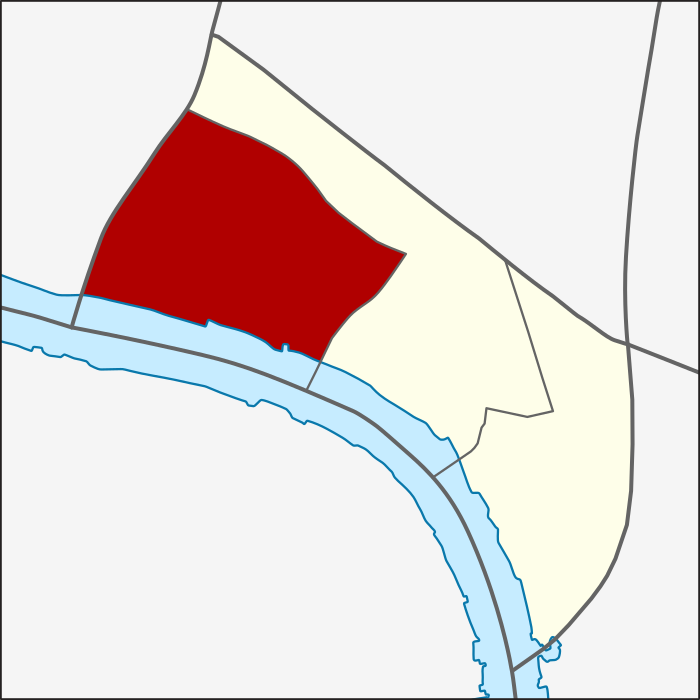
- Location in Samphanthawong District
- Country: Thailand
- Province: Bangkok
- Khet: Samphanthawong

Area
  - Total: 0.484 km^{2} (0.187 sq mi)

Population (2020)
  - Total: 6,461
- Time zone: UTC+7 (ICT)
- Postal code: 10100
- TIS 1099: 101301

Chakkrawat (Thai: จักรวรรดิ, pronounced [tɕàk.krā.wàt]) is a khwaeng (subdistrict) of Samphanthawong district, Bangkok.

== History ==
In 1915, corresponding to the King Vajiravudh (Rama VI)'s reign. Chakkrawat was an amphoe (district) of Phra Nakhon province, same as Sam Yaek, Sampheng, and Samphanthawong.

Later in 1931, during the King Prajadhipok (Rama VII)'s reign. The economic downturn, the Siamese government therefore has to save the nation's budget. Therefore had to merge the Chakkrawat and Sampeng together with Samphanthawong since then.

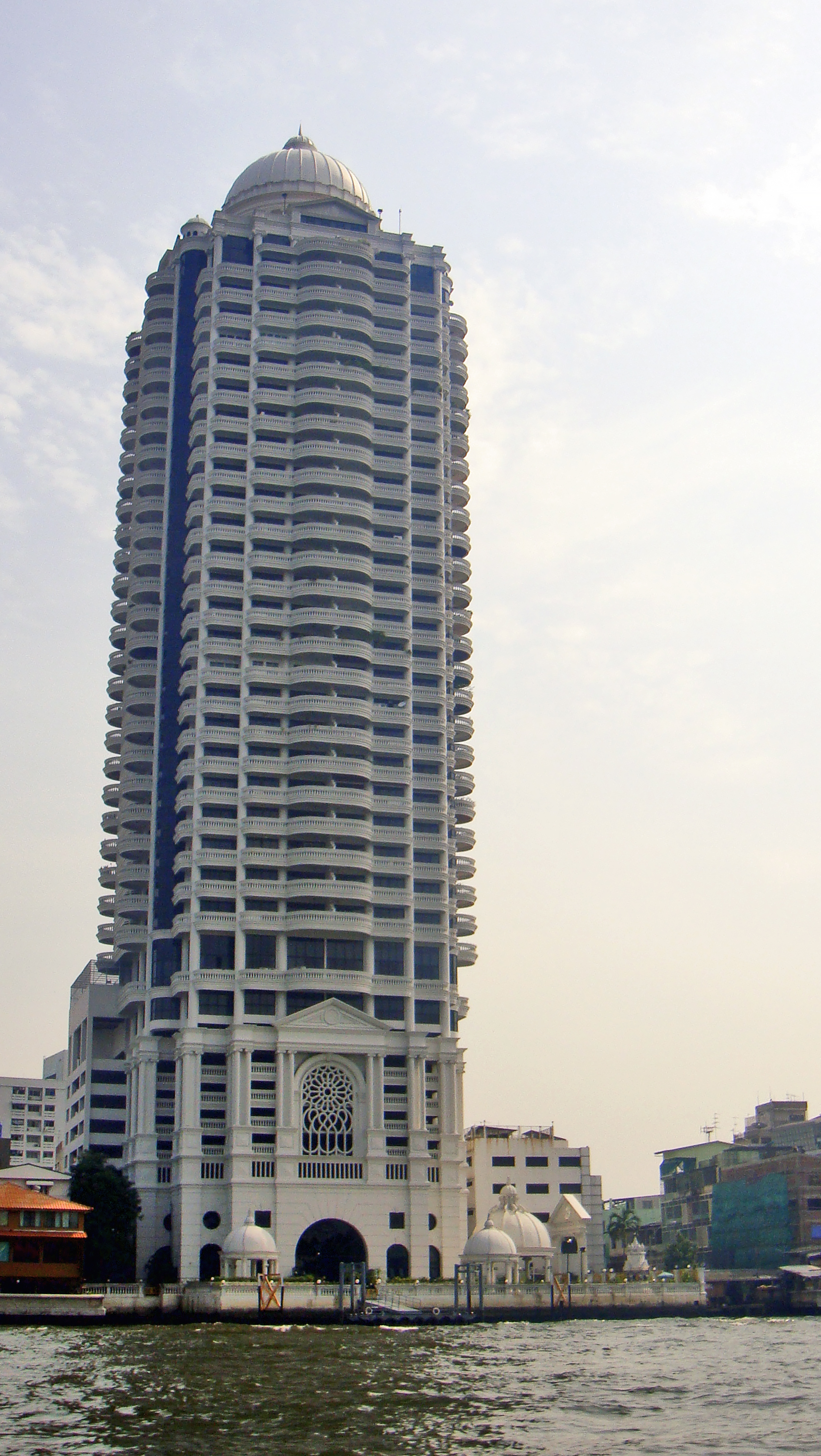
Bangkok River Park, a high-rise condominium in the area on the Chao Phraya river

Until 1973, Bangkok Metropolitan Administration (BMA) was officially established. Samphanthawong therefore changed the status to a full district and Chakkrawat officially changed its status to a subdistrict of Samphanthawong.

Its name after Wat Chakkrawat, an old temple dates back to the Ayutthaya period, or formerly known as "Wat Sam Pluem" which located in this area.

== Geography ==
Chakkrawat considered as the northwest part of the district. The west side of the subdistrict adjacent to the Chao Phraya river throughout the area.

Neighbouring subdistricts are (from north clockwise): Samphanthawong in its district (Yaowarat and Yaowaphanit roads are the borderlines), Somdet Chao Phraya and Khlong San of Khlong San (across Chao Phraya river), Wang Burapha Phirom of Phra Nakhon (Khlong Rop Krung is a borderline).

Chakkrawat and Yaowarat with Ratchawong roads are the main thoroughfares. For Chakkrawat is a short road with a length of only 1 km (0.62 mi) and has one-way traffic management, starting from S.A.B. intersection, ran to the southwest through Wat Tuek intersection before ending at the foot of Phra Pok Klao bridge nearby.

== Demography ==
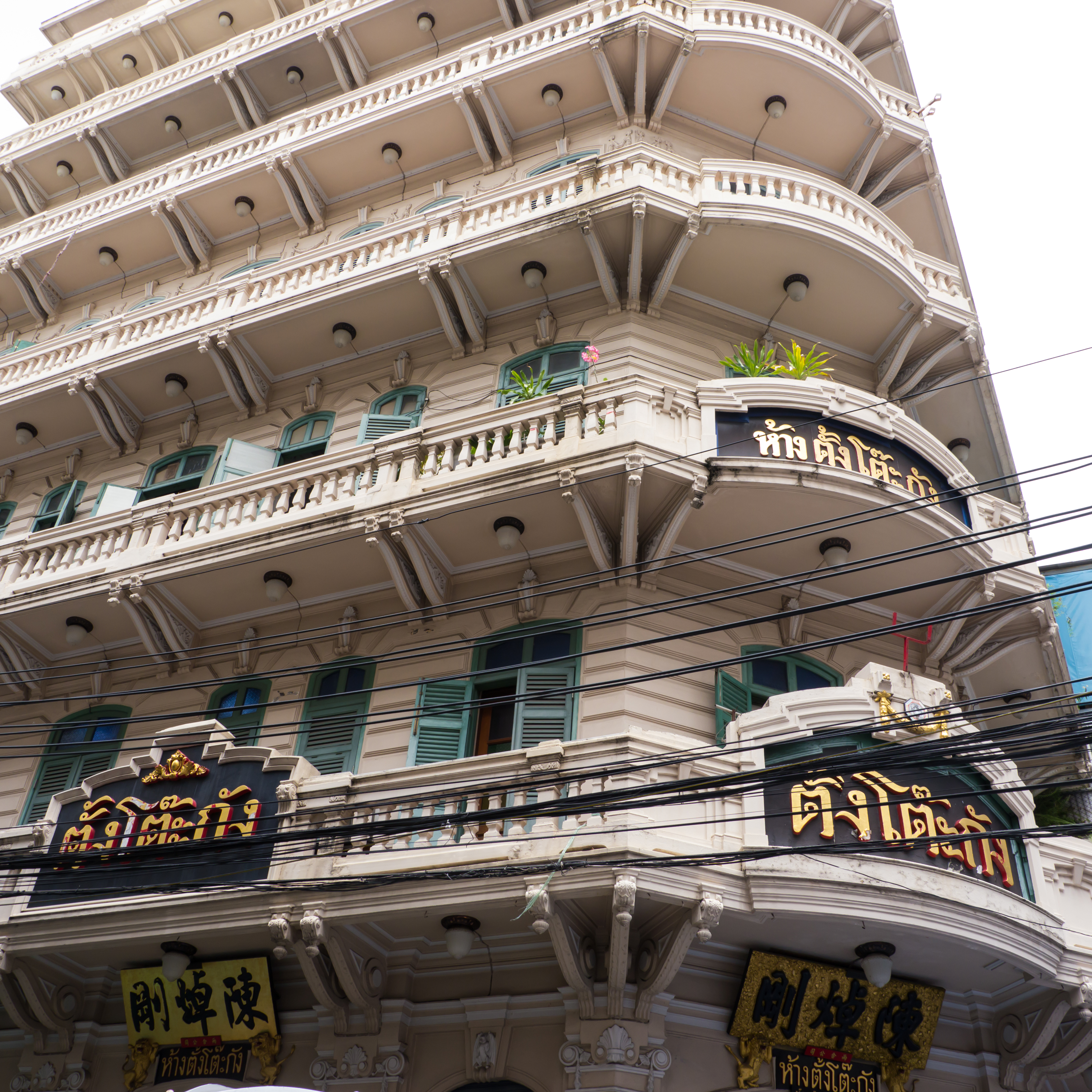
Building of Tang Toh Kang, the first and oldest gold shop in Thailand

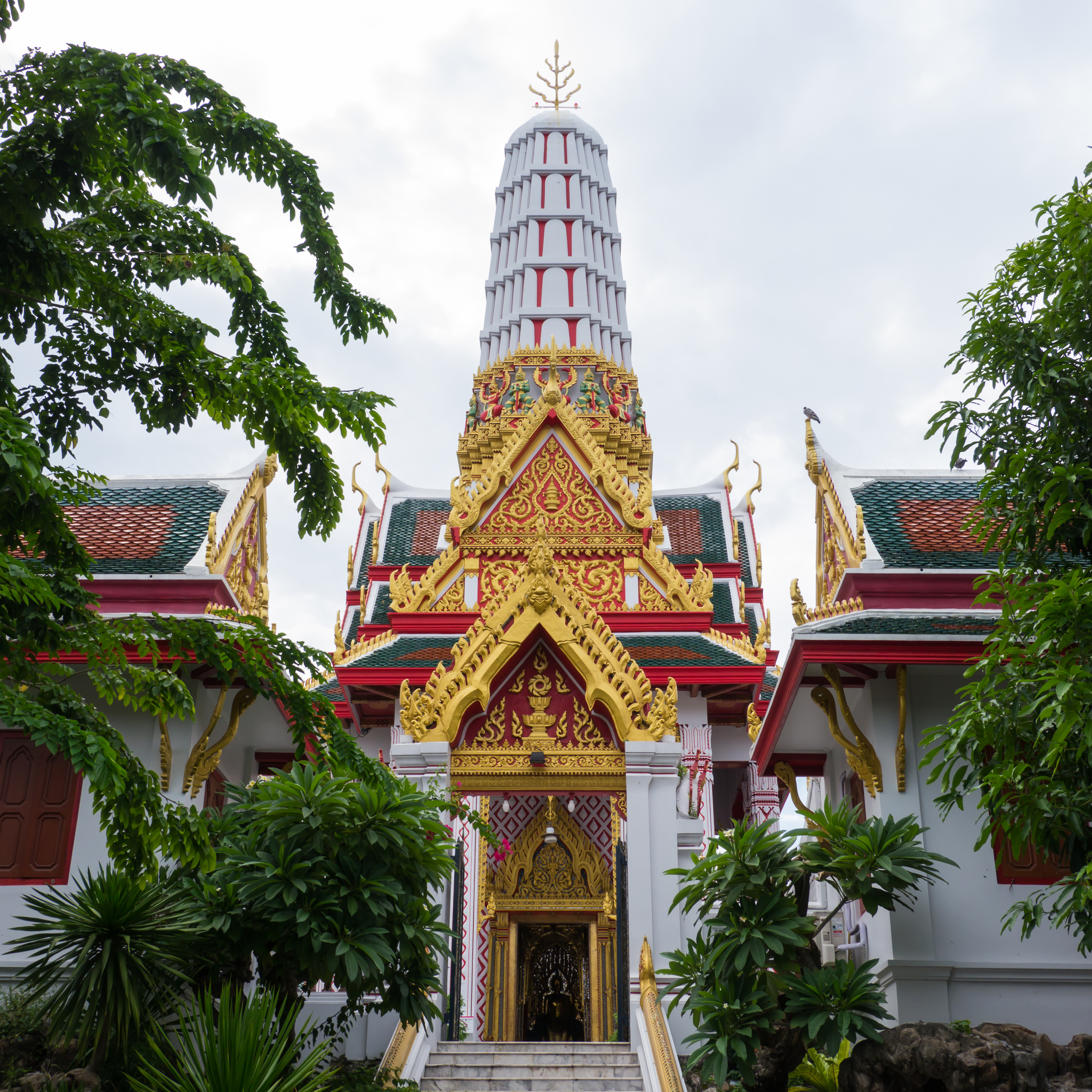
Prang (pagoda in Khmer-style) of Wat Chakkrawat, the origin of the area's name

In 2017, Chakkrawat had a total of 7,529 people (3,699 men, 3,830 women) in 5,037 households.

== Places ==
- Wat Chakkrawat
- Wat Bophit Phimuk
- Rajamangala University of Technology Rattanakosin Bophit Phimuk Chakkrawat Campus
- Song Wat Road
- Chakkrawat Metropolitan Police Station
- Ratchawong Pier
- Talat Kao (Old Market)
- Guan Yu and Sek Tao Shrine
- Soi Wanit 1 (Sampheng)
- Bangkok Bank, Sampheng Branch
- Tang Toh Kang Gold Shop
- Saphan Han
- Peiing Public School
- Wat Lokanukroh
- Bangkok River Park
- Khlong Thom
