= Thieves' Market =

Market in Bangkok

Coordinates: 13.7453°N 100.5045°E

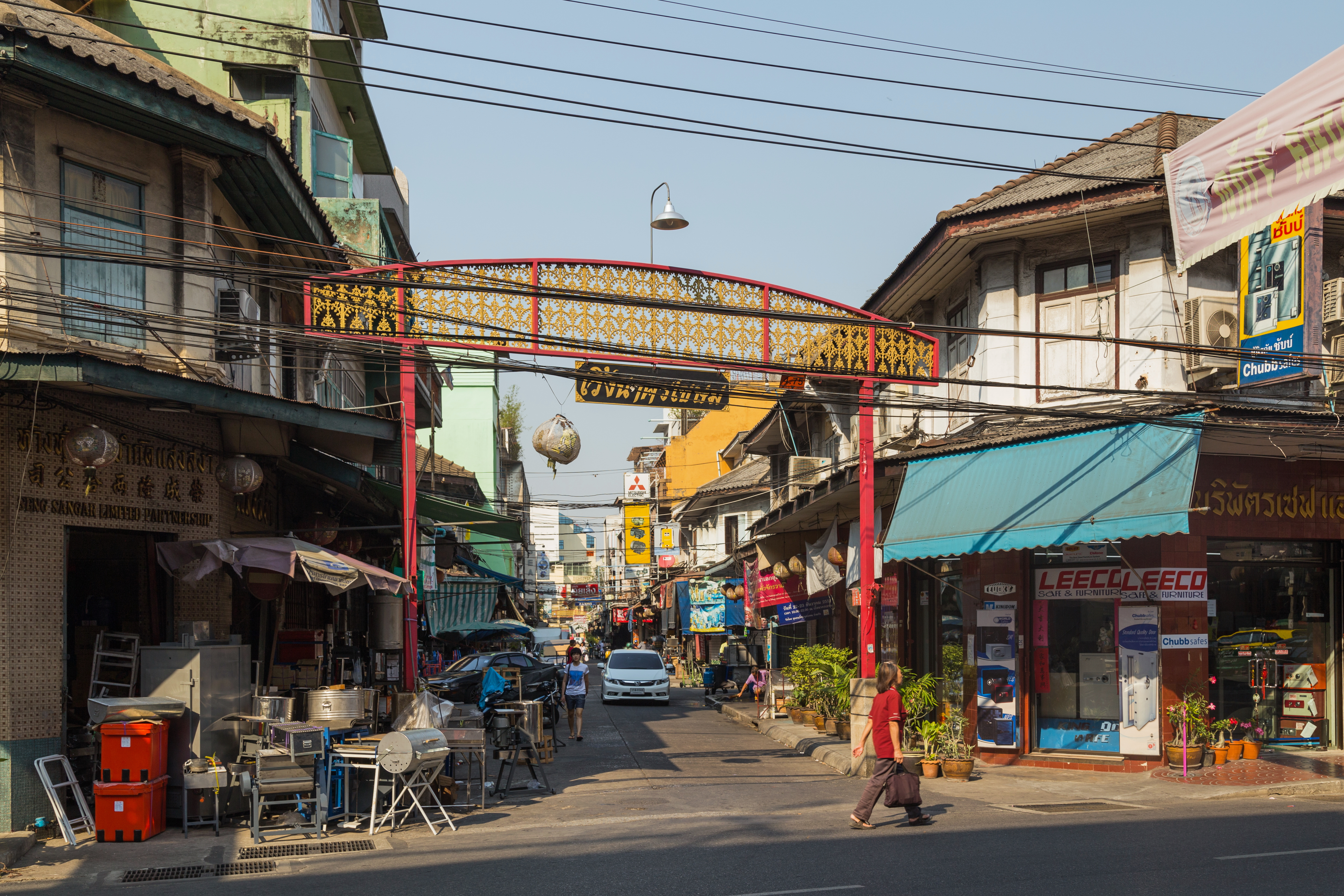
The gate of the Woeng Nakhon Khasem on Charoen Krung side in 2016

Woeng Nakhon Khasem (Thai: เวิ้งนาครเขษม, pronounced [wɤ́ːŋ nāː.kʰɔ̄ːn kʰā.sěːm]) is a market in the Samphanthawong District, Bangkok, Thailand. It is popularly known as the "Thieves' Market", as it was once a place where mostly stolen goods were sold. The market is surrounded by Charoen Krung, Chakkrawat, Boriphat, and Yaowarat Roads in the area near the foot of Damrong Sathit Bridge (Saphan Lek), close to Wang Burapha and Khlong Thom. The name "Woeng Nakhon Khasem" literally translates to "delightful townspeople alcove".

Woeng Nakhon Khasem is regarded as Bangkok's first full-service shopping district. It was developed during the reign of King Chulalongkorn (Rama V), who bestowed the land to Prince Paribatra Sukhumbandhu. In 1905, it became the site of Siam's first cinema, operated by the Japanese and housed in a temporary zinc-roofed building.

Over time, Woeng Nakhon Khasem became a well-known market for imitation antiques, vintage furniture, brassware, records, and musical instruments.

Talat Pi Raka (ตลาดปีระกา), meaning "Year of the Rooster Market", was a daily sub-market located within the area. It sold both fresh and dried foods and was once home to a renowned beef noodle shop.

Since 2012, the Paribatra estate announced plans to sell Woeng Nakhon Khasem. Ownership has since transferred to the Thai Charoen Corporation (TCC Group), owned by Charoen Sirivadhanabhakdi, which plans to redevelop the area for commercial purposes. The 440 tenants will have to relocate to make way for the project; many shops have already closed, and signs on their doors now indicate their new locations.

From Tuesday to Sunday nights, in front of the buildings of Sang Thong Machinery Limited Partnership near Wat Tuek Intersection, the area hosts a popular street food stall named "Khao Phad Pu Chang Phueak", or simply "Weng", serving crab fried rice, Hong Kong-style fried noodles, and stir-fried fish maw with shark's fin soup. The stall was awarded Bib Gourmand by the Michelin Guide in both 2019 and 2020.
