= Wat Chakkrawat =

Buddhist temple in Bangkok, Thailand

- วัดจักรวรรดิราชาวาส
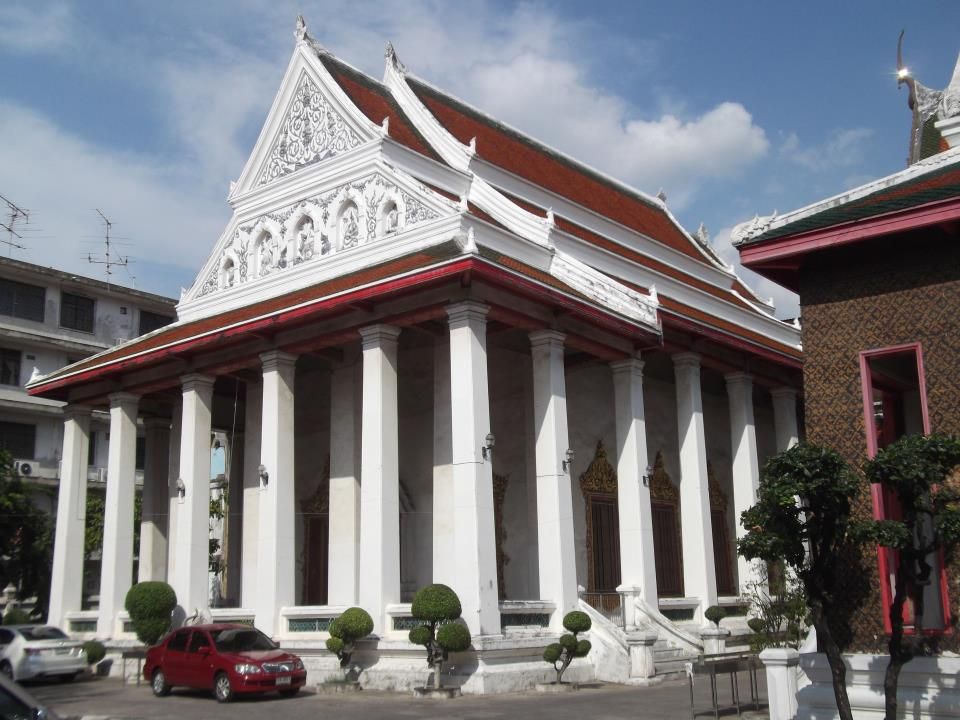

- Location within Bangkok

Religion
- Affiliation: Buddhism

Location
- Location: Chakkrawat, Samphanthawong, Bangkok
- Country: Thailand
- Interactive map of Wat Chakkrawat
- Coordinates: 13.7422°N 100.504158°E

Wat Chakkrawat (Thai: วัดจักรวรรดิ, pronounced [wát tɕàk.krā.wàt]) or full name Wat Chakkrawat Rachawat Woramahawihan (Thai: วัดจักรวรรดิราชาวาสวรมหาวิหาร, [wát tɕàk.krā.wàt rāː.tɕʰāː.wâːt wɔː.ráʔ.mā.hǎː.wíʔ.hǎːn]) is a Buddhist monastery in Bangkok.

Considered to be another Thai temple located in Bangkok's Chinatown apart from the notable Wat Traimit, where the largest gold Buddha statue in the world is housed. The monastery is in the northwestern edge of Samphanthawong district near the Chao Phraya river.

Formerly known as Wat Sam Pluem (Thai: วัดสามปลื้ม), it is an old temple that was here long before the Yaowarat road was cut in 1892. Its history goes back at least 200 years, from the reign of King Buddha Yodfa Chulalok (Rama I), coinciding with the establishment of Rattanakosin kingdom (now Bangkok) as the new capital of Siam (Thailand in those days) in 1782. At that time the location of the temple called Sampheng, and became the residence of Chinese immigrants after they shifted from Tha Tian quarter. Because the king needs this area to build what is now the Grand Palace.

In the reign of King Nangklao (Rama III), Chaophraya Bodindecha renovated the entire temple and dug a khlong (canal) to convey the water from the temple's pond. The restoration took six years to complete. Monks from the other temples were invited to stay here, and then the temple was presented to the king to make it a royal temple in 1825.

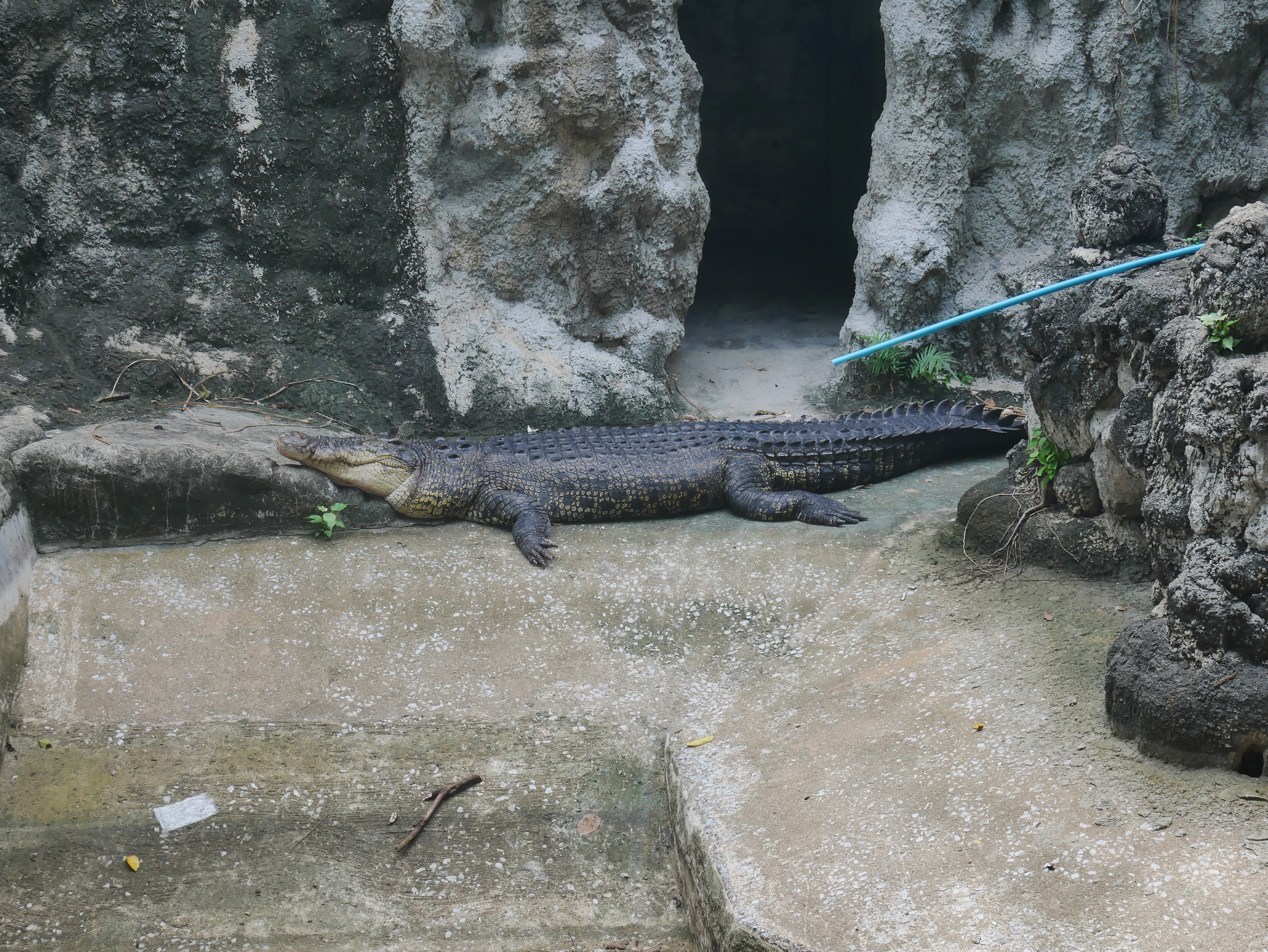
Crocodile in the temple pond

Later, a Buddha statue named Phra Bang was enshrined in the vihara (sanctuary). When the King Nangklao visited the temple for the royal kathin rope ceremony, the king mentioned that the vihara was higher than the ubosot (ordination hall). Chaopraya Bodindecha then built a new the ubosot and changed the old ubosot to be a vihara. In the reign of King Mongkut (Rama IV), Phra Bang was sent back to Luang Phrabang in Kingdom of Luang Phrabang (now Laos) until the present, and Phra Nak was brought from Buddhist shrine inside the Grand Palace to replace the statue.

In the contemporary era with World War II, in the Chao Phraya river near the temple there was a large crocodile went on a rampage as a man-eater. It was said that it was one-eyed crocodile, so people dubbed it I-bord Wat Sam Pluem ("the blind of Wat Sam Pluem"). Its story was well known and greatly feared by the Bangkokian at that time. A chase was launched but they were unable to capture it. Until a monk from Wat Chakkrawat caught and raised it in a pond at the temple until it died naturally. I-bord was rumored to be a haunted crocodile. The crocodile pond still exists in the temple today.
