= Kamron Samboonnanon =

Thai actor

- คำรณ สัมบุญณานนท์
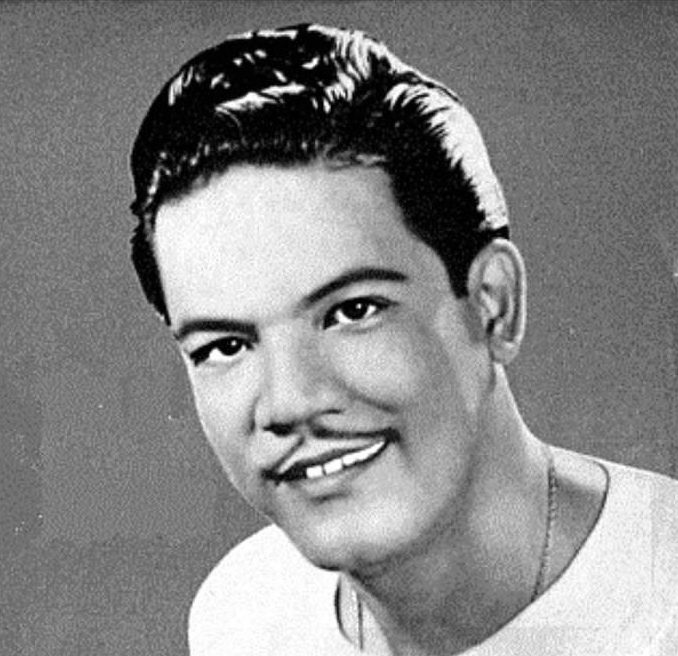
- Kamron in 1945
- Born: 7 January 1920; Sampanthawong, Bangkok, Thailand
- Died: 30 September 1969 (aged 49); Nonthaburi, Thailand
- Other name: Father of Thai Country Music
- Occupations: Singer-songwriter; actor
- Musical career
- Genres: Luk Thung; music for life
- Years active: 1938–1969

Kamron Samboonnanon (Thai: คำรณ สัมบุญณานนท์, 7 January 1920 – 30 September 1969) was a musician and actor born in Sampanthawong. Some dispute this, claiming he was born in Suphanburi after analyzing his accent. He graduated from Chang Korsang Utentawai School. He had many popular songs, such as Political mantra, Tasikumsorn, Oder Father, Life of farmhouse and more.

Kamron first came to prominence after performing "The Farmer's Bride" in a 1938 radio drama. This song has been largely considered the premier song in Thai country music and Kamron has been praised as "Father of Thai Country Music".

Kamron was outspoken against the establishment and the inequities of Thai politics which lead to his performances being halted by authorities and even lead to his arrest.

The height of his career was from 1946–1963. His popularity allowed him to lead a comfortable life. Later, he became addicted to drugs and eventually succumbed to them, dying in 1969.

He published 139 songs in total, primarily dealing with politics, buddhism, and life of the poor working class. His style became the blueprint for modern Luk Thung.
