= Wat Tuek, Bangkok =

Coordinates: 13°44′38.99″N 100°30′16.05″E

Wat Tuek
- วัดตึก
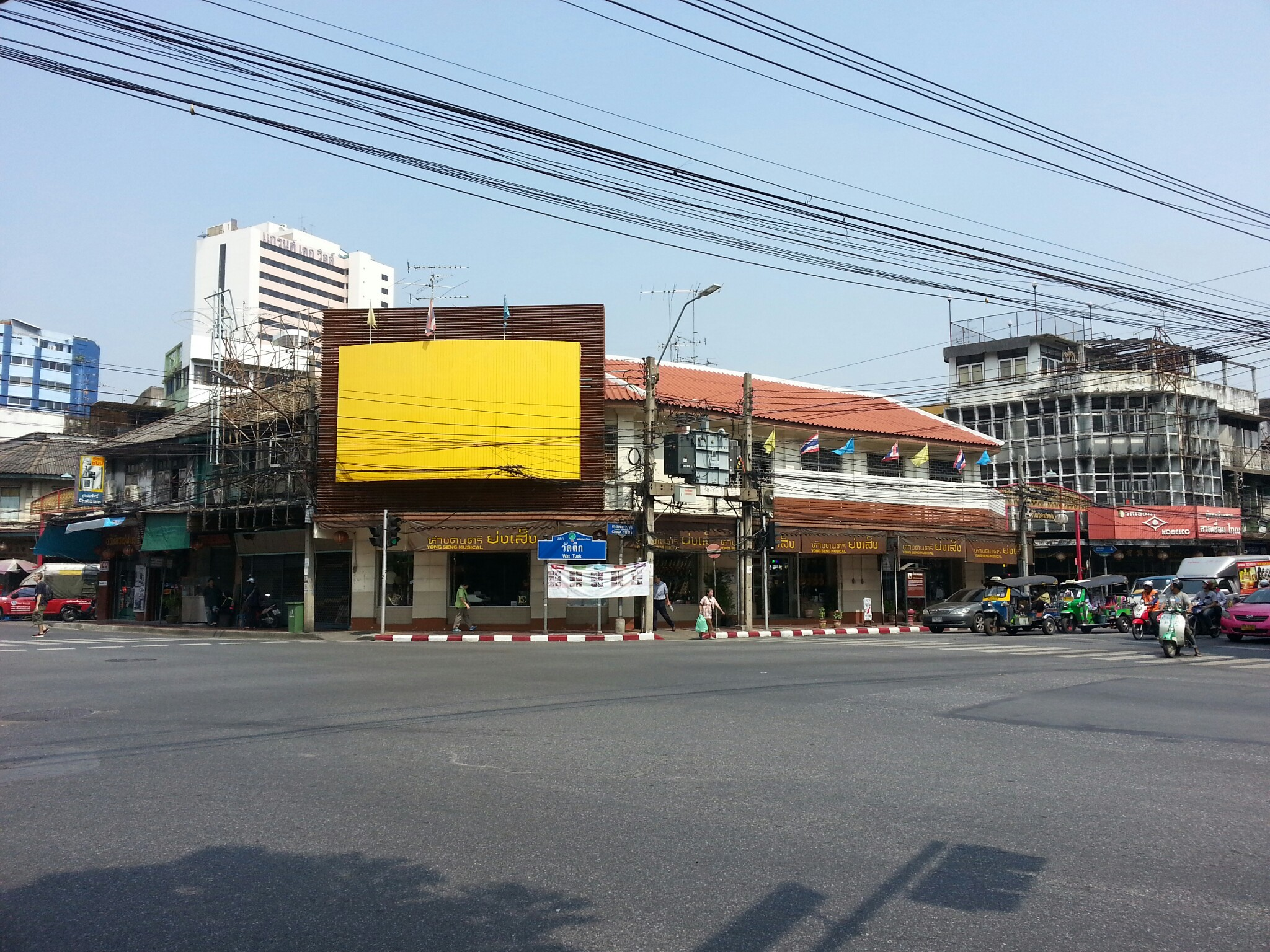
- Wat Tuek Intersection on February 24, 2015 (seen from Yaowarat Road)

Location
- Samphanthawong, Chakkrawat, Samphanthawong, Bangkok, Thailand
- Roads at junction: Yaowarat (north–south); Chakkrawat (east–west)

Construction
- Type: Four-way at-grade intersection

Wat Tuek (Thai: วัดตึก, pronounced [wát tɯ̀k]) is a four-way intersection located in Samphanthawong and Chakkrawat Subdistricts of Bangkok's Samphanthawong District, where Yaowarat Road meets Chakkrawat Road. It marks the far end of Yaowarat Road, better known as Bangkok's Chinatown. Yaowarat Road is about 1.5 km (0.93 mi) long and is designated for one-way traffic. Starting from Odeon Circle, the road passes this intersection, crosses Khlong Rop Krung via Bhanubandhu Bridge, and ends at Merry Kings Intersection in front of Wang Burapha, in the Wang Burapha Phirom Subdistrict of Phra Nakhon District. S.A.B. Intersection lies parallel to this point on the Chakkrawat side, and the area is also close to Woeng Nakhon Khasem.

The name "Wat Tuek" means "Building Temple" and refers to Wat Chaichana Songkhram, a nearby temple in the Khlong Thom area. This temple was built by Chao Phraya Bodindecha, a nobleman during the reign of King Nangklao (Rama III), after returning victorious from war. Unlike other temples of its time, it was constructed with concrete and featured numerous buildings and structures, which was unusual at the time. This distinctive style led locals to nickname it "Wat Tuek", a name still used informally today.

Chakkrawat Road is a short, one-way road about 1 km (0.62 mi) in length. It begins at S.A.B. Intersection, runs southwest through Wat Tuek Intersection, and ends at the foot of Phra Pok Klao Bridge nearby.

In addition, in front of the Sang Thong Machinery Limited Partnership building in this area once stood the last tram stop in Bangkok and Thailand. Sadly, it was demolished on March 4, 2019, during the redevelopment of Woeng Nakhon Khasem, also known as the Thieves' Market.
