= Sampheng =

Neighborhood in Samphanthawong district, Bangkok, Thailand

Coordinates: 13°44′34.33″N 100°30′15.31″E

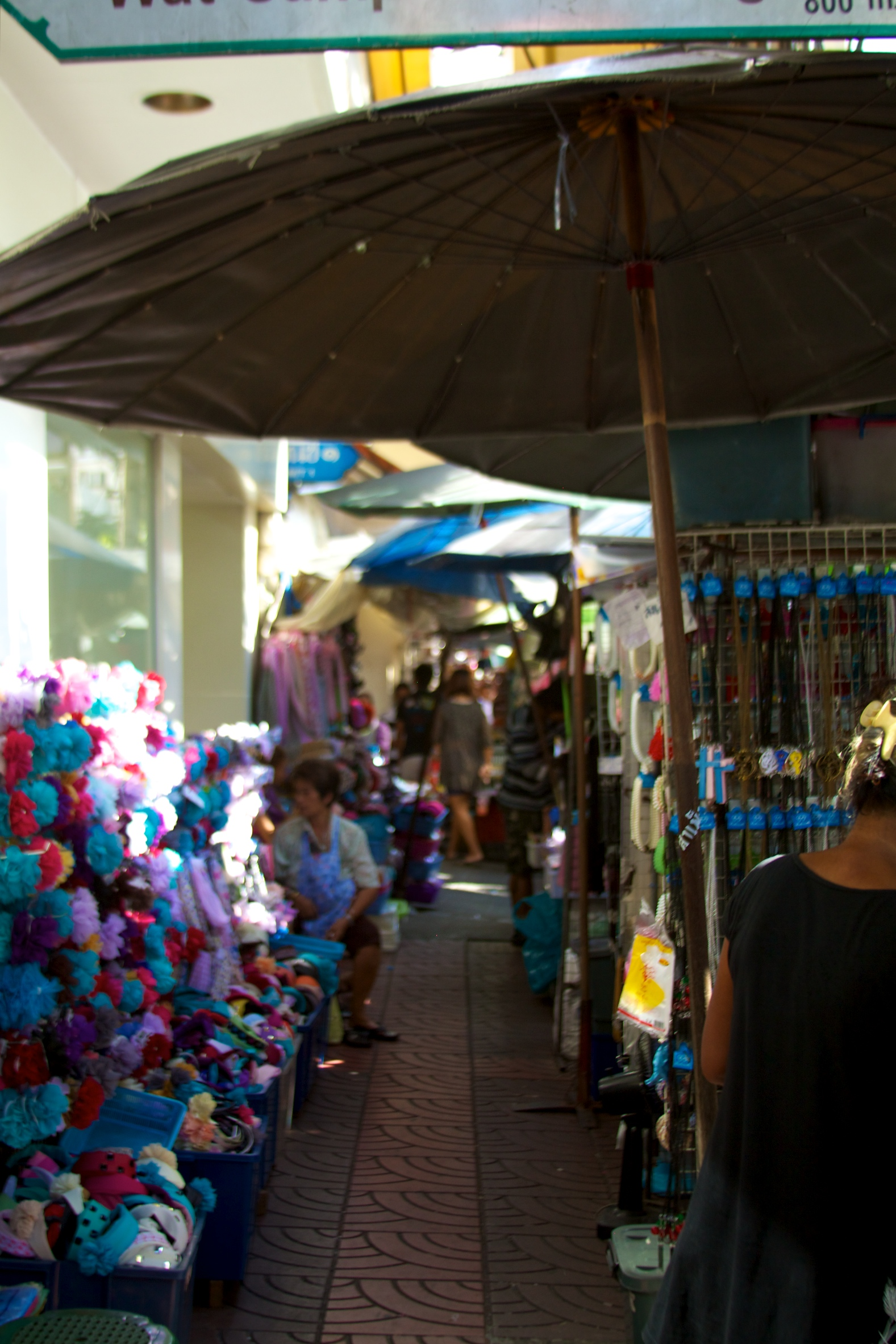
Sampheng wholesale market

Sampheng (Thai: สำเพ็ง, pronounced [sǎm.pʰēŋ]) is a historic neighbourhood and market in Bangkok's Chinatown, in Samphanthawong District. It was settled during the establishment of Bangkok in 1782 by Teochew Chinese, and eventually grew into the surrounding areas. The original street of Sampheng, now officially known as Soi Wanit 1 (ซอยวานิช 1), is now a small alleyway lined with numerous shops, and is a famous market.

== Toponymy ==
Sampheng is named after a khlong (canal) that once ran through the area, connecting Khlong Maha Nak and the Chao Phraya River. It was filled in during the reign of King Rama VII to make way for roads, and the area became known as Khlong Thom ('filled canal'). The origin of the name "Sampheng" remains unclear. One speculation is that it may have been distorted from the word "Samphraeng" (สามแพร่ง), meaning "three-way junction", or the Teochew word 三平; Sānpíng. Another possibility is that it refers to a species of edible fern, "Lampheng" (ลำเพ็ง; Stenochlaena palustris), which used to be abundant in the area. However, according to historian Chit Phumisak, the name Sampheng is likely derived from the Peguan (Mon language) for "noble", suggesting that the area may have originally been inhabited by the Mon people before the Chinese.

== History ==
The area of Sampheng was settled in the reign of King Rama I. The king wished to build the Grand Palace in an area on the eastern bank of Chao Phraya River which was then occupied by a community of Teochew Chinese. On the king's wishes, the community was relocated down the river to the area that became Sampheng.

Initially, business in Sampheng consisted mostly imported good, with warehouses being built nearby. The area became very dense. During King Rama V's reign, the area saw three fires. After each fire, the King ordered the construction of a road through the damaged areas. The first was Sampheng Road, bridging Ratchawong Road and Trok Rong Krata (today's Yaowapanit Road). The second was cut straight to connect the bridge across the canal at Wat Pathum Khongkha and Yaowarat Road. The third linked Ratchawong and Chakkrawat Roads near Saphan Han and Phahurat quarters. The width of the road is 5 wa (10 meters).

Even though Sampheng Road is now officially known as Wanit 1 Road or Soi Wanit 1, it is more commonly referred to and known as Sampheng. It is a small alleyway lined with numerous shops, and is now Bangkok's premier wholesale market.

Mid-2019 news reports said that Sampheng's business was at its lowest level in 50 years. One trader said that business was down 70% from previous years, driving some shops to close. A similar downturn has afflicted other Bangkok markets like Pratunam and Bobae. Some have attributed the slowdown to weak domestic demand and the strength of the baht, but business volumes began to slump three to four years ago according to shop owners, well before the economy stalled and the baht appreciated. One economist, writing in the Bangkok Post, blames the rise of internet commerce for the decline.

== Operating hours ==
Sampheng is usually open 24/7, divided into two periods, day and night. During the day it is open from 08:00 to 17:00. At night, most shops are open from 23:00 but most customers come between 01:00 and 06:00.

== Merchandise ==
- Market stalls sell gift items, toys, stationery, clothing, footwear, fabrics, foodstuffs, and innumerable other items.

== See also ==
- Saphan Han
- Soi Lalai Sap
- Song Wat
- Tha Din Daeng
