= Saphan Lek =

Bridge in Bangkok, Thailand

Coordinates: 13°44′49″N 100°30′14″E

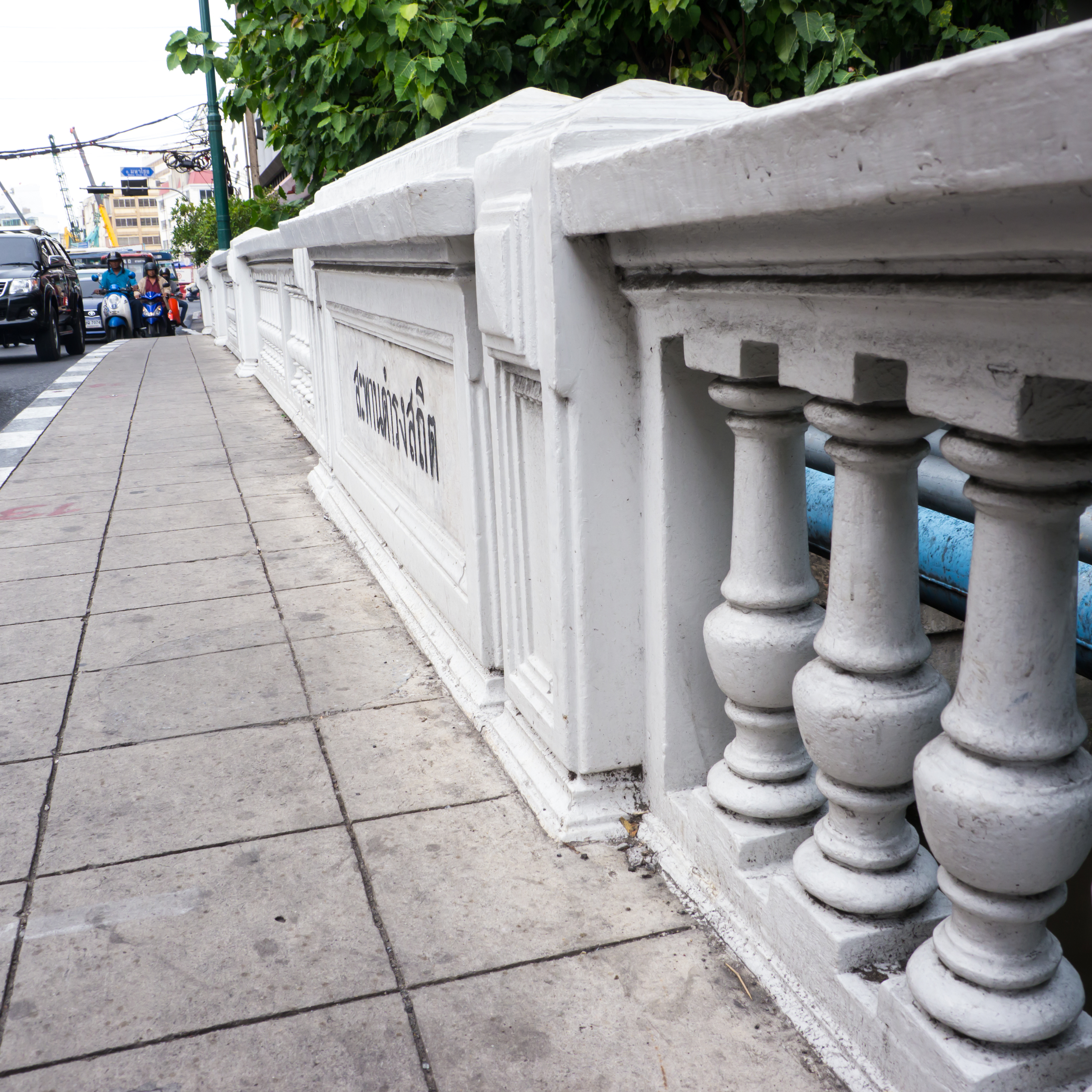
Saphan Lek or Damrong Sathit Bridge in 2014

Saphan Lek (Thai: สะพานเหล็ก, pronounced [sā.pʰāːn lèk], lit. 'Iron Bridge') is the name of a bridge and a now-extinct makeshift market near the bridge in Bangkok. Now officially known as Damrong Sathit Bridge (สะพานดำรงสถิต, [sā.pʰāːn dām.rōŋ sā.tʰìt]), the bridge was originally built to carry the Charoen Krung Road across Khlong Ong Ang during 1862–1864. It had a steel structure supporting a wooden floor, with an opening mechanism that allowed boats to pass. The bridge was rebuilt in 1900 under the supervision of Carlo Allegri, and named Damrong Sathit in honour of Prince Damrong Rajanubhab. It was yet again rebuilt with reinforced concrete in the reign of King Prajadhipok (Rama VII, 1925–1935), and is now a recognised ancient monument.

In the 1980s, the canal-side area south of the bridge became the site of a makeshift market selling video games, electronics and toys. Illegal structures were built that encroached over the canal entirely. In October 2015, the Bangkok Metropolitan Administration, in a bid to fight encroachment of public space, and with the support of the ruling military junta, successfully evicted the vendors/hawkers and demolished the structure.

In addition, Charoen Krung Road from the foot of Saphan Lek to Mo Mi Junction, there is a one-way traffic pattern and formed a boundary between Pom Prap Sattru Phai (left side) and Samphanthawong Districts (right side).

== History ==
The name of Saphan Lek bridge comes from the first Iron bridge that was built in the reign of king Rama V. The iron bridge which connects the Phra Nakhon District to the other side of the city is built across the Ong-ang canal to the Thonburi side of the island. The bridge was so famous during its early years that the area was commonly known as the Sapham lek district.

The bridge also had a pier area for the goods that were imported from other countries. The ships used to load off the imports on the pier. Many merchants would then come here to buy the goods so that they could sell it in other places. Hence, the bridge also had a significant commercial importance.

With time, the area gradually developed into a marketplace due to the imports coming from other countries. The merchants, vendors and hawkers built a marketplace illegally by covering the entire canal using iron plates for making the floor of the market. This caused the area to become a major marketplace, for a while, until the pier was closed by the city's development authority and the hawkers and market shop owners evicted from. Due to the large market that had developed, the police was unable to evict the merchants and shop owners from the area and the market was only closed by a policy/rule that the government passed.

== Government policy to demolish the market ==
In 2014 the government of Prayut Chan-o-cha created a new policy to deal with the Saphan Lek street hawkers and merchant who used the sidewalk of the district road to illegally set up their shops permanently. The government policy stated that the illegal hawkers and merchants along with their shops would have to move out of the area and establish in a government specified place before October 2015.

Initially, when the government announced the policy, it was widely protested. Merchants and hawkers refused to follow the policy and initiated a protest by deciding to not move to the locations specified by the government even after the time limit. On the other hand local people of the surrounding cities and towns agreed with the government policy as the shops set up by hawkers and merchants used to come in their way while using the public sidewalk and because some of the shops set up by the people had crossed the sidewalk and covered some portions of the road, causing regular traffic jams.

Following public support, the policy progressed slowly with only some of the shop owners and street hawker shifting to the place that the government had provided. When the time period given by the government finally came to an end in October 2015, the development authority started to bulldoze the marketplace on the sidewalk. After that the merchants and shop owners had no choice then to move to the government specified place, though some moved to the mall nearby, thus marking the end of the Saphan Lek market.

== Chinese archway ==
Since January 2024, a Chinese archway called "Vajirasathit 72 Phansa" has been installed at the foot of the bridge to celebrate the 72nd birthday of King Vajiralongkorn (Rama X), alongside another similar archway at Mo Mi Junction.
