= Samphanthawong district =

Samphanthawong สัมพันธวงศ์
- Khet

Other transcription(s)
  - Chinese: 三攀他翁 (Note: This is the most common transliteration adopted by Teochew-run organizations and businesses based in Thailand. It is generally transliterated to 三攀他旺, or much less commonly 三潘它翁, in Mandarin Chinese.); Sam-phang-tha-ong (Pe̍h-ūe-jī); Sam^{1}pang^{1}ta^{1}ong^{1} (Peng'im); Sānpāntāwēng (Hanyu Pinyin)
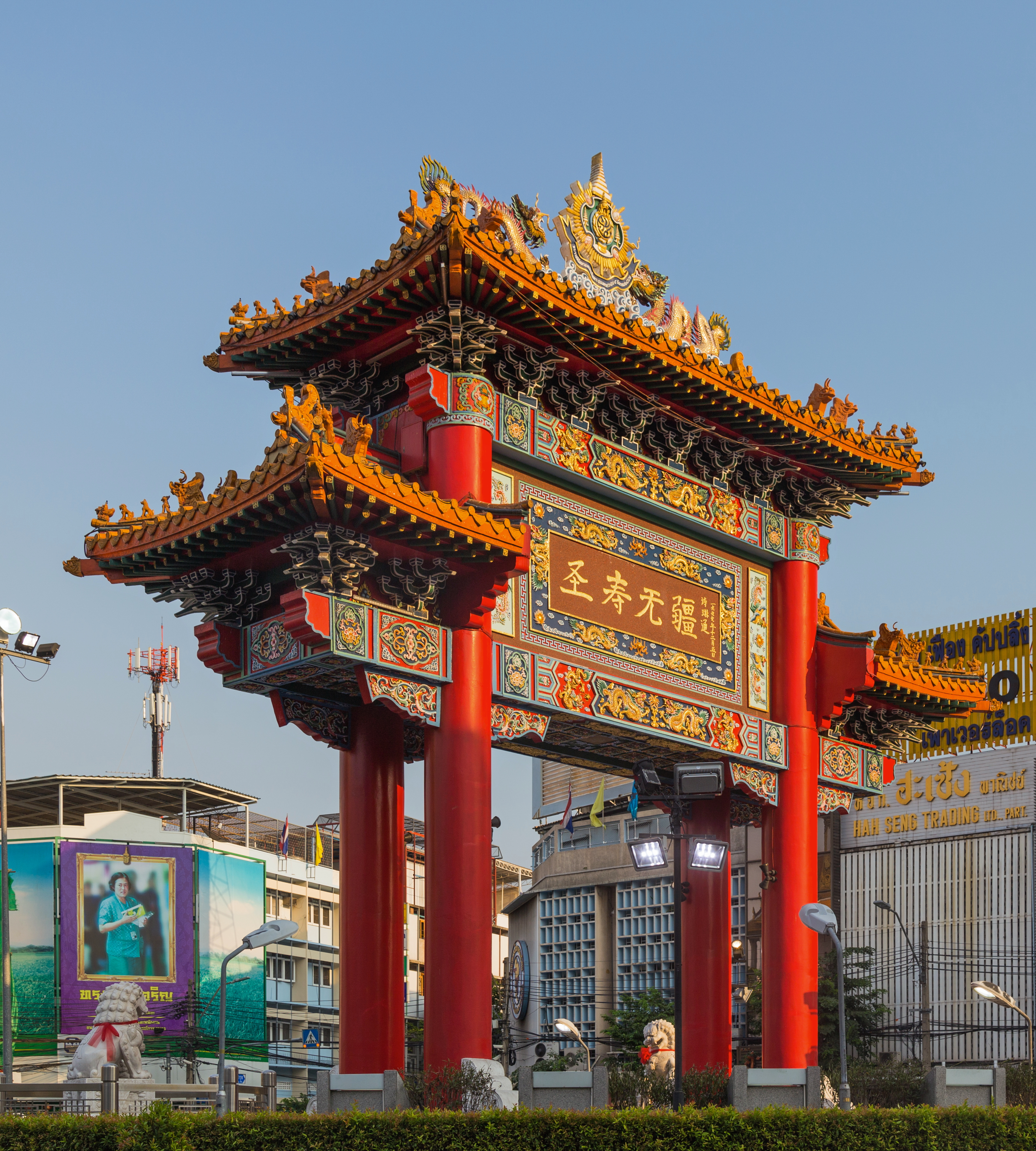
- The Bangkok Chinatown Gate of Odeon Circle
- Nickname: Chinatown
- District location in Bangkok
- Coordinates: 13°43′53″N 100°30′51″E
- Country: Thailand
- Province: Bangkok
- Seat: Talat Noi
- Khwaeng: 3

Area
  - Total: 1.416 km^{2} (0.547 sq mi)

Population (2017)
  - Total: 24,150
  - Density: 17,055/km^{2} (44,170/sq mi)
- Time zone: UTC+7 (ICT)
- Postal code: 10100
- Geocode: 1013

Samphanthawong (Thai: สัมพันธวงศ์, pronounced [sǎm.pʰān.tʰā.wōŋ]) is one of the 50 districts (khet) of Bangkok, Thailand. Regarded as Bangkok's Chinatown, it is the smallest district by area in Thailand. Neighbouring districts are (from north clockwise) Pom Prap Sattru Phai, Bang Rak, Khlong San (across Chao Phraya River), and Phra Nakhon.

== History ==
The area has been a Chinese community since the early days of Bangkok. Originally living in what is now the Phra Nakhon district, they were relocated here when the capital was set up. The narrow Sampheng Lane (สำเพ็ง, now called Wanit I Road, วานิช 1) was the district's main street until Yaowarat Road was constructed in 1892 during the reign of King Chulalongkorn. Sampheng Lane is depicted on the back of series 15 20 baht banknotes, to commemorate an important post-World War II visit by young king Rama VIII (accompanied by HM's brother, Prince Bhumibol, with his ever-present camera). Nowadays, Yaowarat Road remains the heart of Bangkok's Chinatown.

The area now in the Samphanthawong district was once three separate amphoes, Samphanthawong, Sam Yaek, and Chakkrawat, established on 15 October 1915 when old districts were overhauled and replaced by 25 new districts to cover inner Bangkok. Sam Yaek District and Chakkrawat District were later merged into Samphanthawong District. The district became Khet Samphanthawong in 1972. It is believed that the name Samphanthawong was derived from Wat Samphanthawongsaram, the temple near the district office when it was first built. Now the district office has moved to Yotha Road in Talat Noi Sub-district.

== Administration ==
The district is divided into three sub-districts (khwaeng).

| No. | Name | Thai | Area (km^{2}) | Population (Dec 2023) | Density (Dec 2023) | Map |
|---|---|---|---|---|---|---|
| 1. | Chakkrawat | จักรวรรดิ | 0.484 | 5,886 | 12,161.16 | Map |
| 2. | Samphanthawong | สัมพันธวงศ์ | 0.483 | 7,324 | 15,163.56 | Map |
| 3. | Talat Noi | ตลาดน้อย | 0.449 | 6,336 | 14,111.36 | Map |
| Total | | | 1.416 | 19,546 | 13,803.67 | Map |

== Yaowarat Road ==
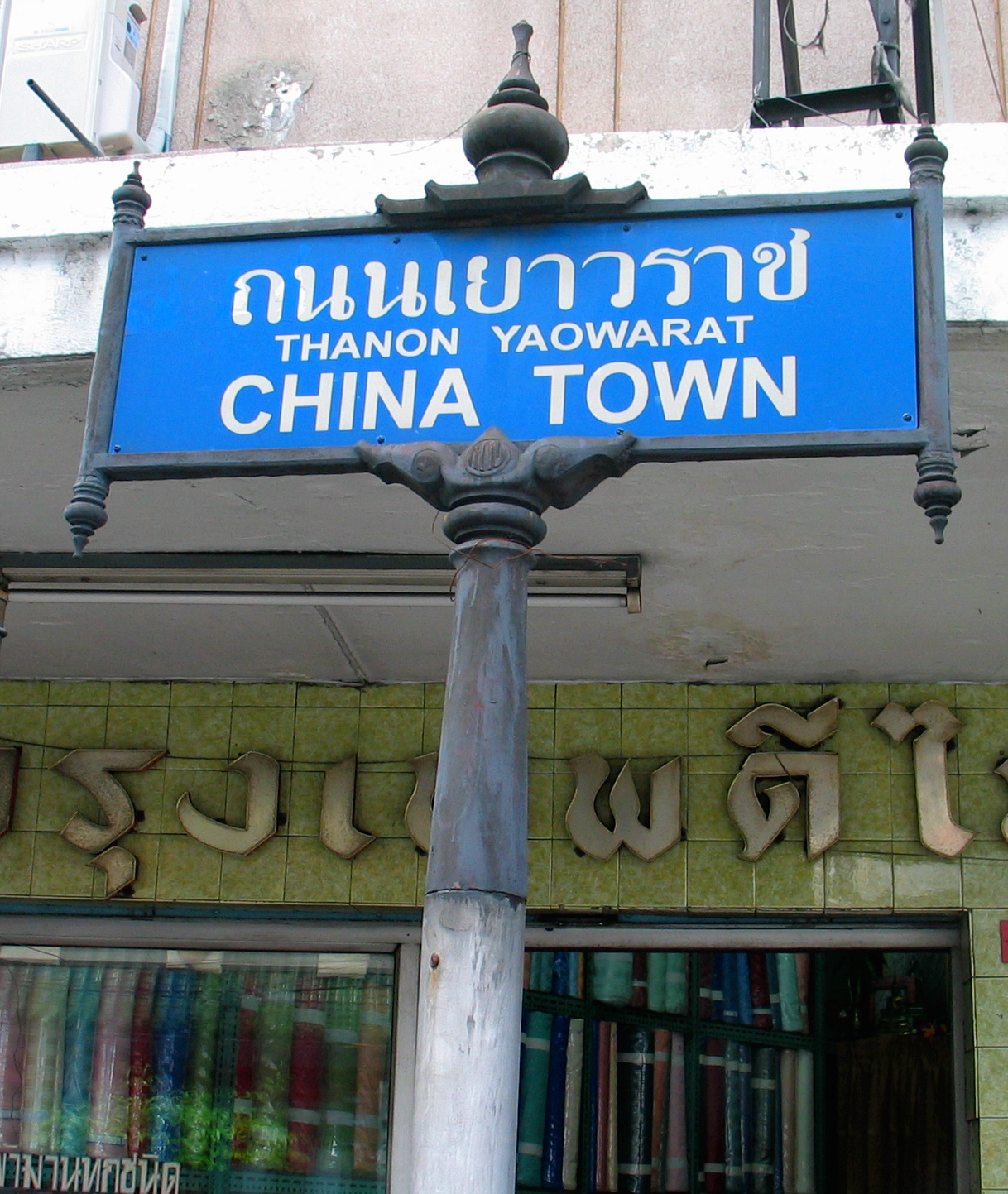
Yaowarat Road sign

Yaowarat Road (เยาวราช) is about 1.5 km in length. Along both sides, gold shops and Chinese restaurants: noodles, rice, dim sum, bird's nest soup are found. More shops, especially those selling fruit and Chinese traditional medicine, can be found in the small lanes branching off the main road. A gate was built to celebrate King Bhumibol's 72nd birthday. At one end of the road is Odeon Circle, named after a cinema that once stood nearby.

== Temples and shrines ==
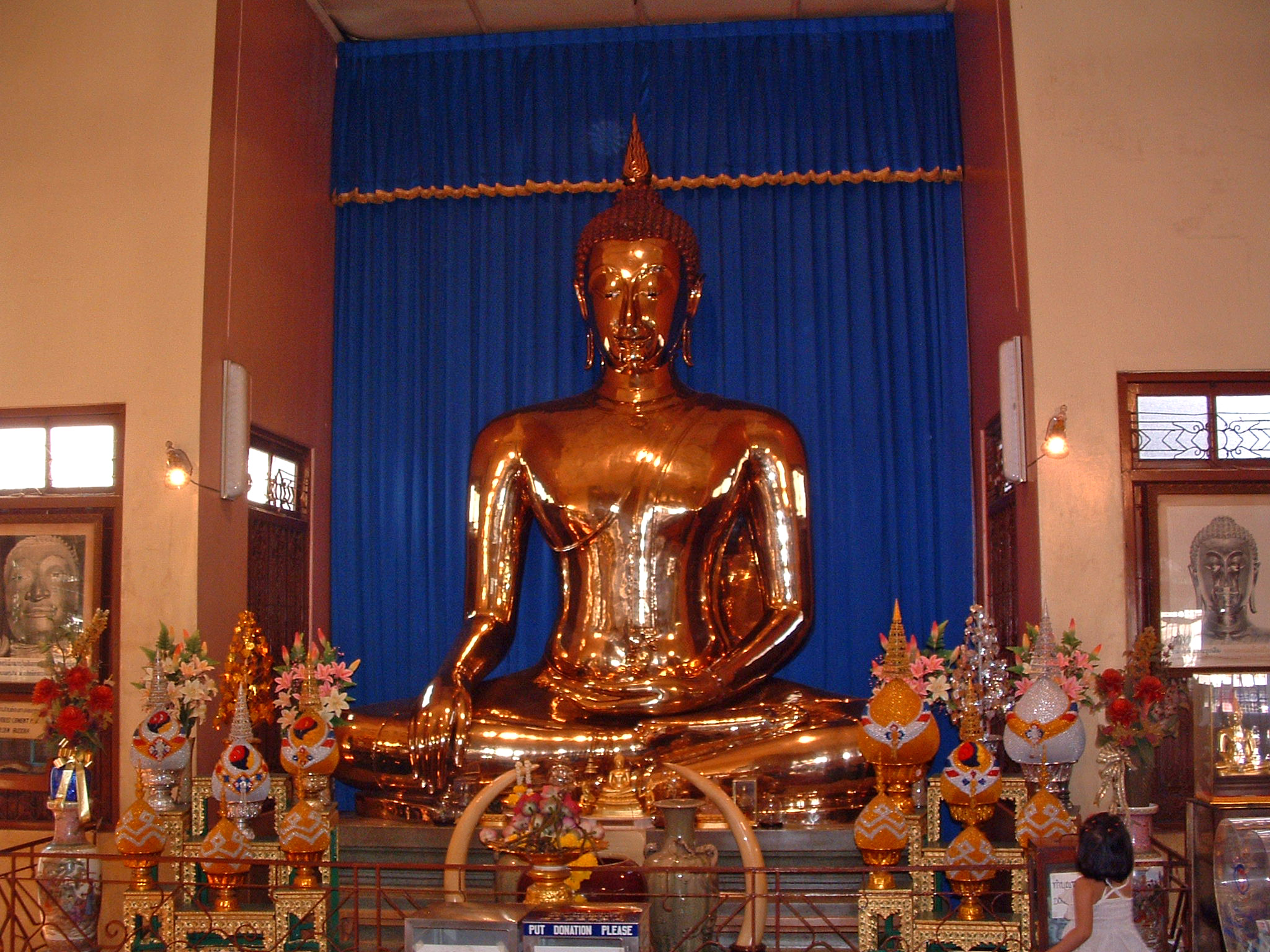
Golden Buddha image at Wat Traimit

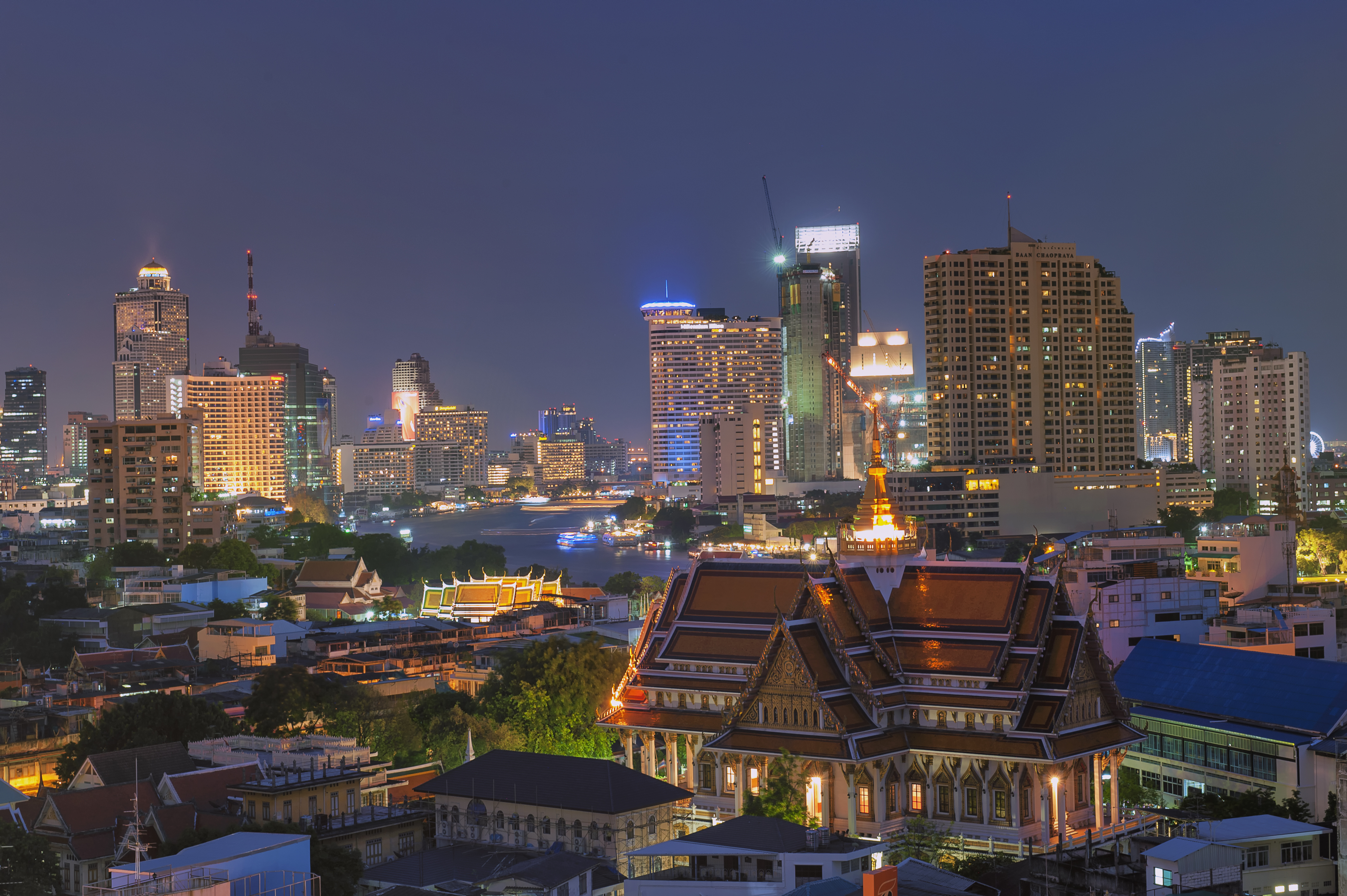
Wat Samphanthawongsaram, formerly Wat Ko

Some of well-known Thai Buddhist Temples in the district are:

- Wat Traimit (วัดไตรมิตรวิทยารามวรวิหาร) is known for its giant Buddha image made from solid gold and weighing about 5.5 tonnes. The gold was hidden under plaster for centuries until being rediscovered in 1954.
- Wat Pathum Khongkha (วัดปทุมคงคา) is an ancient wat, renovated and renamed Wat Sampheng during the King Rama I period.
- Wat Chakkrawat (วัดจักรวรรดิราชาวาสมหาวิหาร) or Wat Sam Pluem (วัดสามปลื้ม)
- Wat Samphanthawongsaram (วัดสัมพันธวงศาราม วรวิหาร) or Wat Ko (วัดเกาะ), a Dhammayuttika temple. Its name is the origin of the district's name and was Dan Beach Bradley's first residence in Thailand.

Many Chinese temples and shrines are also here, including:

- Leng Buai Ia Shrine (ศาลเจ้าเล่งบ๊วยเอี๊ยะ), the oldest shrine in the area, about 300 years old, is considered the oldest Teochew shrine in Thailand.
- Ah Nia Geng Shrine (ศาลเจ้าอาเนี้ยเก็ง) or Chue Pui Nia Nia Shrine (ศาลเจ้าฉื่อปุยเนี่ยเนี้ย), a shrine to Kuan Yin.
- Guan Di Shrine (ศาลเจ้าพ่อกวนอู), shrine to Lord Guan and His horse Sek Tao, in Talat Khao.
- Thien Fah Foundation (มูลนิธิเทียนฟ้า), the first foundation registered in Thailand, established to provide health care for the poor. There is a Guan Yin shrine inside the hospital.
- Bunyasamakhom Shrine (ศาลเจ้าโรงเจบุญสมาคม)
- Chó-su-kong Shrine (ศาลเจ้าโจวซือก๋ง), a shrine to Qing Shui Zu Shi, the oldest Hokkien shrine in Thailand, in Talat Noi, used to organize the largest Chinese vegetarian food festival in the country.

The most famous Chinese temple in the area, Wat Mangkon Kamalawat (วัดมังกรกมลาวาส), popularly known as Wat Leng Noei Yi (วัดเล่งเน่ยยี่), lies just outside the Samphanthawong boundary in the neighboring Pom Prap Sattru Phai District.

== Other places ==
District map

There are other places of historic interest in Samphanthawong. Wat Mae Phra Luk Prakham (วัดแม่พระลูกประคำ) or Holy Rosary Church, on the bank of Chao Phraya River, is one of the oldest Catholic churches in Bangkok. It is more widely known by its older name, Wat Kalawar (วัดกาลหว่าร์), named after Calvary. It was first built in 1787 during King Rama I period by settlers who migrated from Ayuthaya when the city was lost to Burma. The current building was constructed in 1890.

Upriver from the church is Thailand's first commercial bank building. The building was constructed in 1904 and houses the Talat Noi Branch of Siam Commercial Bank. Downriver from Holy Rosary Church is River City Shopping Complex, a shopping center specializing in arts and antiques.

There are numerous markets around Samphanthawong. There are many shops and stalls along Yaowarat, Sampheng (now Wanit 1), and Charoen Krung Roads, especially at night and during weekends. Saphan Lek, the older name of the bridge crossing Khlong Ong Ang canal on Charoen Krung Road, is a narrow strip along both sides of Khlong Ong Ang with small shops selling goods. Nearby is Woeng Nakhon Khasem (เวิ้งนาครเขษม) or "thieves market". The Khlong Thom Market (in Pom Prap Sattru Phai District), once a famous market for low cost goods and electronics, is a large area of several blocks on the opposite side of Charoen Krung Road. The small lanes inside the blocks were fully packed with stalls operating on Saturday nights till Sunday mornings, but it is now closed as part of a pavement cleanup campaign in March 2015.

== Festivals ==
Several Chinese festivals are held here yearly. Yaowarat Road is often closed to traffic during these periods.

- Chinese New Year Festival (เทศกาลตรุษจีน) is the biggest festival with dragon dances, lion dances, and people dressed in red.
- Mid-Autumn Festival (เทศกาลไหว้พระจันทร์) with shops selling mooncakes.
- Chinese Vegetarian Food Festival (เทศกาลกินเจ) (1st to 9th day of 9th lunar month) is a nine-day period when many Chinese practice vegetarianism and dress in white. All over Yaowarat Road, vegetarian food stalls with yellow flags and the Chinese character 齋 in red can be seen. Some foods look like meat but are made from soybeans.

== Politics ==
Samphanthawong is regarded as one of the Democrat Party's strongholds in Bangkok, similar to the adjacent Pom Prap Sattru Phai district, due to their shared characteristics as Chinatown areas. In the 2026 Bangkok Metropolitan Council election, which was held concurrently with the Bangkok gubernatorial election, the seat was won by Pinit Kanchanachusak of the Democrat Party. He has served as the Bangkok Metropolitan Council (MC) member for Samphanthawong for six terms, including this election. He is also the elder brother of Onanong Kanchanachusak, a former Democrat Party Member of Parliament (MP) for the same constituency.

== Gallery ==
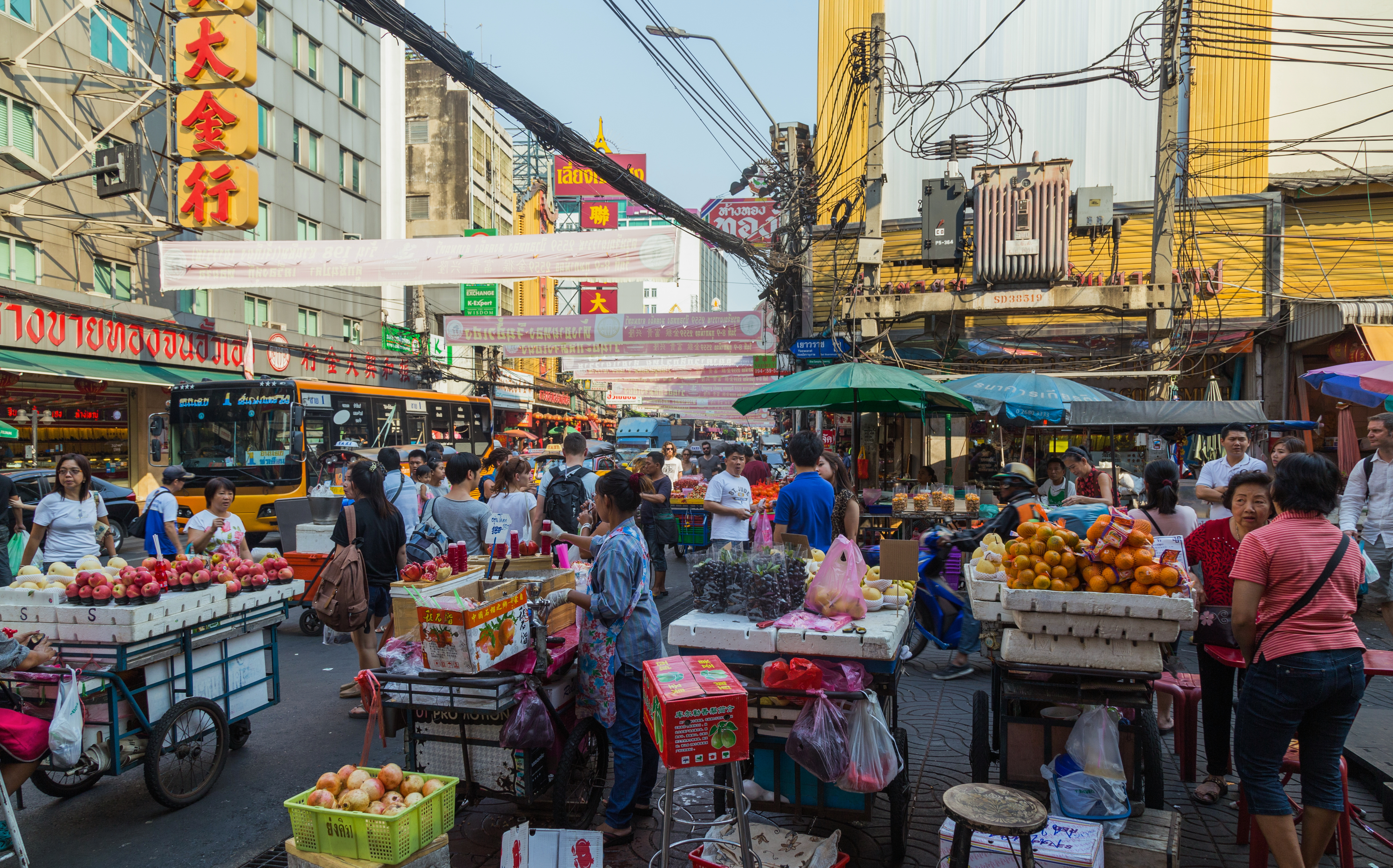
Street food vendors in front of Talat Khao (ตลาดเก่า) or Old Market side of Yaowarat Road

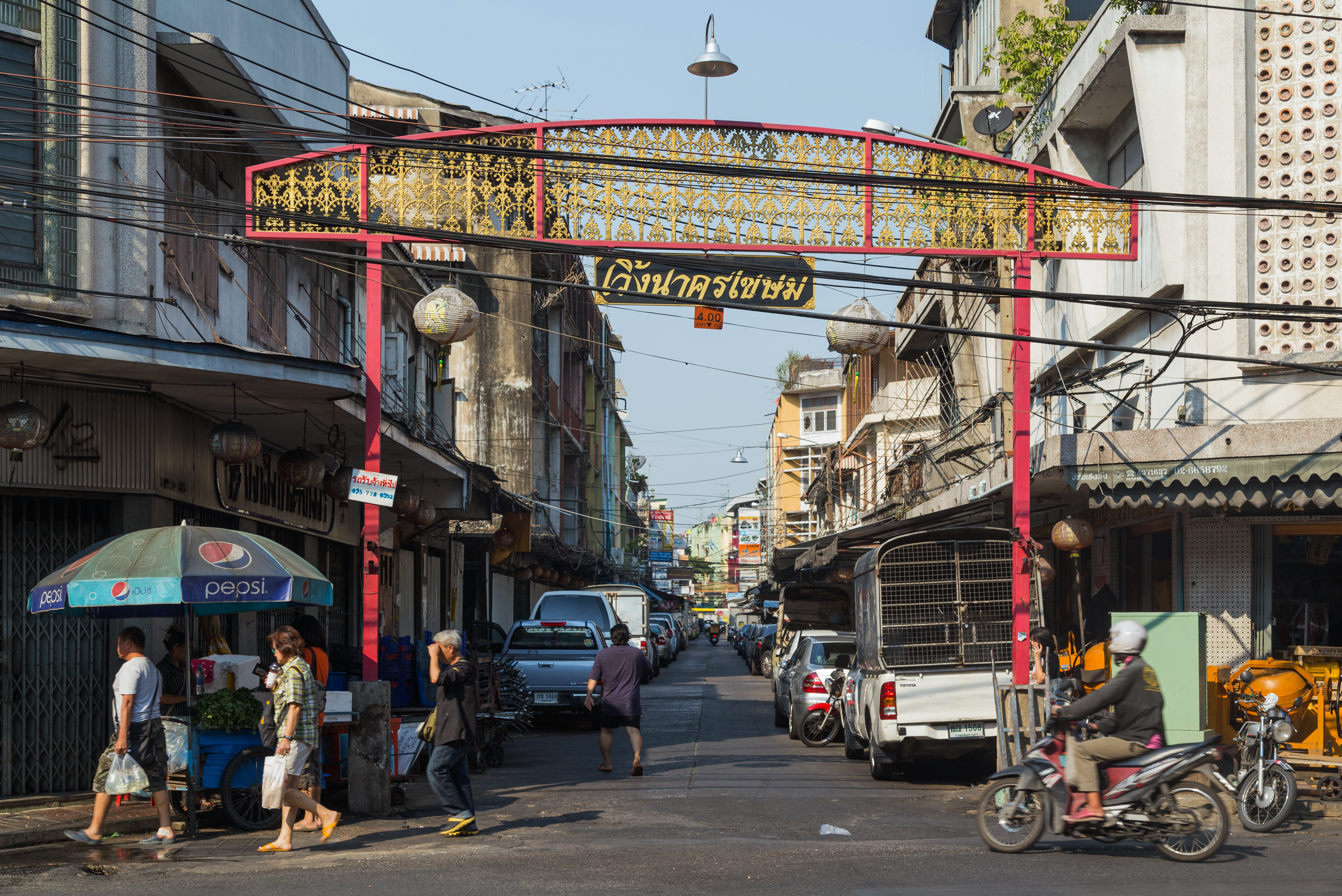
Entrance of Thieves' Market or commonly known as Woeng Nakhon Kasem, a historic shopping district in the district

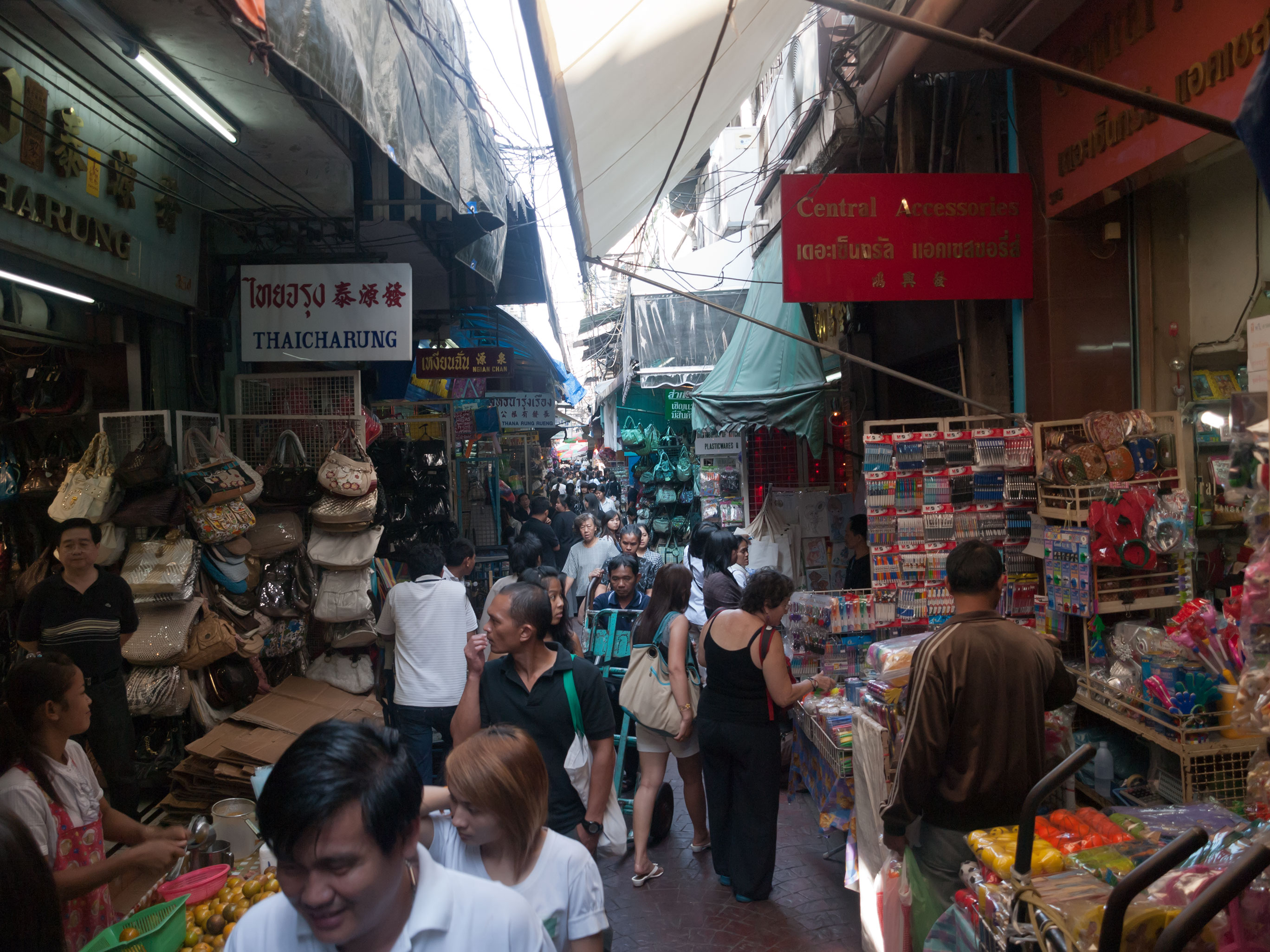
Atmosphere of Soi Wanit 1 or better known as Sampheng, the main marketplace in Samphanthawong District

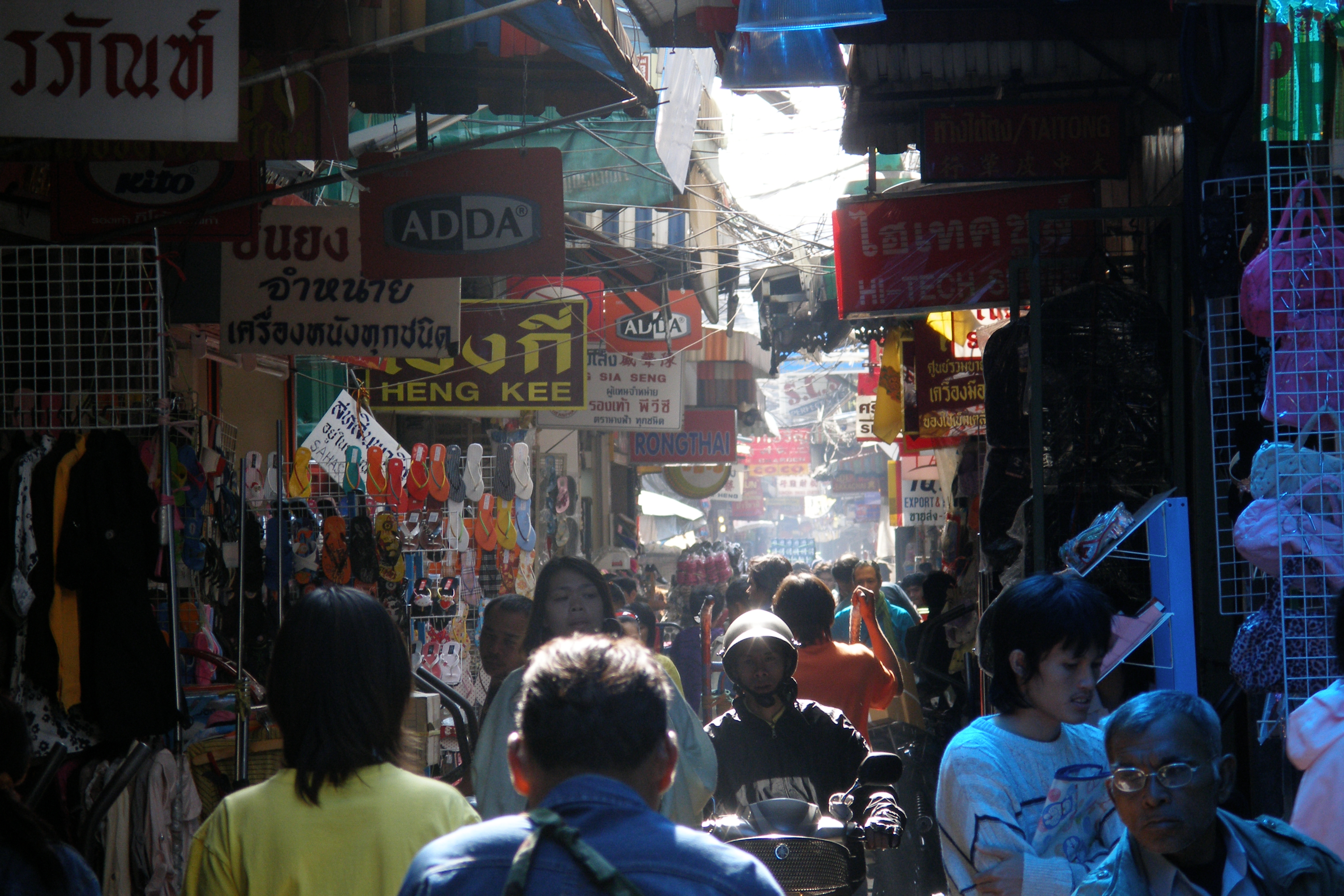
Sampeng Lane

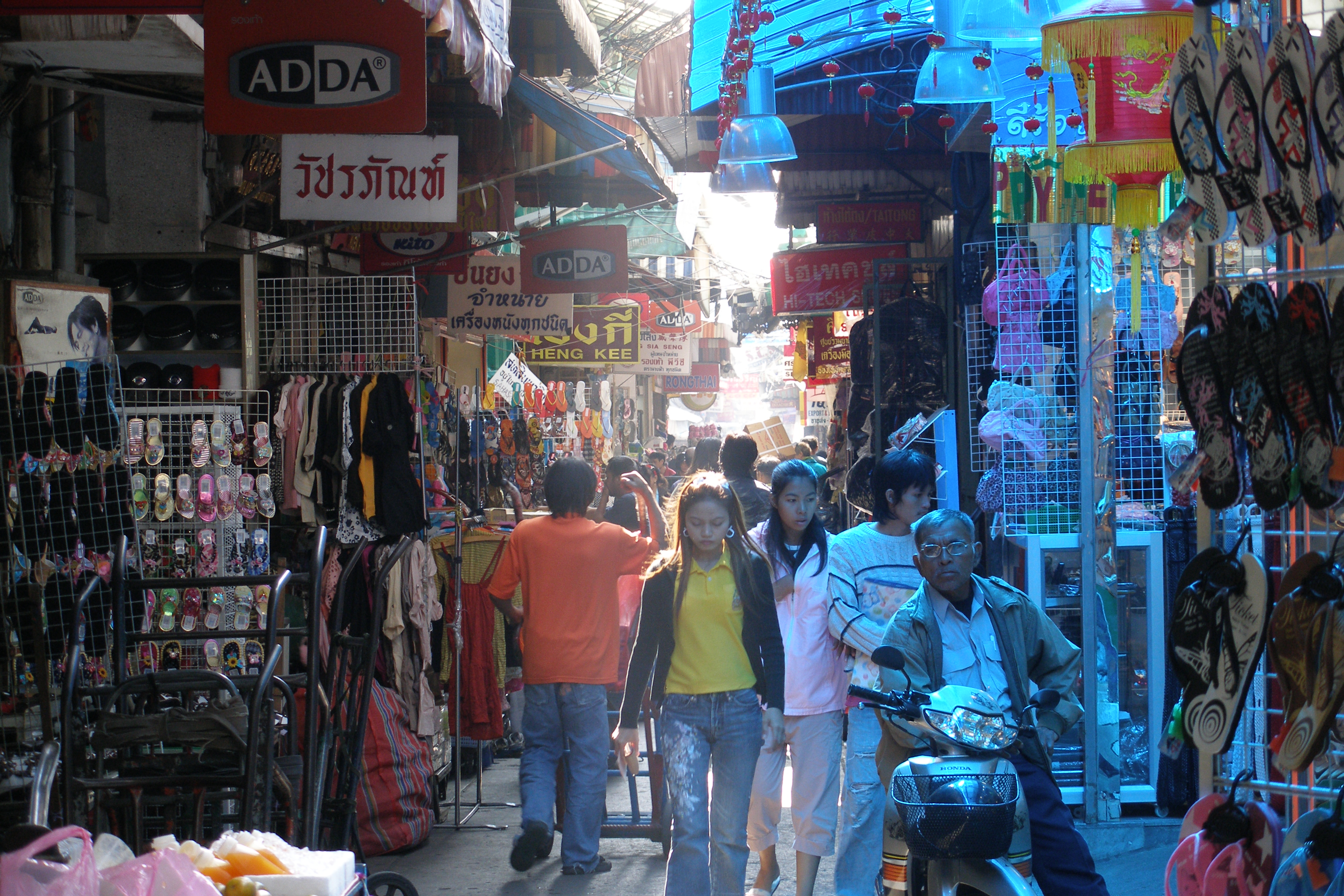
Sampeng Lane

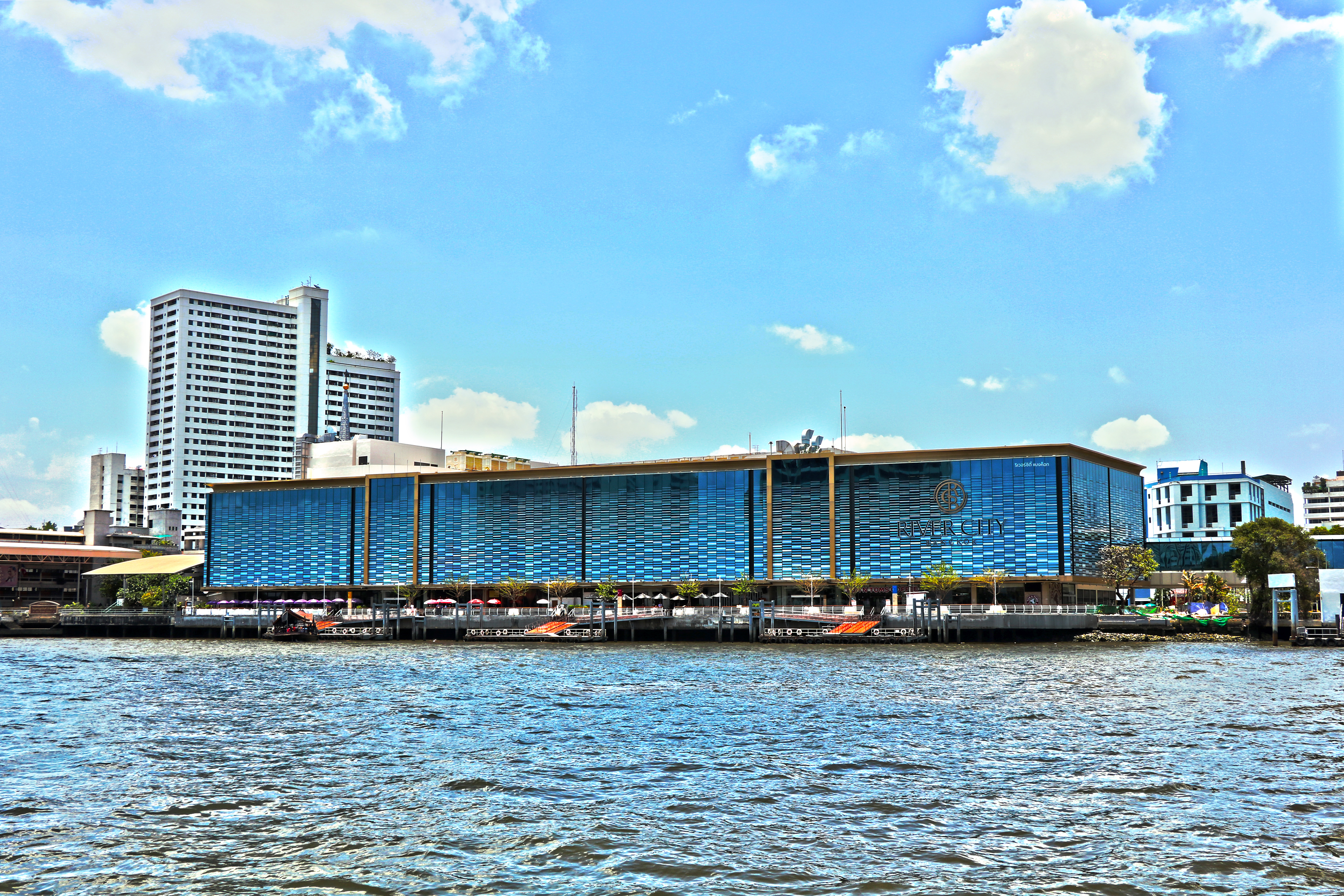
River City Shopping Complex, a shopping center by the Chao Phraya River next to Royal Orchid Sheraton Hotel in Bang Rak District

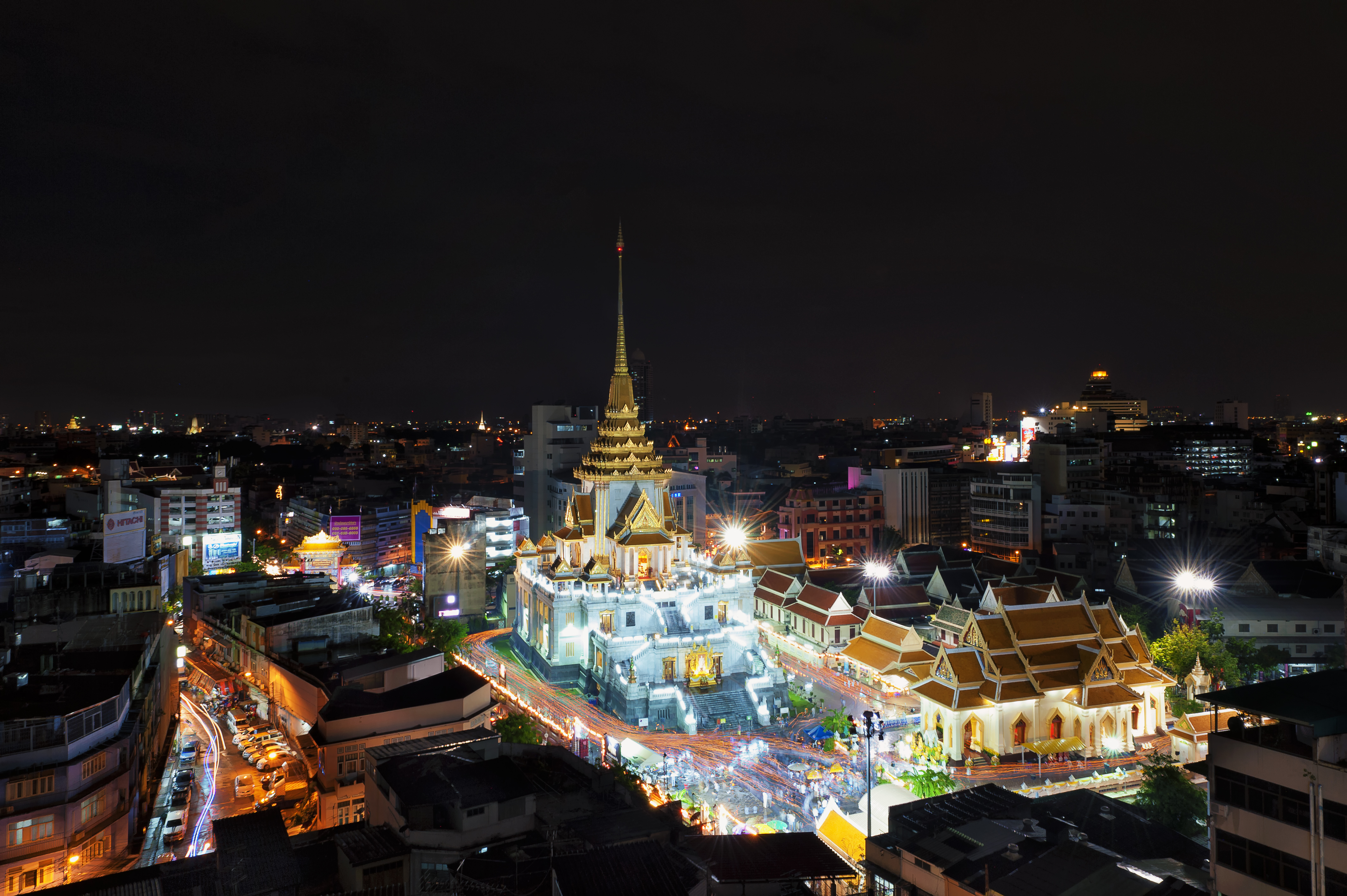
Wat Traimit at night

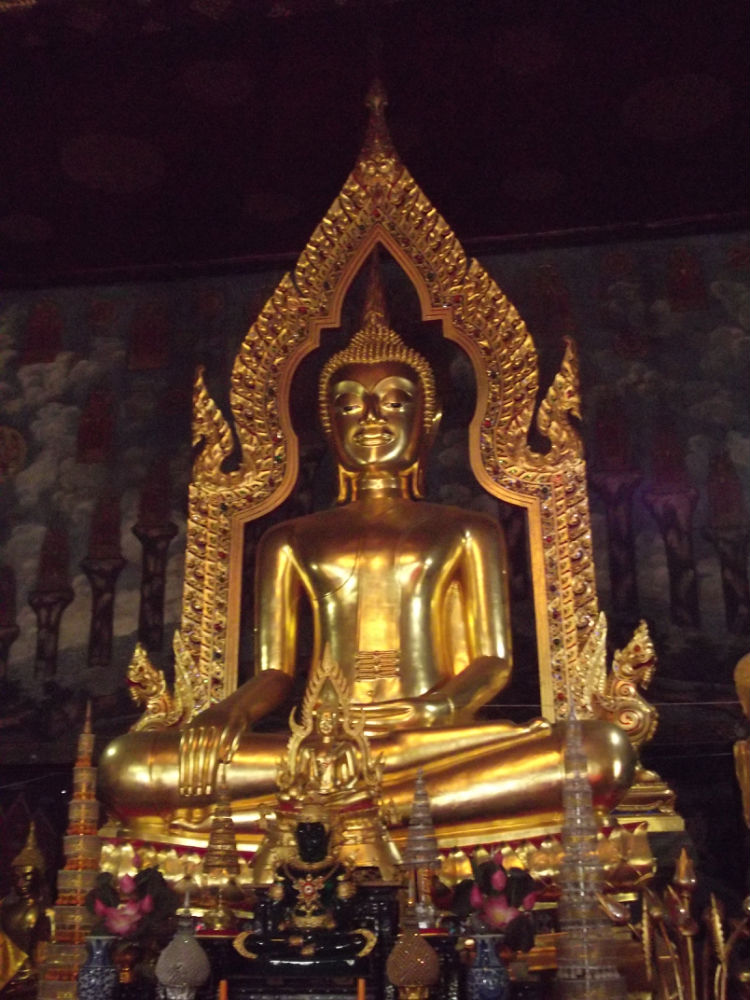
Principal Buddha image at Wat Chakkrawat

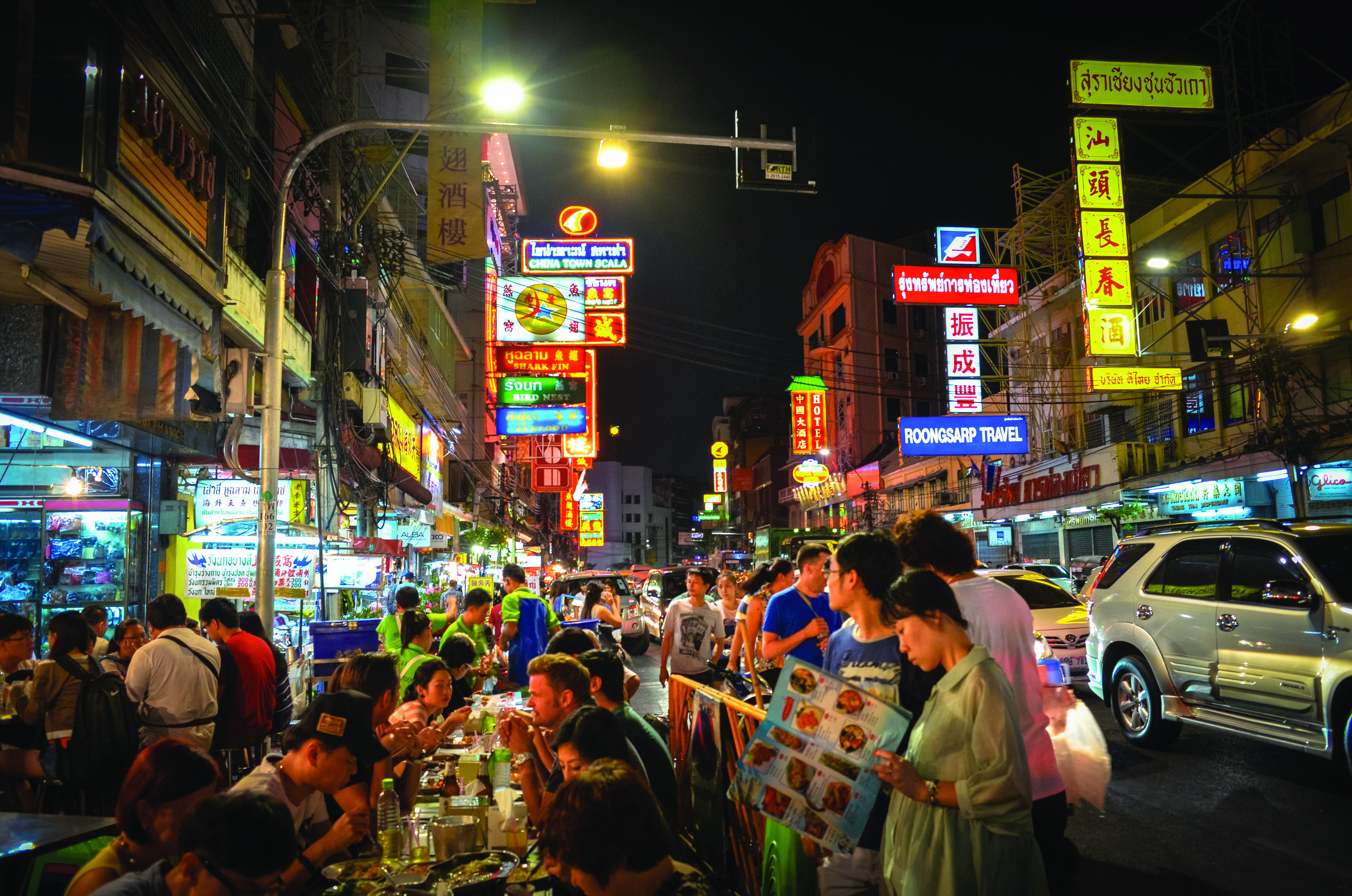
The colours of Yaowarat Road at night

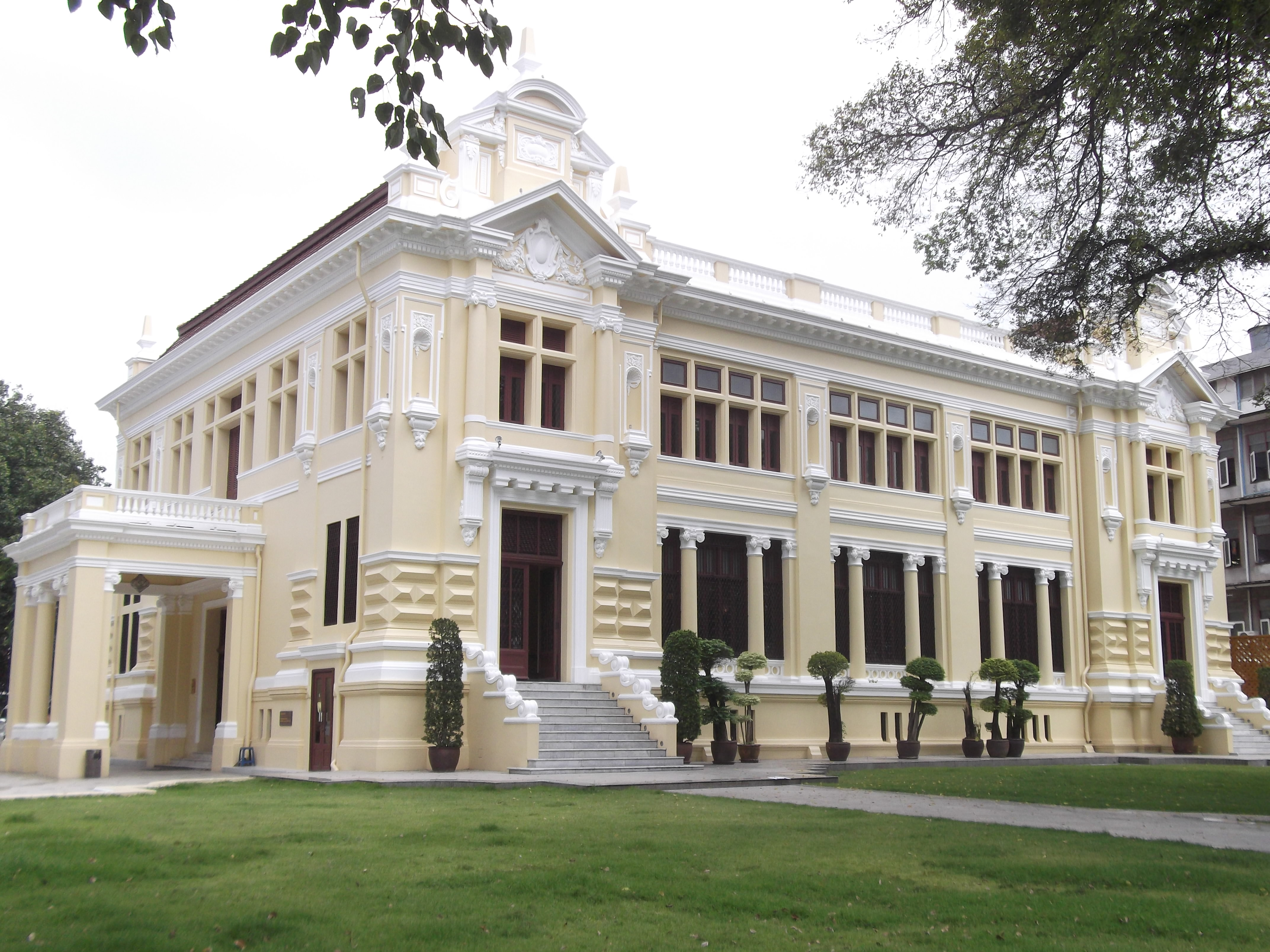
Historic Siam Commercial Bank, Talat Noi Branch

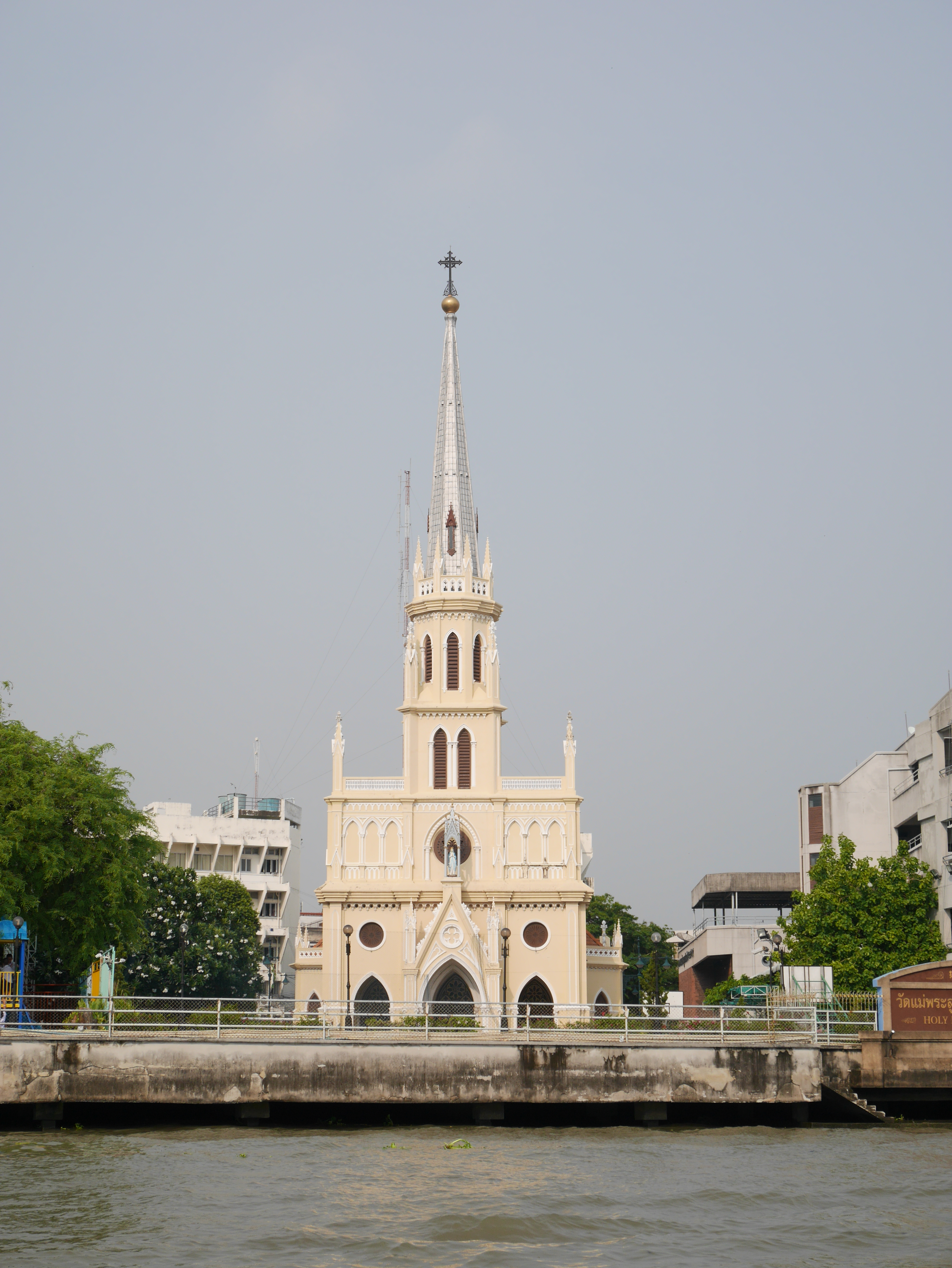
Holy Rosary Church from mid-Chao Phraya River

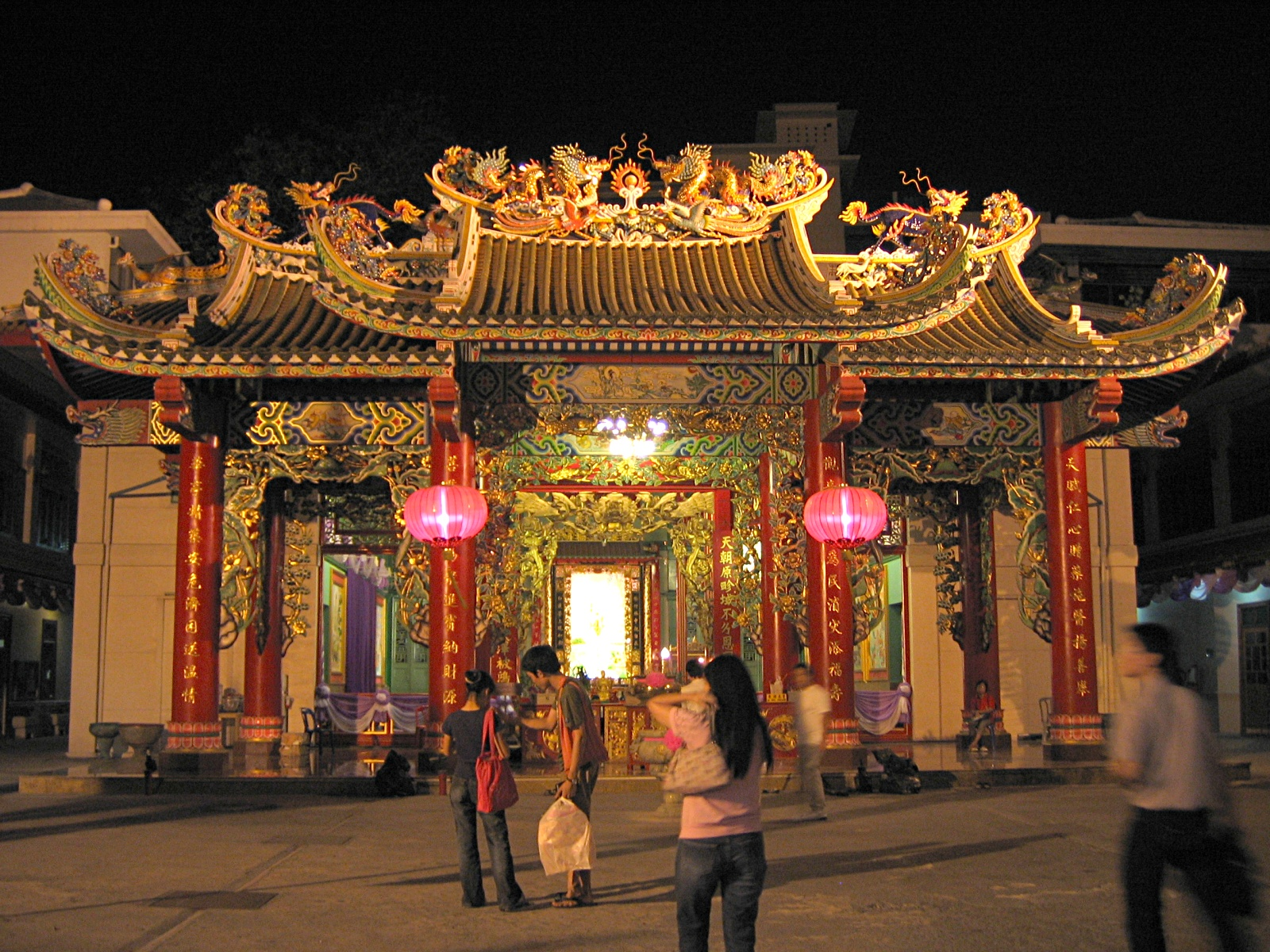
Thien Fah Foundation open at night during Chinese New Year

== Notable people ==
- Puey Ungphakorn: economist
- Kunoi Vithichai: professional boxer
- Charoen Sirivadhanabhakdi: businessman
- Paiboon Damrongchaitham: businessman
- Chuwit Kamolvisit (Davis Kamol): businessman, politician, TV host
- Somkid Jatusripitak: economist, politician
