= Khlong Thom, Bangkok =

Coordinates: 13°44′43″N 100°30′26″E

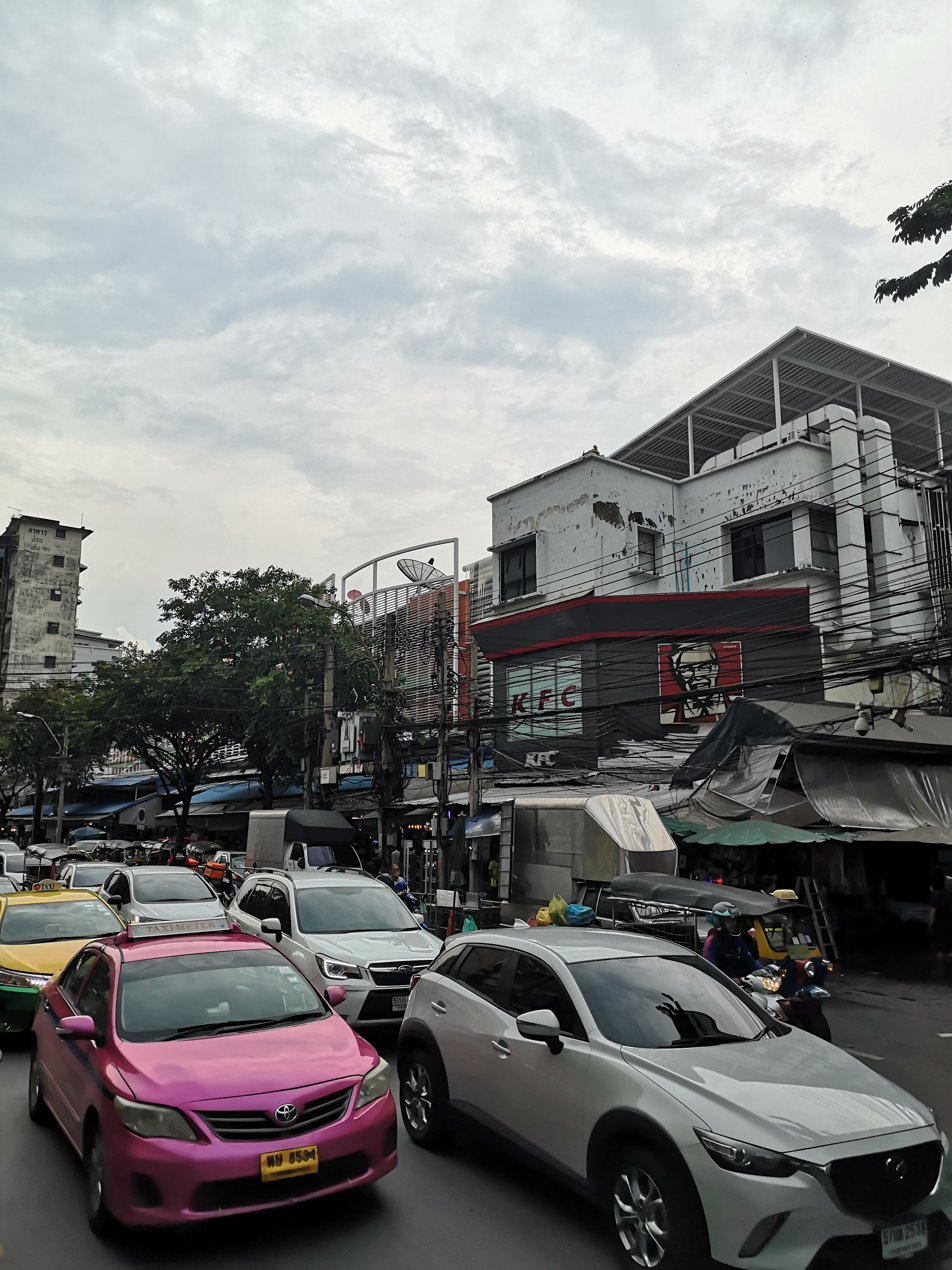
Khlong Thom Center, a mall housing a large number of stores in the Khlong Thom area

Khlong Thom (Thai: คลองถม, pronounced [kʰlɔ̄ːŋ.tʰǒm]) is a neighbourhood in Bangkok, mainly in Pom Prap Sattru Phai District. It is located along Mahachak Road around its intersection with Charoen Krung, on the periphery of Bangkok's Chinatown in Samphanthawong District. Mahachak Road was built around 1930 on the site of the former Khlong Sampheng. The canal was filled in to make way for the road, hence the name Khlong Thom, which means "filled canal".

The Khlong Thom area is well known for shops and vendors selling a variety of goods, especially automotive hardware and electrical equipment. The vendors used to gather into a large market on Saturday nights, which encroached on public space and blocked traffic. In March 2015, the Bangkok Metropolitan Administration cracked down on the practice, shutting down the market and forcing the vendors to relocate.

At around 9:30 p.m. on August 28, 2026, a fire broke out at Khlong Thom Center. Explosions were heard intermittently, and part of the building subsequently collapsed. Then, at around 2:30 p.m. on August 29, the fire reignited, sending toxic smoke and PM2.5 pollution across the surrounding area.
