= Chao Phraya Sky Park =

Elevated park in Bangkok, Thailand

Coordinates: 13.738764°N 100.498364°E

- สวนลอยฟ้าเจ้าพระยา
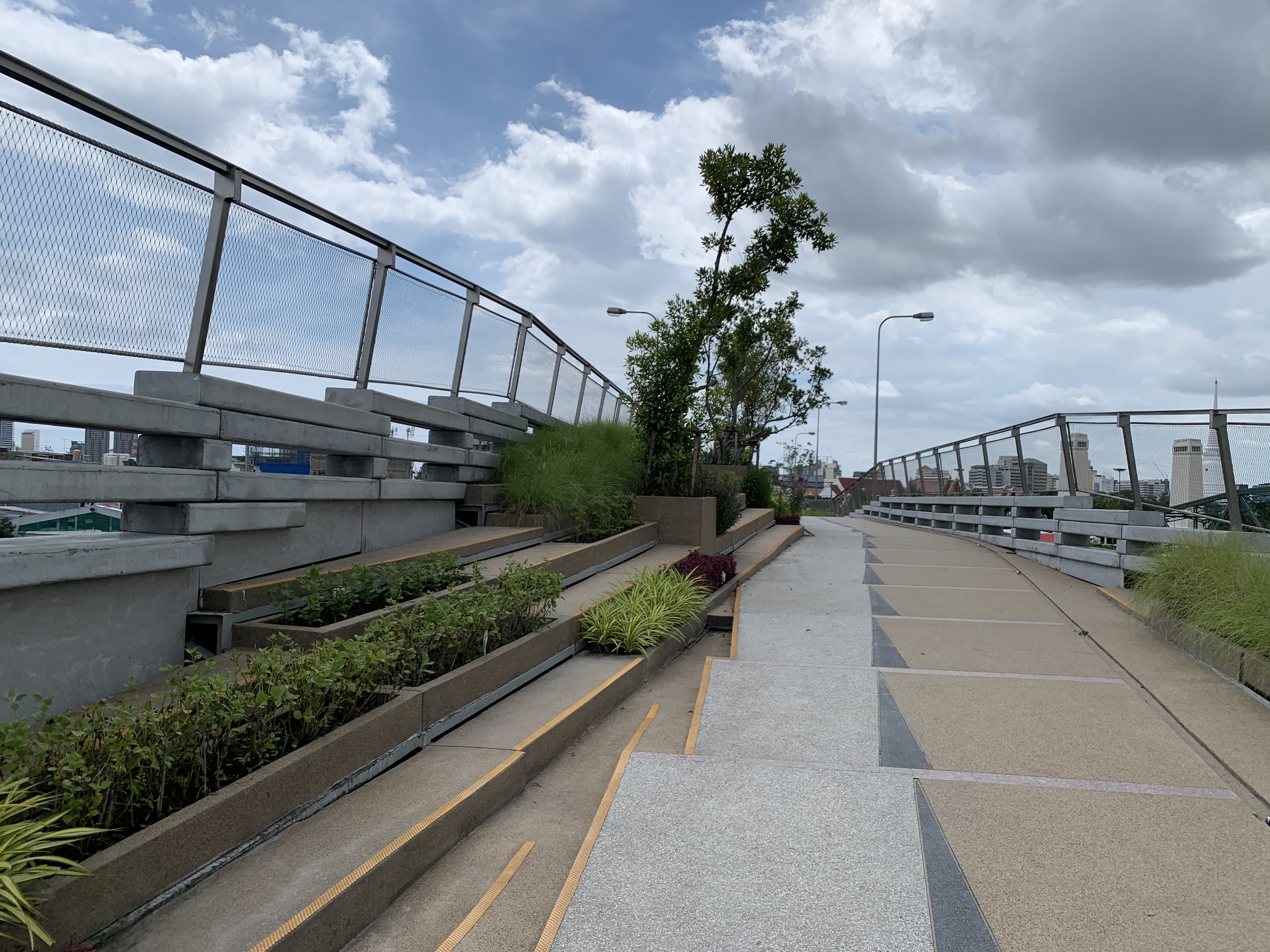
- Interactive map of Chao Phraya Sky Park
- Type: Urban linear park
- Location: Chao Phraya River, Bangkok, Thailand
- Area: A linear 280 m (918.6 ft) stretch of Phra Pok Klao Bridge

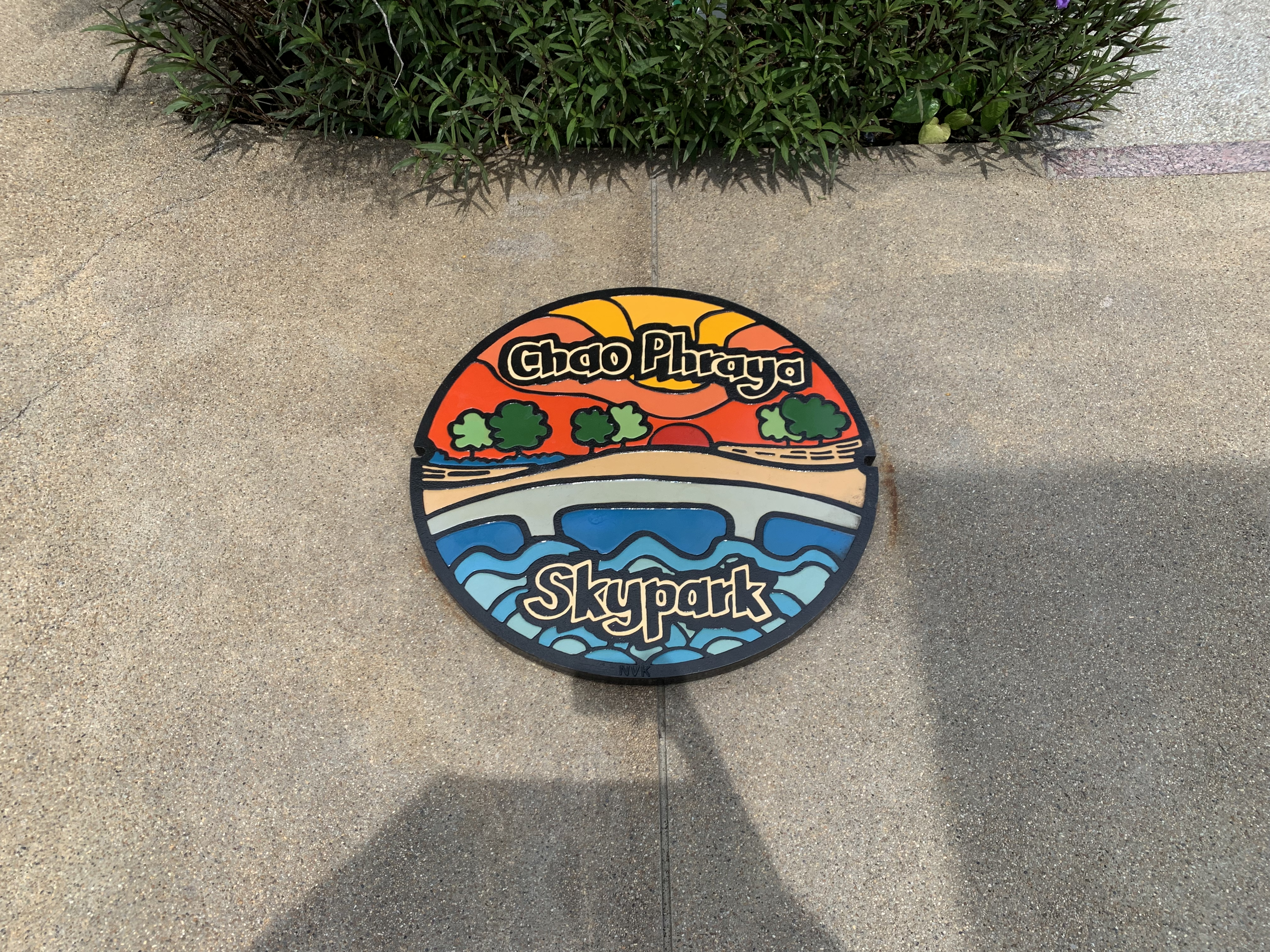
Chao Phraya Sky Park manhole cover

Chao Phraya Sky Park (Thai: สวนลอยฟ้าเจ้าพระยา) is an elevated, linear park in Bangkok, built on the central viaduct that used to be the structure of the failed Lavalin Skytrain project. The path, which is about 280 m (918.6 ft) in length, was designed by Urban Design and Development Center, Chulalongkorn University, and opened in June 2020. The Sky Park is considered the first sky park in Southeast Asia.

== History ==
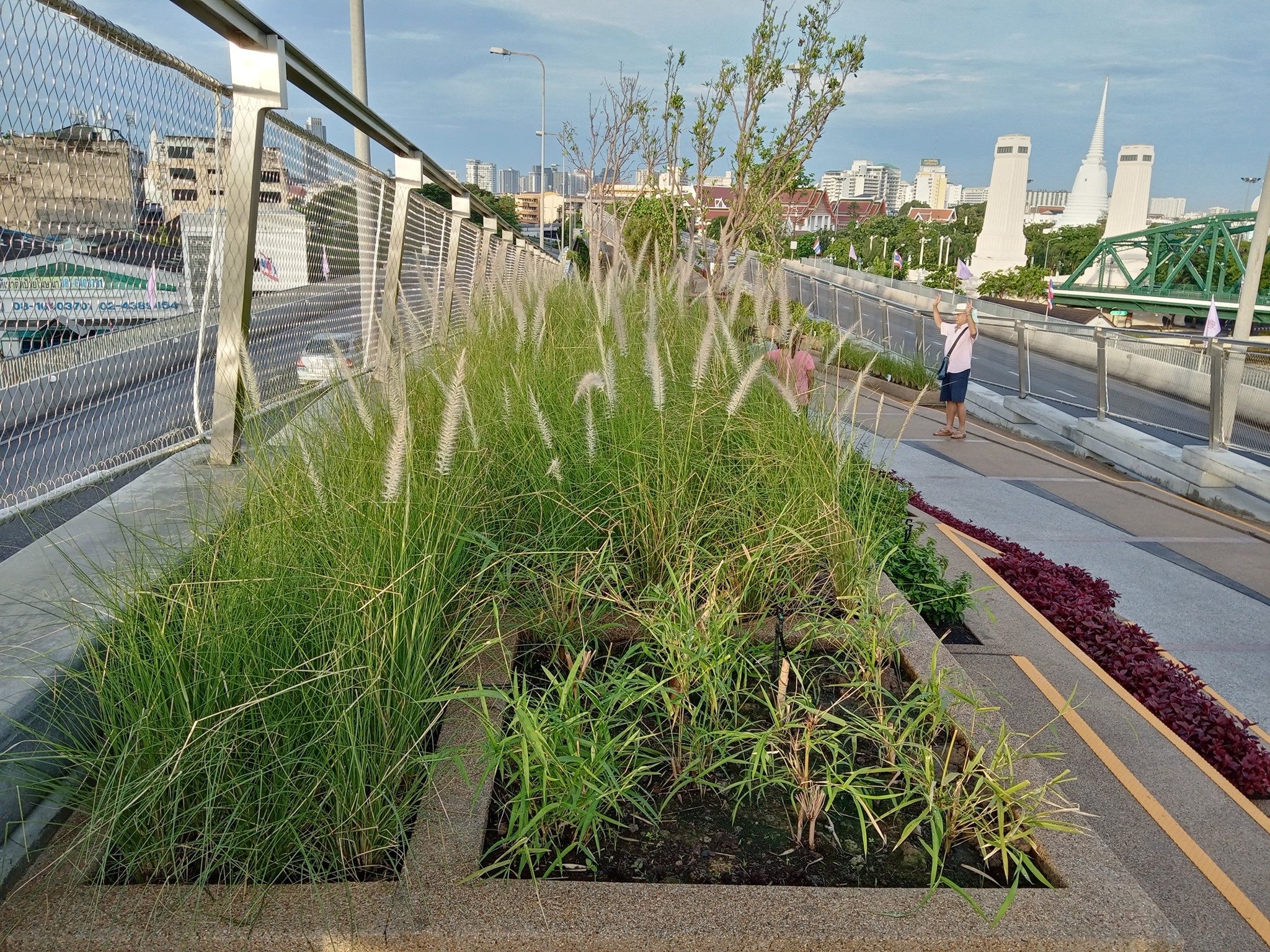
Plant in Chao Phraya Sky Park

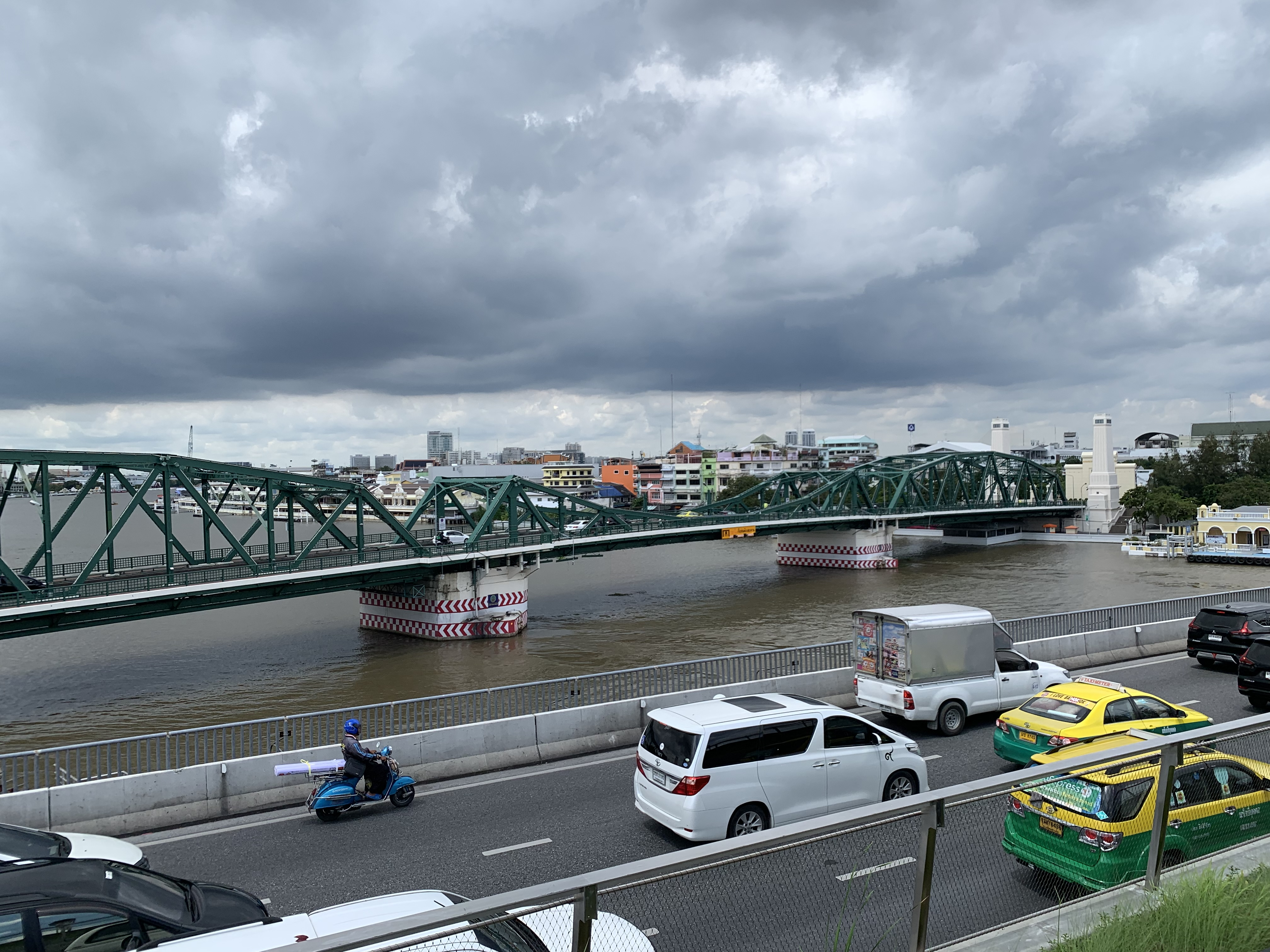
View of Chao Phraya river from sky park

This viaduct was the site of the construction of the Lavalin Skytrain project, which was the first electric train line of Bangkok. The construction route had been studied since 1979 until the construction contract was signed in 1990. After only 2 years, Lavalin Company was facing financial problems so the project had to be abandoned, leaving only the bridge. Subsequently, Bangkok Metropolitan Administration teamed up with the Urban Design and Development Center (UDDC), as well as the Office of the Health Promotion Fund and Chulalongkorn University to develop the landscape in the Kudi Chin area to the Khlong San area.

Therefore, there developed a project to renovate the remains of this abandoned viaduct to be a public park in the middle of the river. It was designed by N7A, in charge of architecture, and Land Process, in charge of landscape architecture, which was originally named Phra Prajadhipok Bridge Sky Park. It was later forwarded to Bangkok in 2018 by SGR Company, which bid for the project at a price of 122 million baht. The project was constructed in March 2019 and the contract expired in March 2020. Bangkok Metropolitan Administration organized a contest to name this park in the middle of the river again. The name that won the contest was "Chao Phraya Sky Park" and the park officially opened on June 25, 2020.

== Design ==
An architect from N7A named Mr. Chakdao Navacharoen said the initial issue was quite challenging. The first building was constructed for the electric train project. The first drawback is that the project's placement is between a driveway with three lanes on both sides, making the bridge's walkway extremely small. However, the project's location is a benefit. Although it is obstructed by traffic on the Phra Pok Klao Bridge, it is still possible to see both the Memorial Bridge and Wat Arun.

== Location ==
The Chao Phraya Sky Park located in the middle between 2 lanes of Phra Pok Klao Bridge.

== Chao Phraya Sky Park places ==
- Walkways and bike paths across Chao Phraya river - There are walkways and bicycle paths with a length of about 280 m (918.6 ft) and a width of 8.5 m (27.9 ft), with railings 2 m (6.6 ft)–3 m (9.8 ft) high, including an elevator for the disabled and the elderly who use the service so that everyone can use the service thoroughly.
- Cultivate a wide variety of plants - There are green areas along the walkway as well by choosing plants suitable for the weather of Bangkok. The water olive tree is the main perennial plant and many other plant species such as variegated leaves, oleander, purpura, stingrays, and crocuses, adding green spaces and trees to the city, as well as plants on the sky garden are also beneficial to insects and the overall ecosystem.
- 360-degree view of Chao Phraya River - When it is a floating park on the Chao Phraya River will have to witness the beauty of the surrounding scenery of the city's main river By dividing the viewpoint into 3 points, consisting of Lan Arun Rung, Jai Chao Phraya and Lan Tawan Ron to promote it as a tourist attraction and is a new landmark of Bangkok lively and has meaning for the old city on both sides of the Chao Phraya River attracted both Thai and foreign tourists.
- Take a walking tour from the Sky Garden - When the Chao Phraya Sky Garden has connected the traffic between the Thonburi side and the Phra Nakhon side and connect the area and promote the landscape of Kudi Chin-Khlong San area connects Bangkok Forest Park Phra Pok Klao Bridge to the King Prajadhipok Park, Phra Nakhon District, continues until the canal area around Rattanakosin and other districts, allowing us to walk to other places in close distance as well, such as the Old General Post Office, Memorial Bridge, Wat Prayurawongsawat, Santa Cruz Church and the Kudi Chin community.
