= South Sukhumvit =

South Sukhumvit สุขุมวิทใต้
- Innovation district
- Established: 2018

Government
  - Body: South Sukhumvit Association

South Sukhumvit (Thai: สุขุมวิทใต้) is an innovation district of Bangkok, Thailand along Sukhumvit Road, bound to the north by BTS On Nut station, south to BTS Bangna station, west to the edge of the Chao Phraya River and east to Srinagarindra Road. The district includes True Digital Park and Cloud 11.

== History ==
In 2018, Thailand's National Innovation Agency (NIA) announced plans to develop the area, originally branded "Bangkok Cybertech District", as Thailand's model digital district.

In 2022, the Urban Design and Development Center, government, and local stakeholders launched a collaborative plan for the district.

The area's creative economy is led by the South Sukhumvit Association, a group of private entities and government agencies, in collaboration with the Creative Economy Agency and Phra Khanong District office.

The area was designated as one of Bangkok's 15 Creative Districts in Bangkok Design Week 2024.
