= Lavalin Skytrain =

Overview
- Owner: Expressway Authority of Thailand (cancelled)
- Locale: Bangkok, Thailand
- Transit type: Rapid transit
- Number of lines: 3 (cancelled)

Operation
- Operator: Lavalin (cancelled)

Technical
- System length: 61 km (38 mi)

Lavalin Skytrain (Thai: โครงการรถไฟฟ้าลาวาลิน) is a cancelled rapid transit in Bangkok, planned since 1984 during Prem Tinsulanonda reign as prime minister. It was to have been operated by Lavalin (SNC-Lavalin), a Canadian firm, which built the Skytrain system in Vancouver, Canada and two short lines in Toronto and Detroit. The BTS Skytrain was eventually built by Siemens, while Bombardier Inc., successor of Lavalin, eventually landed an order in Kuala Lumpur, the 29 km Kelana Jaya line.

== Plans ==
Three initial lines were planned:

- Rama IV Line: Phra Khanong-Hua Lamphong-Mo Chit; length, 25 km (15.53 mi).
- Sathon Line: Wongwian Yai-Sathon-Lat Phrao; length, 20 km (12.43 mi), crossing the Chao Phraya River via the center lane of the Taksin Bridge. (The center lane of the bridge is now the BTS Silom Line viaduct).
- Saphan Phut Line: Dao Khanong-Memorial Bridge-Makkasan; length 16 km (9.94 mi), crossing the river via center lane of the Phra Pok Klao Bridge. (The center lane of the bridge is used as a walkway and garden observatory called "Chao Phraya Sky Park").

The depot was in the Huai Khwang District, near the present-day (2018) MRT Blue Line depot.

The Lavalin Skytrain was canceled during the administration of Anand Panyarachun. The Thai newspaper Daily News claimed that the project was abandoned because Lavalin could not come up with the financing, but nearly all international media sources cited "political interference" as the reason the contract was terminated by the new government in 1992.

Map of the system

== See also ==
- BTS Skytrain
- Bangkok Elevated Road and Train System - another cancelled rapid transit project in Bangkok
