= Praisaniyakhan =

Coordinates: 13°44′24.05″N 100°29′58.93″E

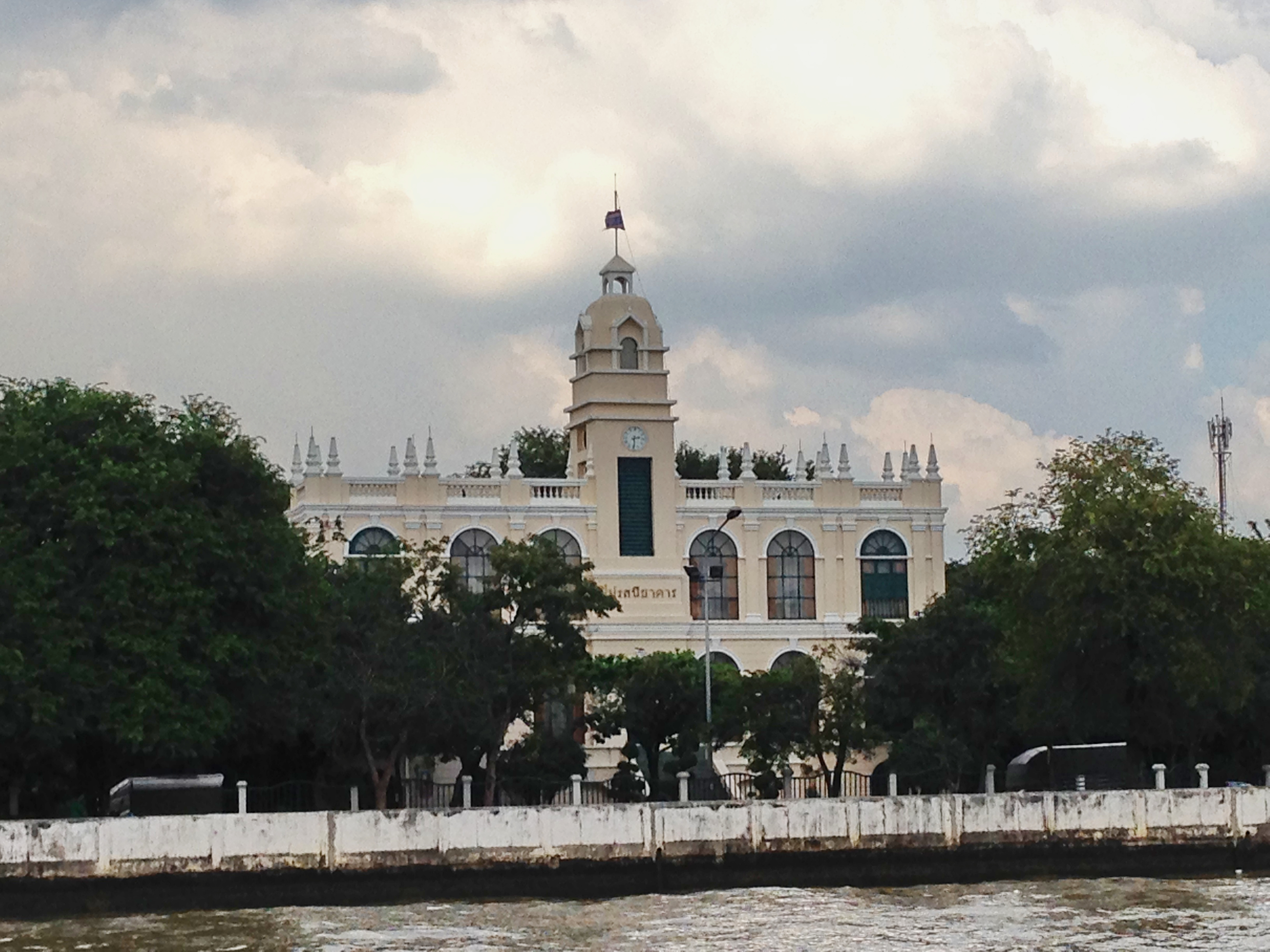
Praisaniyakhan seen from middle of Chao Phraya River

Praisaniyakhan (Thai: ไปรษณียาคาร, lit. 'Postal Building') is the original location of the Thai Post Department, Thailand’s first postal office. The office stood on the eastern bank of Chao Phraya River at the mouth of Khlong Ong Ang (Ong Ang Canal) on the Phra Nakhon side near the area of Pak Khlong Talat, south of Memorial Bridge. It is a three-storey striking white Western-style building.

== History ==
Praisaniyakhan was built in 1871 as the residence of Phra Prichakonlakan (Sam-ang Amattayakun), the former governor of Prachinburi, eastern Siam (former name of Thailand) who was later charged with treason for the corruption over a gold mine in Kabin Buri. Phra Prichakonlakan was executed on November 24, 1879 and his assets were seized.

King Chulalongkorn (Rama V) established the Thai postal service on August 4, 1883. Prince Bhanurangsi Savangwongse was the first director-general of the Post and Telegraph Department and converted the residence of Phra Prichakonlakan to serve as the postal office, naming it "Praisaniyakhan".

In the revolution of 1932, Praisaniyakhan was the first target that the People’s Party (Khana Ratsadon) tried to seize as it was the communication hub handling telegraphy and telephony. The mission was led by the civil faction of the People’s Party, comprising Khuang Abhaiwongse and Prayoon Pamornmontri. The latter previously worked there and knew the inside. Guarded by a few members of the Navy faction of the People’s Party, the seizure had to start by 4:00 AM and be completed by 5:00 AM. to prevent suspicion. One staffer reported the plan to the police at Chakkrawat Police Station nearby. Police Lieutenant General Phraya Athikarnprakat (Loui Chatikavanij) who served as director-general of Police Department, hastened to Bangkhunphrom Palace to report the situation to Fleet Admiral Paribatra Sukhumbandhu, Prince of Nakhon Sawan, who served as the regent.

Praisaniyakhan was demolished in 1982 for the construction of Phra Pok Klao Bridge on the occasion of the 200th-anniversary celebration of Rattanakosin Kingdom (Bangkok). A smaller replica was later built on land nearest to the original site, featuring an exhibit on postal history. It was built in 2003 by the Department of Highways with a budget of six million baht and completed in 2010.

== See also ==
- Siamese revolution of 1932
- Bangkok General Post Office
- Thai Philatelic Museum
