= Creative Economy Agency =

Creative Economy Agency refers to:

- Creative Economy Agency (Indonesia), established in 2015
- Creative Economy Agency (Thailand), established in 2018
