= Cloud 11 =

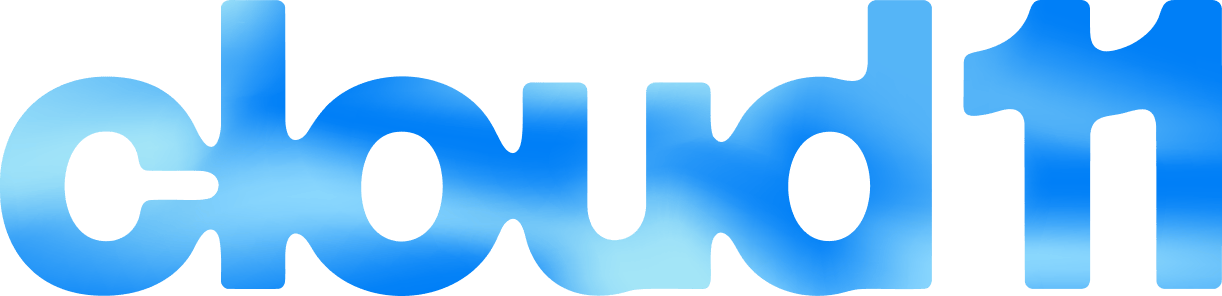

- Opening: 2025

Companies
- Developer: Magnolia Quality Development Corporation
- Manager: Paul Sirisant

Cloud 11 (Thai: คลาวด์ 11) is a 40 billion Baht mixed-use development opened in 2025 in Phra Khanong district in the South Sukhumvit area of Bangkok, Thailand, developed by Magnolia Quality Development Corporation (MQDC). The development includes a public park.

The development's CEO is Paul Sirisant.

== Location ==
The development is located on 27 rai of land on Sukhumvit Road near Udomsuk and Punnawithi BTS stations.
