= Wat Prayurawongsawat =

19th-century Buddhist temple complex in Bangkok, Thailand

Coordinates: 13.7372°N 100.4958°E

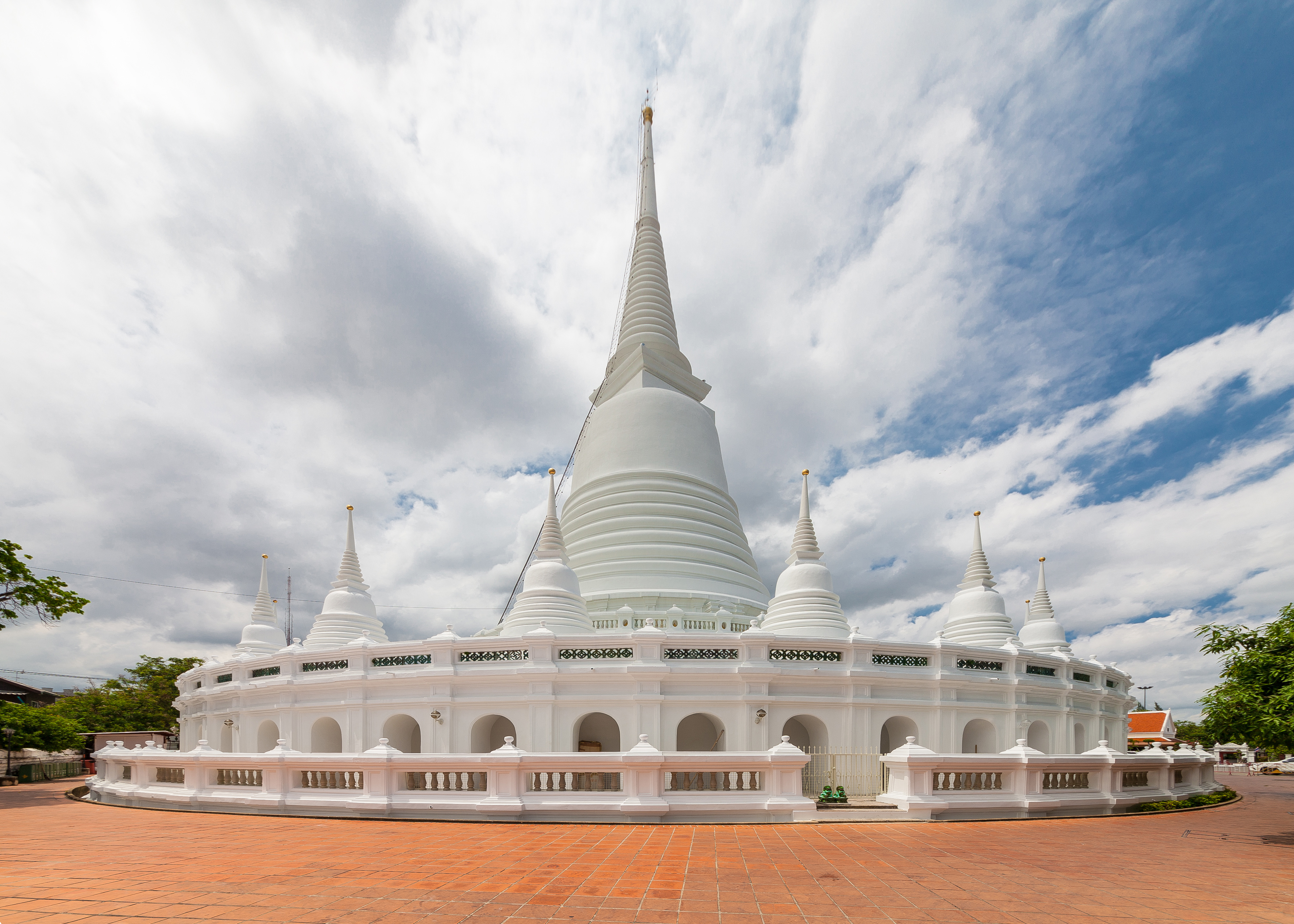
Main stupa of Wat Prayurawongsawat Worawihan.

Wat Prayurawongsawat Worawihan, known in short as Wat Prayun is a 19th century Buddhist temple complex, located near the Memorial Bridge (Thonburi side) in Bangkok, Thailand.

== History ==
The temple was built during the reign of King Rama III of the Thai Rattanakosin Kingdom. He was the king of Siam from 1824–1851. Rama III was the elder brother of Mongkut who succeeded him as King Rama IV in 1851. Rama IV became famous beyond Thailand, after being portrayed in The King and I film and stage productions.

Somdet Chao Phraya Borom Maha Prayurawongse (Tish Bunnag) dedicated his own coffee estate to build a royal temple. Hence the name "Prayurawongsawat" in his honour.

Wat Prayurawongsawat Worawihan is a "second class level" of royal temples.

The fair to celebrate temple's 190th anniversary was held in January 2018.

Moreover, at the Chao Phraya River in front of the temple during the Ayutthaya period, it was believed as the stop of Zheng He's fleets when he traveled to Siam at the mouth of Chao Phraya River.

== Visiting ==
- Main Stupa, an ancient white stupa of the temple build in the reign of King Mongkut, inside contains the Buddha's relics. This stupa receives UNESCO Cultural Heritage Conservation Award of Excellence in 2013.
- Khao Mo, a replica mountain of temple is located in the middle of the large pond. It is a rock garden surrounded by a number of miniature chedis and stupas, cathedrals, pavilion, and rare plants. It has been a place of peace and tranquility in the monastery for more than 180 years. The word "Khao Mo" derives from the Khmer word “t’mor” meaning rock. It was created as a representative of cosmic mountain Mount Meru. It is considered the largest and oldest replica mountain in Thailand. In the pond around this replica mountain is also the habitat of turtles and soft-shelled turtles as well. In Buddhism, turtles are sacred animals. Common Buddhism beliefs dictate that restraint should be made against killing this animal. It has led to the ceremony of releasing the turtles. In Buddhism, turtles represent creation, endurance, strength and longevity. And for this reason, this temple has an unofficial name for general person "Wat Khao Tao" ("turtle mountain temple"). Khao Mo is registered as an ancient monument by the Fine Arts Department in 1979.
- Three-cannons monument, the three downward-facing cannons on the white pedestal. It was created as a memorial to the first surgical event in Siam (now's Thailand) by American missionary Dan Beach Bradley that occurred at this temple in the 1836. It was erected as a memorial to those who lost their lives in an accident caused by the explosion of a cannon that was used for a firework display during a celebration at the temple. The accident resulted in seven deaths and a number of casualties.
- Phra Prayu Phantakhan Museum, the Buddha images museum was originally a dhamma studies hall. It was built in 1885 as a place for monks and novices to study Buddhist scriptures. Later in 1916, the former Ministry of Public Instruction used this hall as the first public library in Thailand. In 2007, ancient relics of the Buddha and antiquities were discovered, as a result, Buddha’s relics from Sri Lanka was enshrined here, along with Buddha images and Buddhist amulets which were excavated.

== Gallery ==
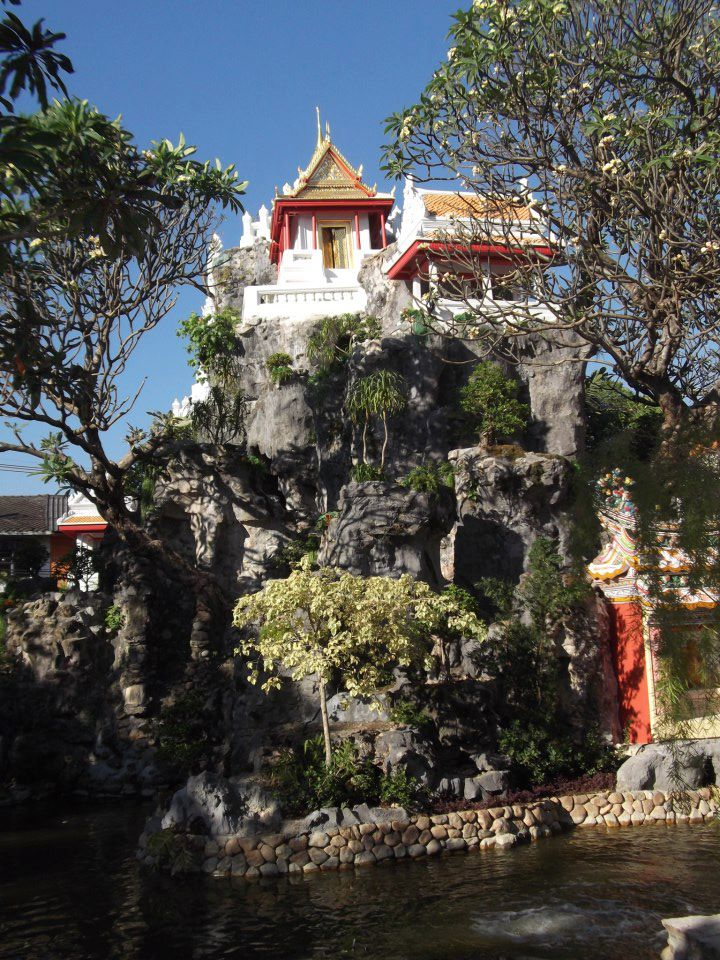
Khao Mo.

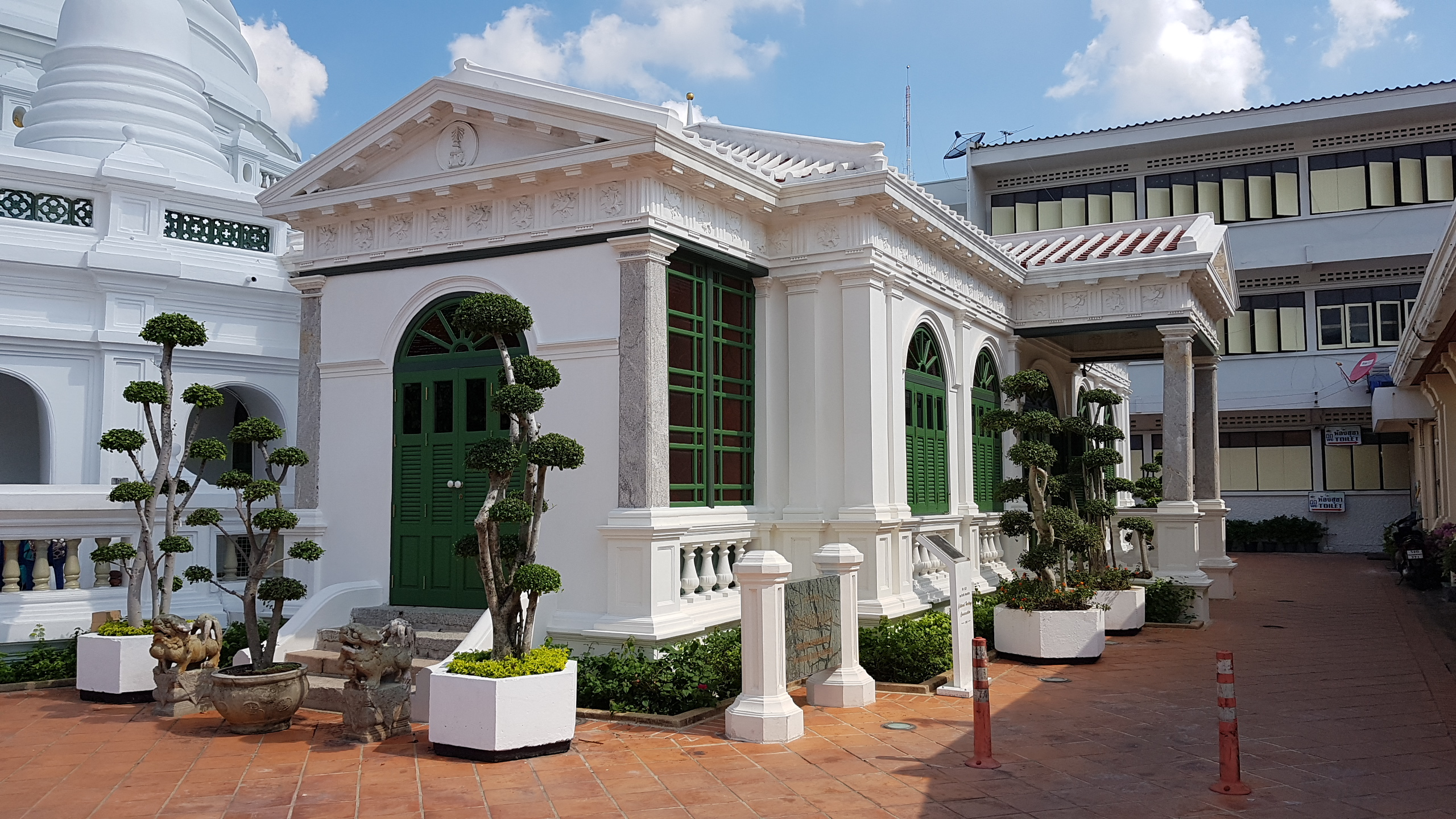
Phra Prayu Phantakhan Museum.

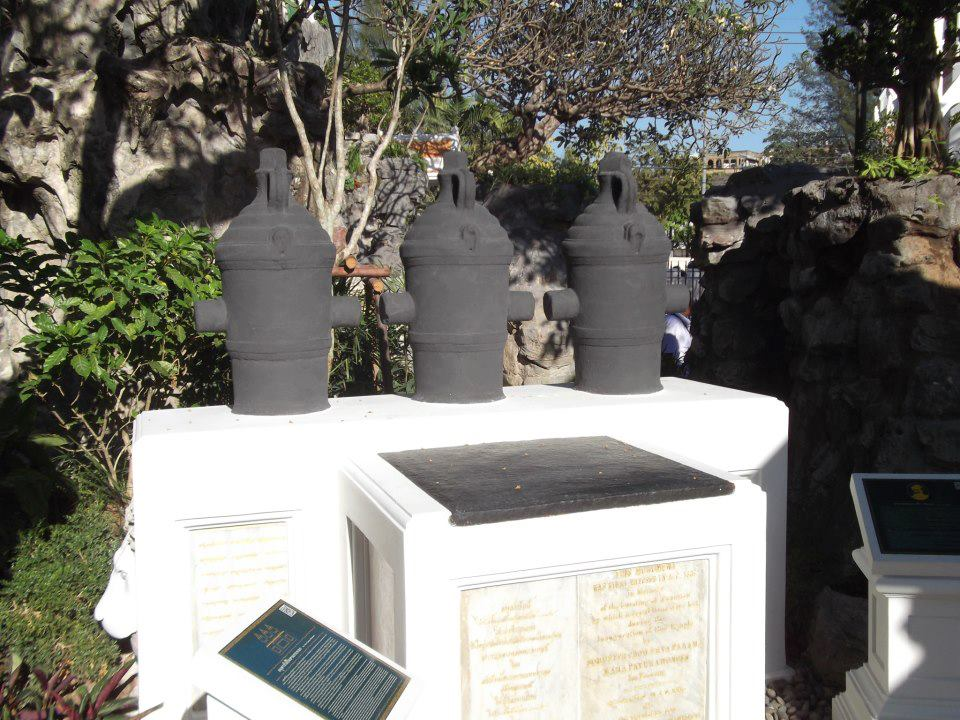
Three-cannons monument.

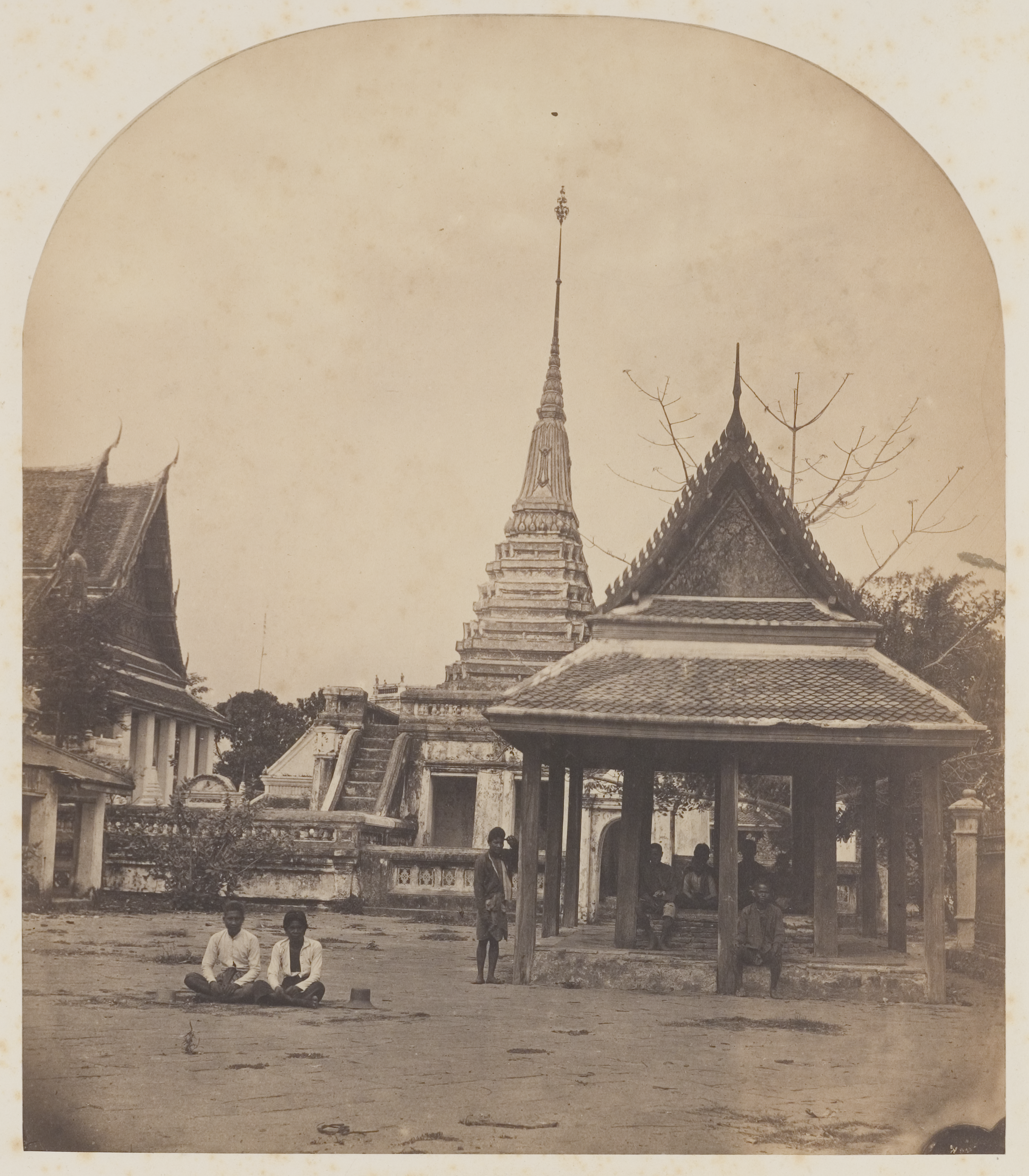
Albumen photo, "Courtyard of Wat Prayunwongsawat (1862)", by Isidore van Kinsbergen

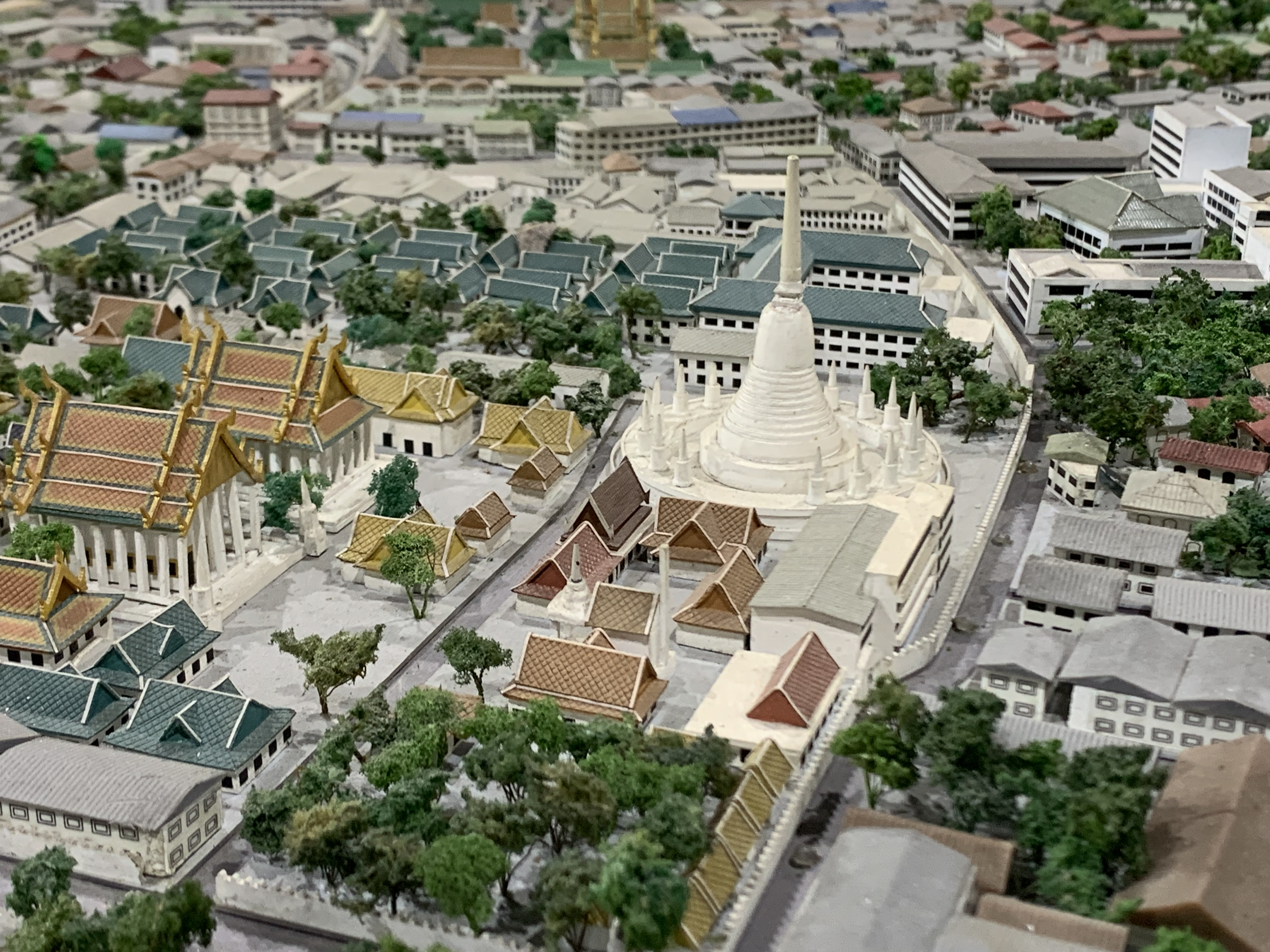
Wat Prayurawongsawat seen in the Bangkok Scale Model of BMA
