= Urban Design and Development Center =

- ศูนย์ออกแบบและพัฒนาเมือง
- Formation: March 2013; 13 years ago
- Key people: Niramon Serisakul (director)
- Parent organization: Chulalongkorn University

The Urban Design and Development Center (UddC; Thai: ศูนย์ออกแบบและพัฒนาเมือง) is a research center at Chulalongkorn University in Bangkok, Thailand, established to manage urban regeneration and restoration projects.

== History ==
The UddC was established in March 2013 as a partnership between Chulalongkorn University and the Thai Health Promotion Foundation.

The center has partnered with the Bangkok Metropolitan Administration (BMA) to design parks and public spaces in Bangkok, including the Chao Phraya Sky Park.

In 2024, UddC developed plans for Bangkok's South Sukhumvit innovation district.

== Leadership ==
=== Niramon Serisakul ===
Niramon Serisakul (née Kulsrisombat; Thai: นิรมล เสรีสกุล) is a Thai urban planner and director of the Urban Design and Development Center. Niramon has commented extensively on the importance of walkability and role urban design plays in addressing health, particularly in the context of Bangkok.

In 2013, she became director and co-founder of the Urban Design and Development Center (UDDC). The UDDC has subsequently led urban design projects in collaboration with the Bangkok Metropolitan Administration (BMA), including the Yannawa Riverfront Project, Bangkok 250 Project, and GoodWalk Thailand Project.

In 2017, following the announcement of the Bangkok Metropolitan Administration's street clearing campaign, Niramon spoke of the importance of street food within Bangkok's social fabric. She also expressed support for the implementation of road diets in Bangkok to expand pedestrian space.

In 2018, Niramon led the CU2040 Masterplan for Chulalongkorn University's property.

Niramon was the project leader for the Chao Phraya Sky Park, an elevated park crossing the Chao Phraya River. She was a critic of the Chong Nonsi Canal Park project. In 2021, Niramon led the master planning for the Phra Khanong-Bang Na area, including land development, canal planning, and creation of parks and walking areas.
