= Office of Knowledge Management and Development =

- สำนักงานบริหารและพัฒนาองค์ความรู้

Agency overview
- Formed: 2004
- Headquarters: Bangkok
- Annual budget: 790.60 million baht (FY2018)
- Agency executive: Porametee Vimolsiri, President
- Parent department: Office of the Prime Minister
- Website: www.okmd.or.th

The Office of Knowledge Management and Development (Public Organization) (Thai: สำนักงานบริหารและพัฒนาองค์ความรู้) is an autonomous public organization in Thailand reporting to the Office of the Prime Minister. It was established in 2004, and is tasked with promoting continuous learning and supporting the creativity industry. Among its constituent organizations are TK Park, the National Discovery Museum Institute and, until 2018, the Thailand Creative & Design Center.
