= Phra Pok Klao Bridge =

Phra Pok Klao Bridge สะพานพระปกเกล้า
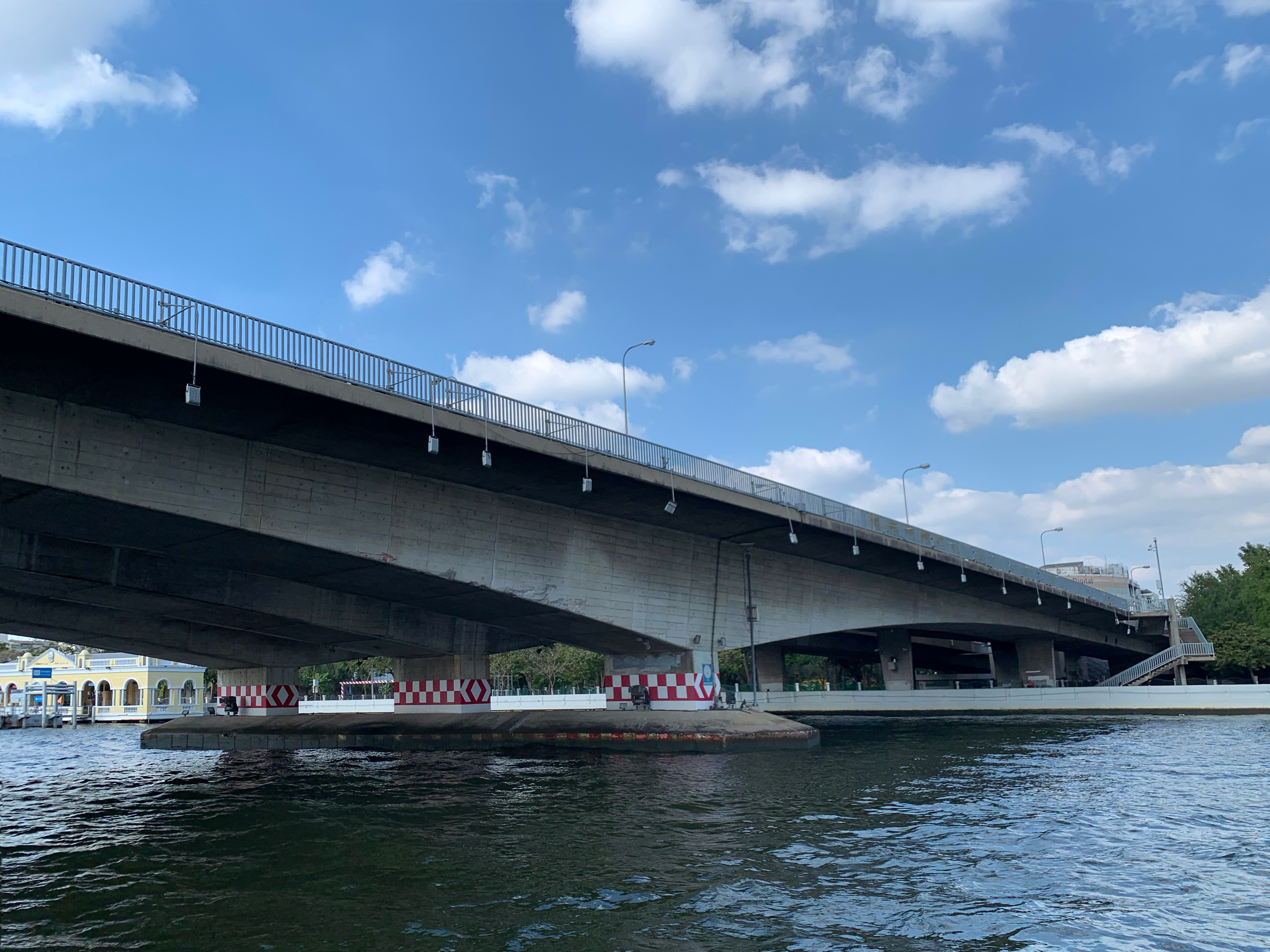
- Coordinates: 13.738999°N 100.498981°E
- Carries: 6 lanes of roadway
- Crosses: Chao Phraya River
- Locale: Bangkok, Thailand

Characteristics
- Total length: 745 m
- Longest span: 100 m
- Clearance below: 8.9 m

History
- Opened: December 3, 1984

Location
- Interactive map of Phra Pok Klao Bridge

Phra Pok Klao Bridge (Thai: สะพานพระปกเกล้า, RTGS: Saphan Phra Pokklao, pronounced [sā.pʰāːn pʰráʔ pòk.klâːw]) is a bridge crossing the Chao Phraya River in Bangkok, Thailand. It connects Phra Nakhon district's Wang Burapha Phirom and Samphanthawong district's Chakkrawat on the North end with Khlong San district's Somdet Chao Phraya as well as Thon Buri district's Wat Kanlaya on the south end. The bridge is the location of Chao Phraya Sky Park, The first sky park in Southeast Asia

== History ==
Phra Pok Klao Bridge was built in 1982 on the 200th anniversary of Rattanakosin or Bangkok nowadays. The bridge was designed to alleviate traffic congestion on the adjacent Memorial Bridge. The bridge is composed of three viaducts, with the central viaduct designed to carry future mass transit links. The bridge was named after King Prajadhipok (Rama VII) since he was the builder of the nearby Memorial Bridge.

In June 2020, the central viaduct intended to be the structure of the failed Lavalin Skytrain project was converted into Chao Phraya Sky Park, the first sky park in Southeast Asia.
