= Creative Economy Agency (Thailand) =

Creative Economy Agency (Public Organization)
- สำนักงานส่งเสริมเศรษฐกิจสร้างสรรค์ (องค์การมหาชน)

Organization overview
- Formed: 2018
- Type: Public organization
- Jurisdiction: Government of Thailand
- Headquarters: Grand Postal Building, Bangkok, Thailand
- Organization executive: Chakrit Pichyangkul, Executive Director
- Child Organization: Thailand Creative & Design Center
- Website: www.cea.or.th

The Creative Economy Agency (Public Organization) (CEA, Thai: สำนักงานส่งเสริมเศรษฐกิจสร้างสรรค์ (องค์การมหาชน)), is a Thai public organization established by the Thai government in 2018 which is tasked with the support and development of the creative economy in Thailand.

It focuses on local economic development by providing infrastructure and facilitating knowledge exchange in communities. It also tries to establish and support "creative districts". The agency oversees the Thailand Creative District Network, the Thailand Creative & Design Center (TCDC), and other creative city initiatives throughout the country. It also organizes the annual Bangkok Design Week, Chiang Mai Design Week, and Pakk Taii Design Week in Songkhla.

== History ==
Thailand began making plans to use the creative economy to overcome the middle-income trap in the 2000-2010 decade. In 2016, it launched a 20-year plan titled "Thailand 4.0" which among other things focused on the creative economy, creative hubs, and creative districts. The intended end goal was for cities to join the UNESCO Creative Cities Network. The CEA was established in 2018 to carry out this plan.

=== Thailand Creative & Design Center ===
The government led by Pol. Lt. Col. Thaksin Shinawatra established the TCDC.

The TCDC was established in September 2003 as a specialized agency under the supervision of Office of Knowledge Management and Development, a Thai public organization. It was established according to the Royal Decree Establishing the Office of Knowledge Management and Development B.E. 2547

Currently, the Thailand Creative & Design Center (TCDC) is a government agency under the Creative Economy Agency (Public Organization) which operates under the Office of the Prime Minister. It was established by royal decree "Establishing the Creative Economy Promotion Agency (Public Organization) B.E. 2561".

== Thailand Creative & Design Center ==
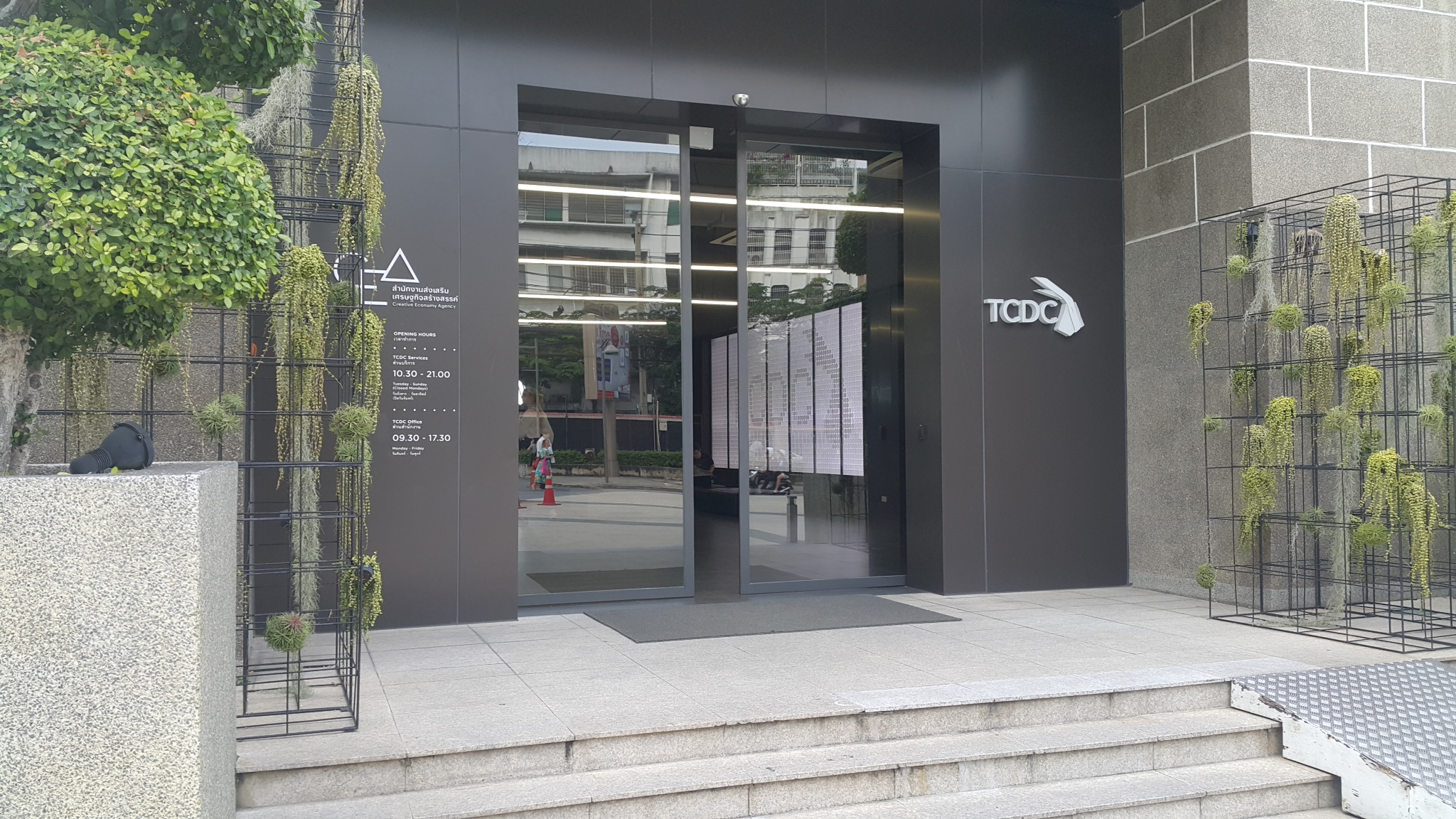
TCDC Office at Grand Postal Building

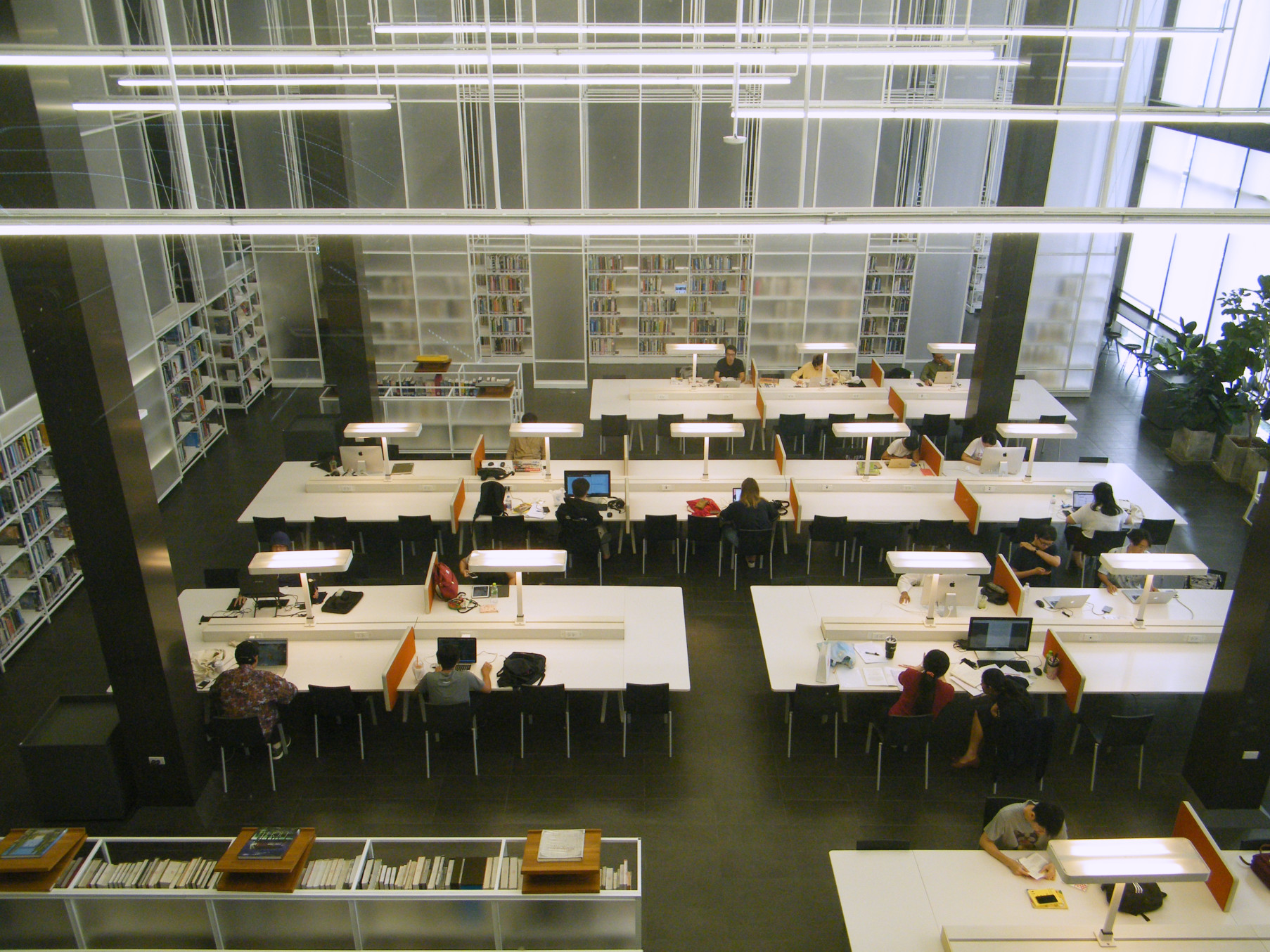
Resource Center library floor at the TCDC's Grand Postal Building headquarter

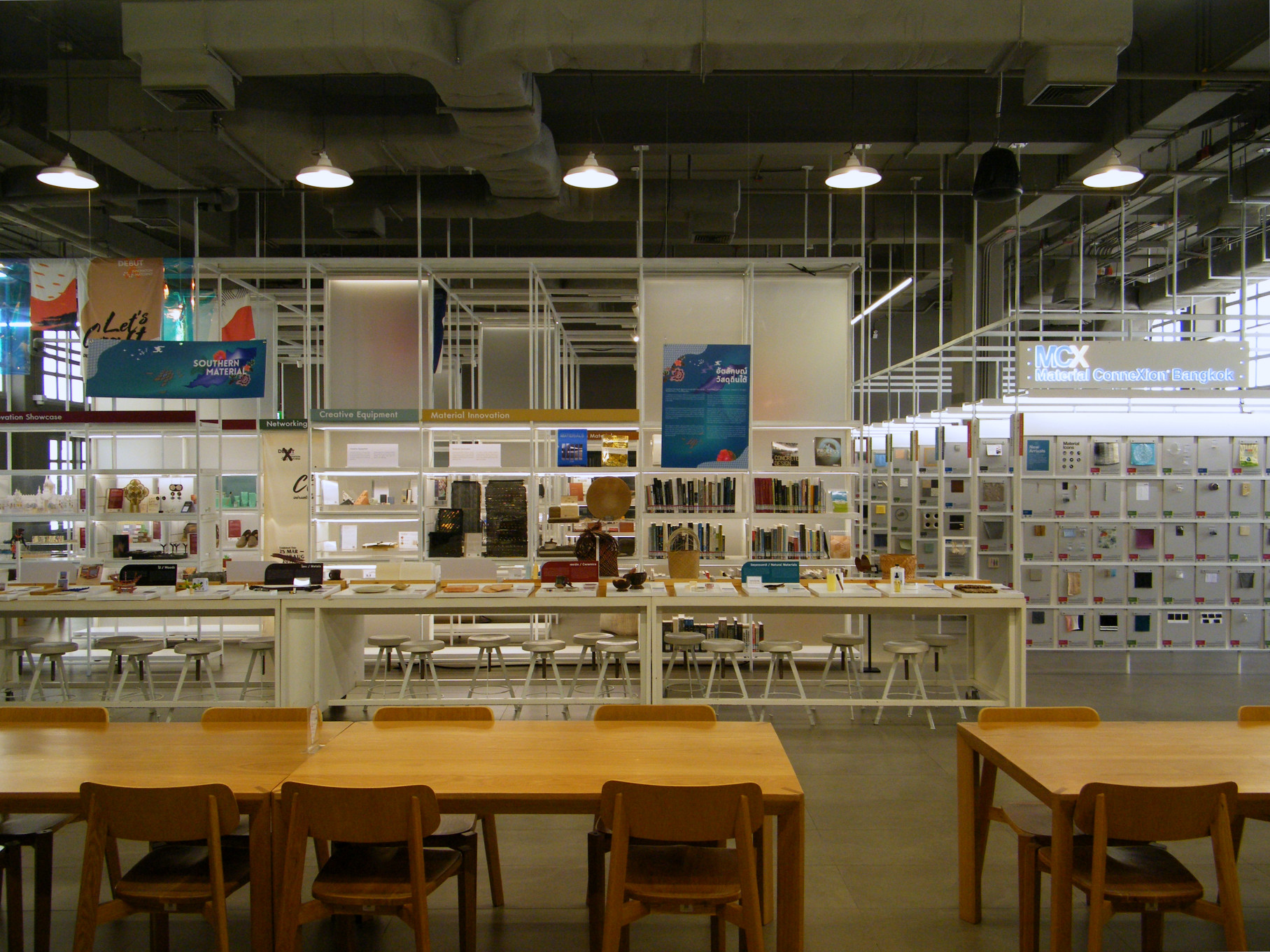
Material library floor at the TCDC's Grand Postal Building headquarter, featuring Material ConneXion Bangkok exhibition

Thailand Creative & Design Center (TCDC, Thai: ศูนย์สร้างสรรค์การออกแบบ) is a public resource center in Thailand focused on the design and creative industries. It was founded in 2004 as part of the Office of Knowledge Management and Development, a government-owned public organization, and opened on 14 November 2005. Its oversight was transferred to the newly created Creative Economy Agency in 2018.

The national geographic described it as a kind of "hipster haven" where local creatives can connect in co-working spaces and sound studios.

The main objective of TCDC is to facilitate access to knowledge for Thai residents, as well as inspiring Thai people to be creative through workshops, activities and inspirations from the successful designers worldwide. TCDC also focuses on working with Thai SME start-ups and designers, mainly by creating awareness of the value of creative businesses and designs. At the same time, TCDC also helps promote Thai designers on the international market.

TCDC's headquarters, and its resource center, is located in the Grand Postal Building in Bangrak District, Bangkok. Its branches include Emporium (in co-operation with AIS under the name of AIS.D.C.) and Ideo-Q Samyan. TCDC also has regional centers in Chiang Mai and Khon Kaen.

== Design weeks ==
=== Bangkok ===
Bangkok Design Week (BKKDW) (Thai: เทศกาลงานออกแบบกรุงเทพฯ) is an annual event held to celebrate and promote design and creativity in Bangkok, Thailand. Supported by the Creative Economy Agency and Bangkok Metropolitan Administration, the event was inaugurated in 2018 by the Thailand Creative & Design Center. In 2022, UNESCO designated Bangkok as 'Creative City of Design'.

The inaugural 2018 Bangkok Design Week was hosted under the theme "The New-ist Vibes", seeking to promote local creative businesses across five areas: Charoen Krung, Klong San, Sam Yan, Rama 1 and Sukhumvit. In 2024, the event was hosted under the theme "Livable Scape: The More We Act, the Better Our City”, seeking to improve public infrastructure and utilities in Bangkok. The 2025 event will be hosted under the theme "Design Up+Rising".

=== Chiang Mai ===
Chiang Mai Design Week (Thai: เทศกาลงานออกแบบเชียงใหม่) is an annual event held to celebrate and promote design and creativity in Chiang Mai, Thailand. Supported by the Creative Economy Agency, it was Thailand's first design week. In 2017, UNESCO designated Chiang Mai as a Crafts and Folk Art Creative Cities Network.

The inaugural event was held 6 - 14 December, 2014 by the Thailand Creative & Design Center. In 2021, the event was hosted under the theme "Co-Forward" during the COVID-19 pandemic. In 2023, the event was hosted under the theme "Transforming Local: Adapt / Enhance / Local / Grow". The 2024 event will be hosted under the theme "Scaling Local: Creativity, Technology, Sustainability".

=== Pakk Taii ===
Pakk Taii Design Week (Thai: เทศกาลงานออกแบบปักษ์ใต้) is an annual event held to celebrate and promote design and creativity in Southern Thailand. The inaugural event was launched in 2023 in Songkhla, Thailand, hosted under the theme "The Next Spring". “Pakk Taii” refers to Southern Thailand (Thai: ปักษ์ใต้; RTGS: phak tai). Supported by the Creative Economy Agency and the Tourism Authority of Thailand, Pakk Taii Design Week hosts events including live performances, workshops, music, creative markets, and talks focused on Southern Thailand's culture.

In 2024, the event was hosted under the theme "The South's Turn!", seeking to revitalize the region's economy. It also held the Microwave Film Festival, focused on Thai cinema. In 2025, the event was hosted in Hat Yai and Songkhla Old Town with the theme "South Paradise".
