= Memorial Bridge (Bangkok) =

Memorial Bridge สะพานปฐมบรมราชานุสรณ์
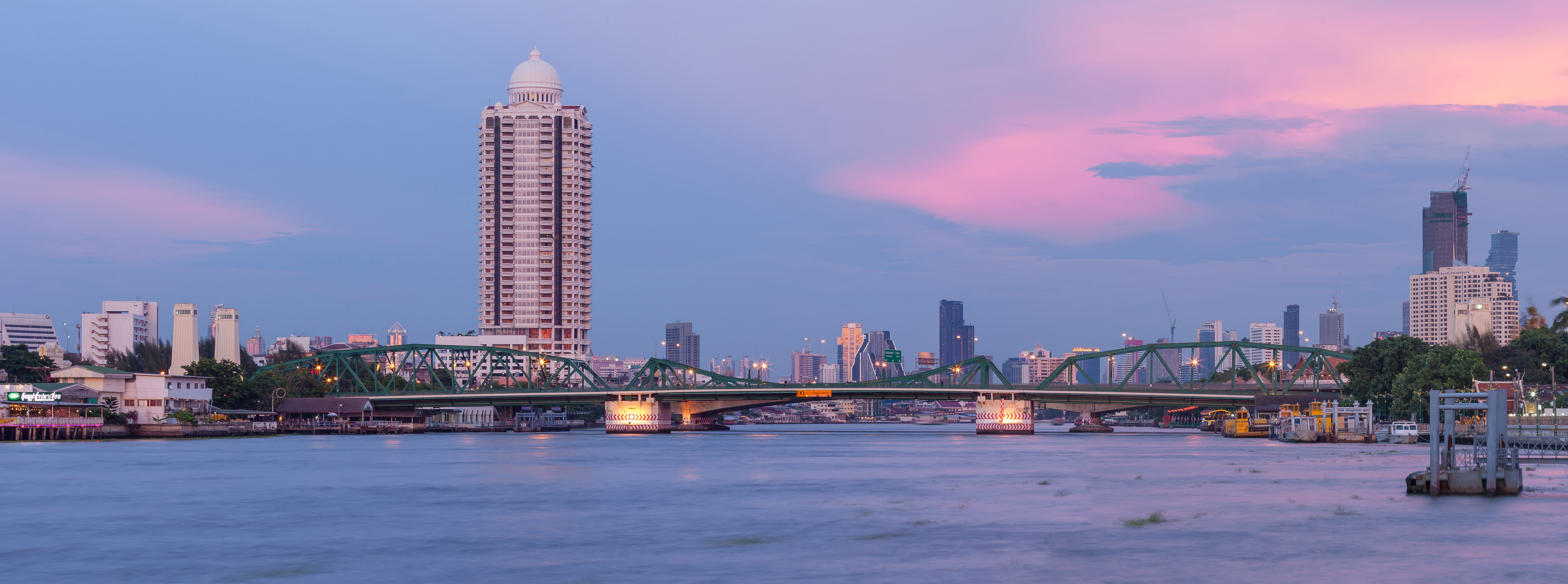
- Memorial Bridge with the Express Boat Pier
- Coordinates: 13°44′21″N 100°29′51″E
- Carries: 3 lanes of roadway, pedestrians
- Crosses: Chao Phraya River
- Locale: Bangkok, Thailand
- Official name: Memorial Bridge
- Other name(s): Phra Phuttayotfa Bridge; Phut Bridge
- Preceded by: Phra Pinklao Bridge
- Followed by: Phra Pok Klao Bridge

Characteristics
- Total length: 678 m
- Longest span: 78 m
- Clearance below: 7.3 m

History
- Opened: 6 April 1932

Location
- Interactive map of Memorial Bridge

The Memorial Bridge (Thai: สะพานปฐมบรมราชานุสรณ์) is a bascule bridge over the Chao Phraya River in Bangkok, Thailand, connecting the districts of Phra Nakhon and Thonburi.

== History ==
The bridge opened on 6 April 1932, by King Prajadhipok (Rama VII) in commemoration of the 150th anniversary of the Chakri dynasty and the foundation of Bangkok, shortly before the Siamese coup d'état of 24 June 1932. In English the bridge is commonly known as Memorial Bridge, however in Thai, it is most commonly known as Phra Phutthayotfa Bridge (สะพานพระพุทธยอดฟ้า), after King Phutthayotfa Chulalok (Rama I), the first king of the Chakri dynasty. The name is more commonly shortened as Saphan Phut (สะพานพุทธ) or Phut Bridge or Buddha Bridge (meaning: Bridge of Buddha).

Construction of the bridge was started on 3 December 1929 by Dorman Long, Middlesbrough, England, under the supervision of Italian technicians from SNOS (Società Nazionale Officine Savignano). The bridge used to have a double-leaf bascule-type lifting mechanism, which is now unused.

On 5 June 1944, as part of the bombing of Bangkok in World War II, a force of B-29 Superfortresses, in a test of their capabilities before being deployed against the Japanese home islands, targeted the bridge. Their bombs fell over two kilometers away, damaging no civilian structures, but downed some tram lines and destroyed a Japanese military hospital and the Japanese secret police headquarters. It was not until 1947 that Thai authorities learned of the intended target. Eventually, it was taken out by the Allies and rebuilt in 1949.

The entry ramp on the east side of the river contains Memorial Bridge Pier (N6) for the Chao Phraya Express Boat. Renovated in 2020 under the Marine Department's Smart Pier project, it features a blend of contemporary Thai and Western design. Passengers can enjoy clear views of the bridge and the nearby Chao Phraya Sky Park. Although there is a ticket booth, the pier has no on-site staff, and tickets are purchased directly on the boat.

A rapid transit station under construction, Memorial Bridge MRT station of the MRT Purple Line, is named after the bridge. However, it is located in the Thonburi side. (whereas the Memorial Bridge pier is located in Phra Nakhon side)

== Gallery ==
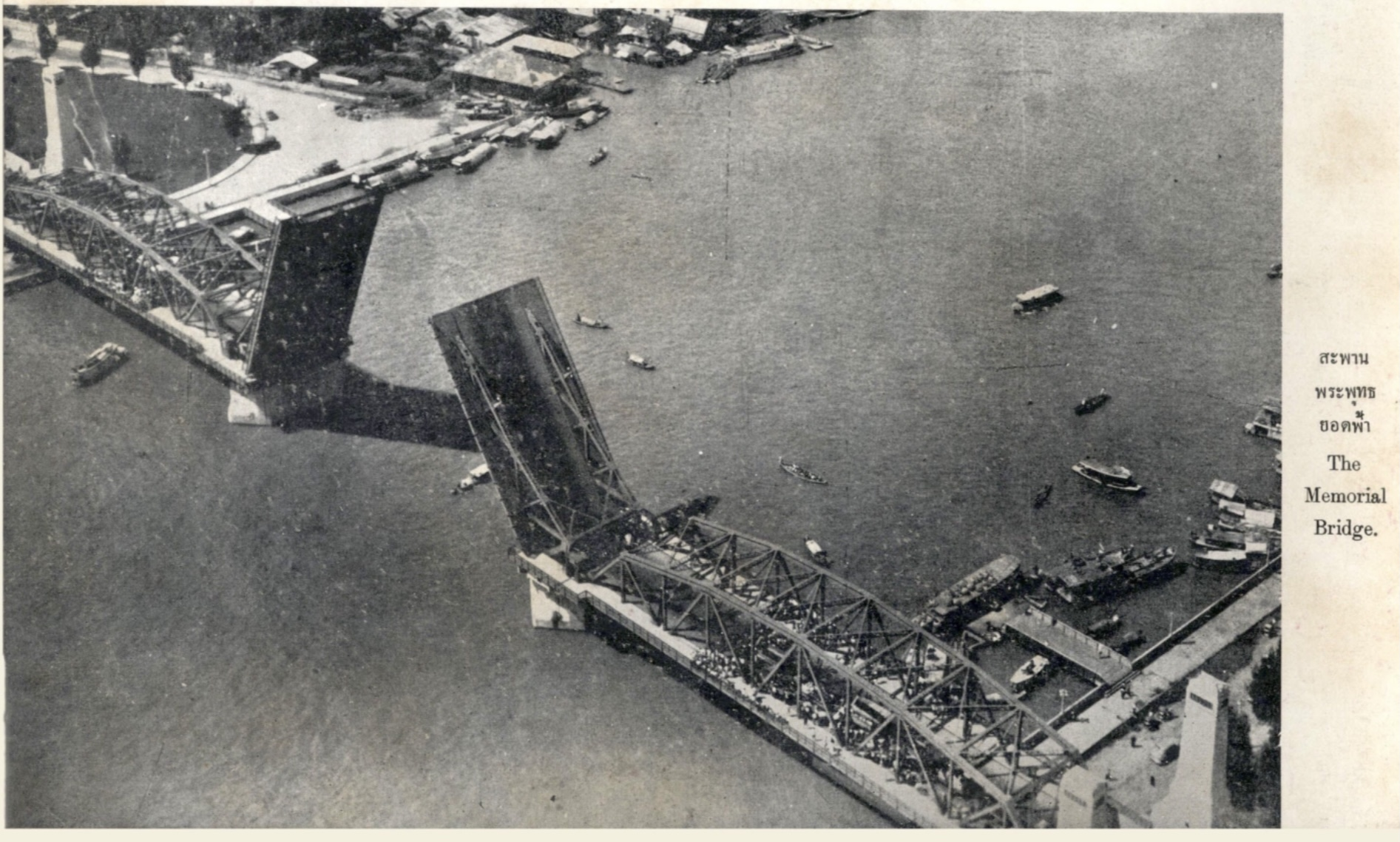

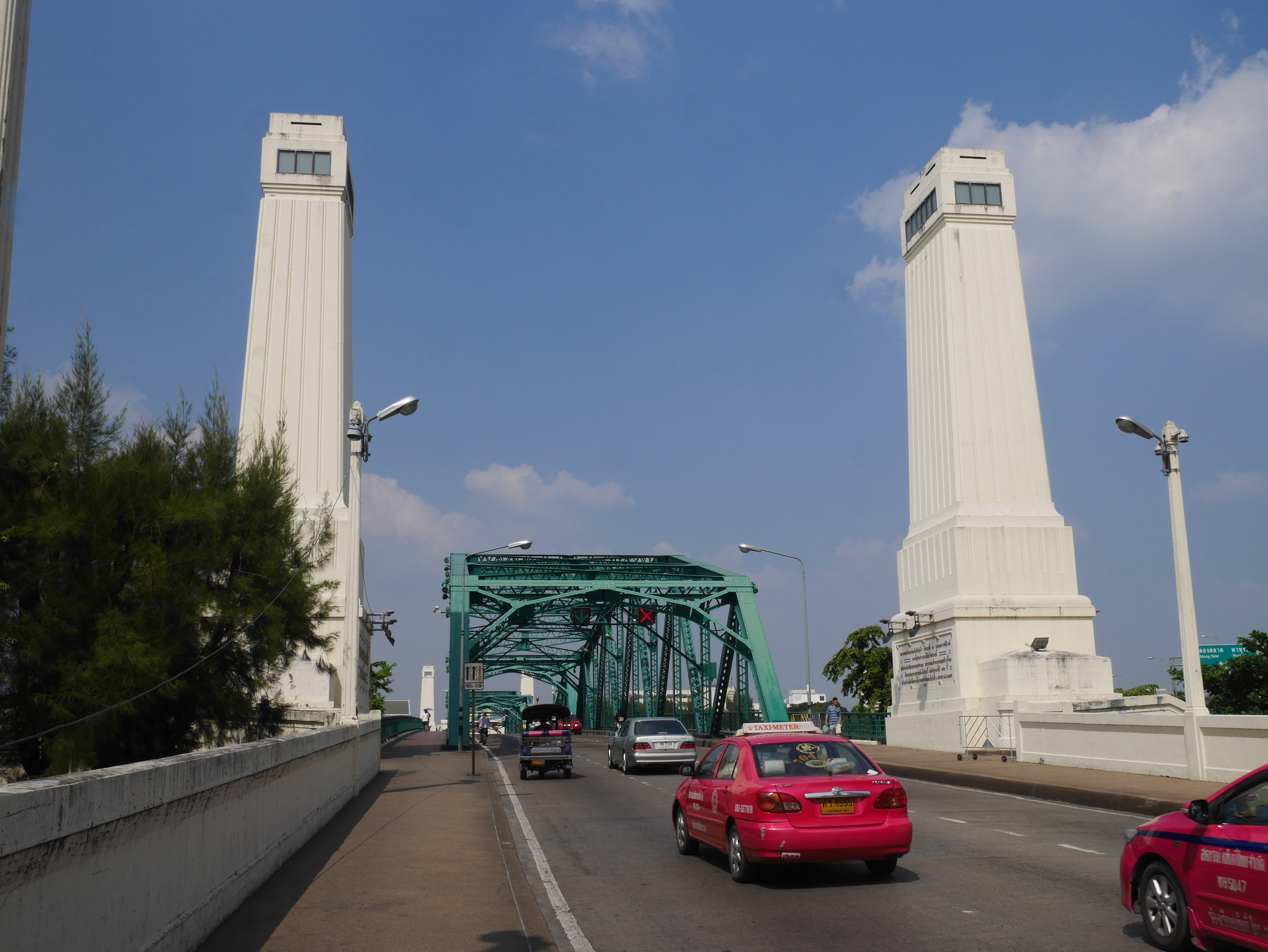

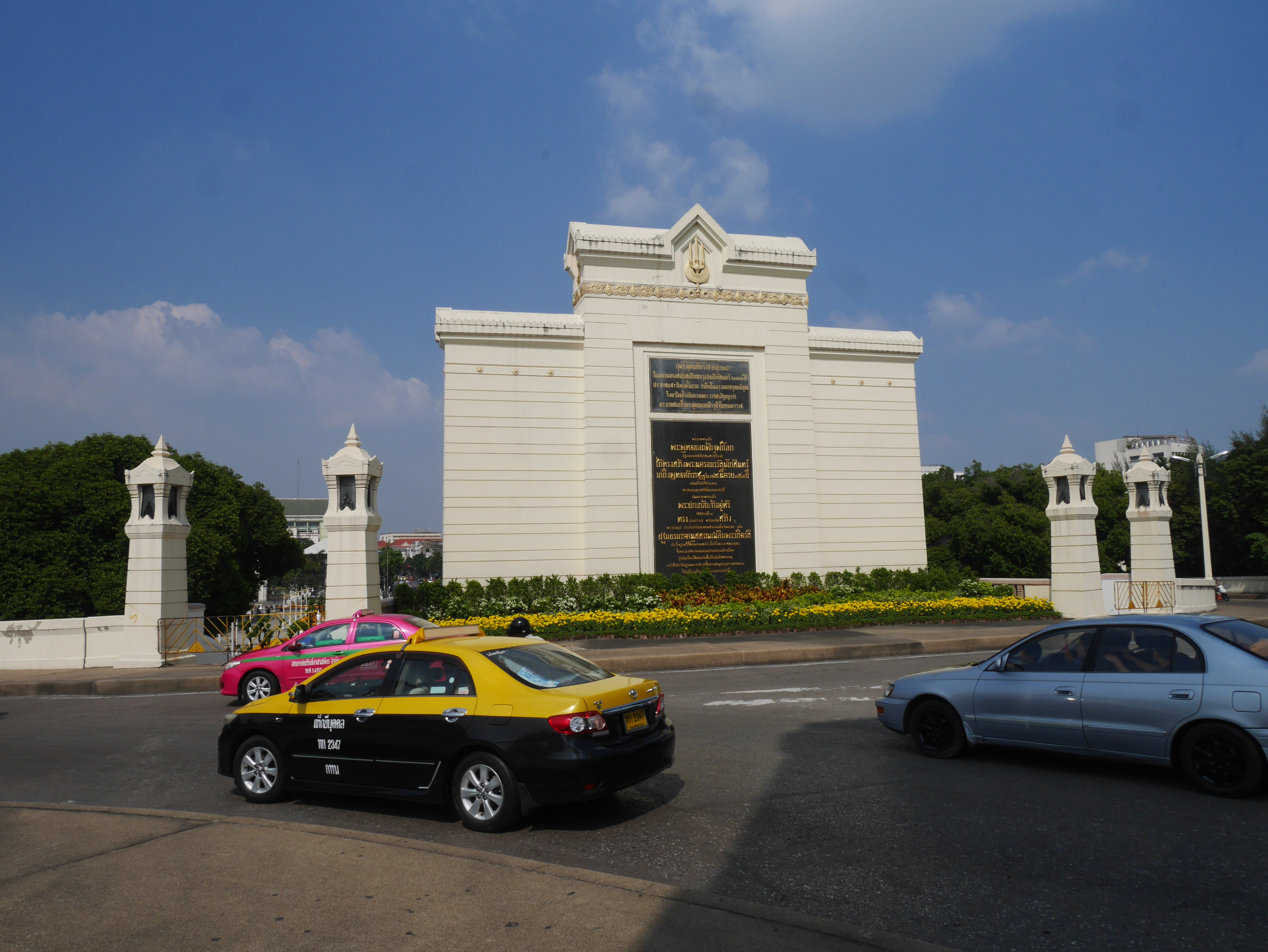

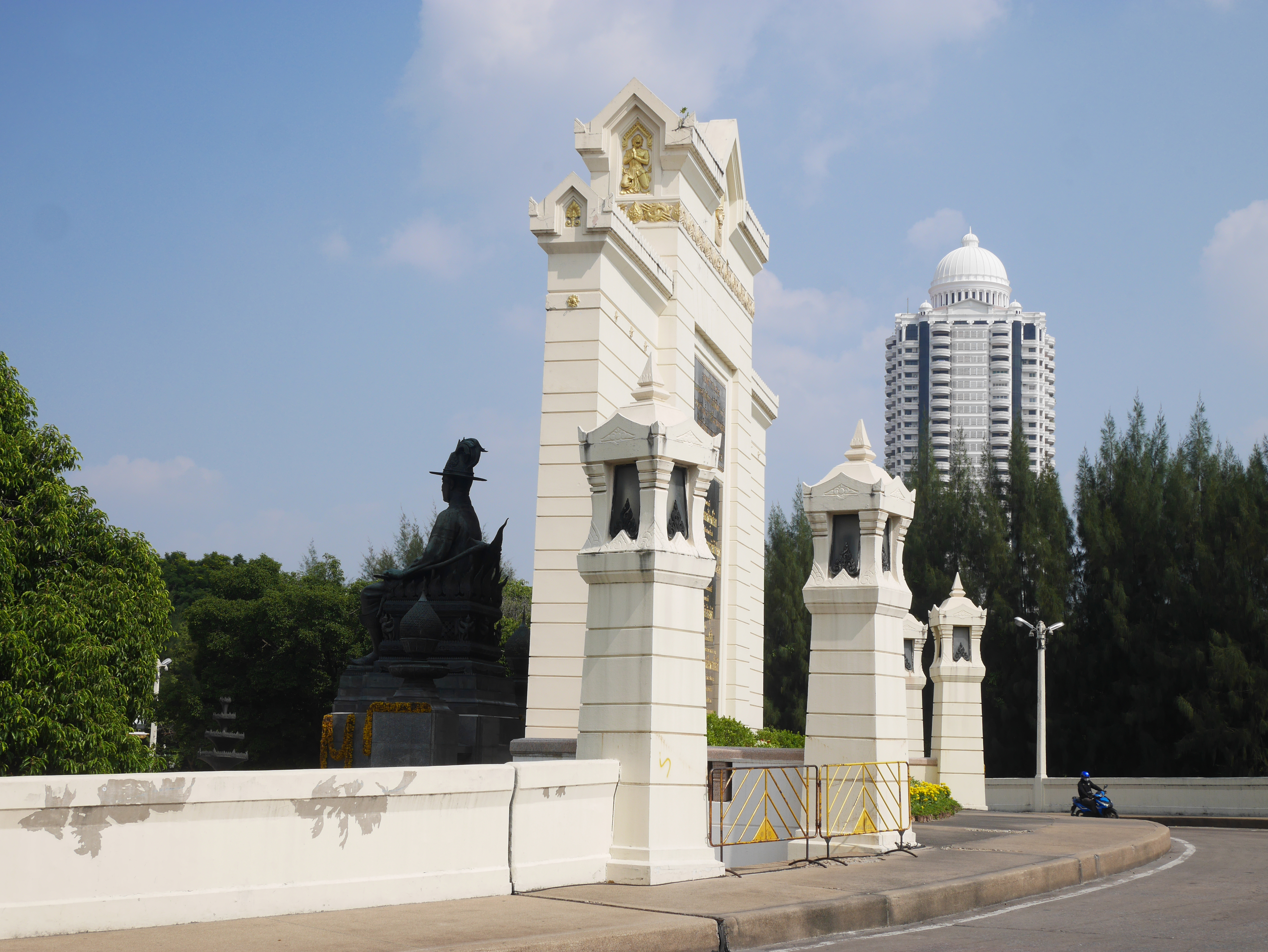

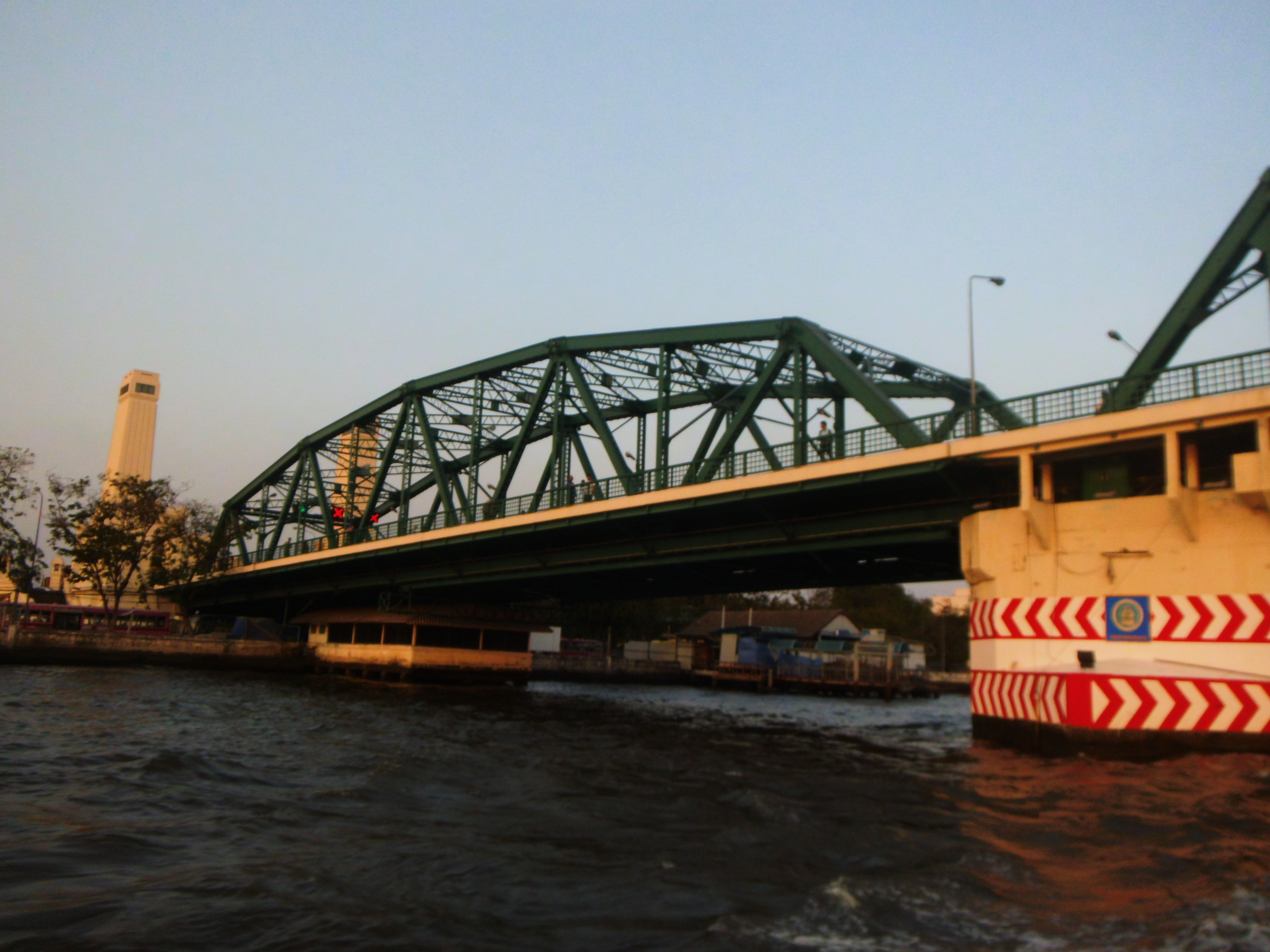

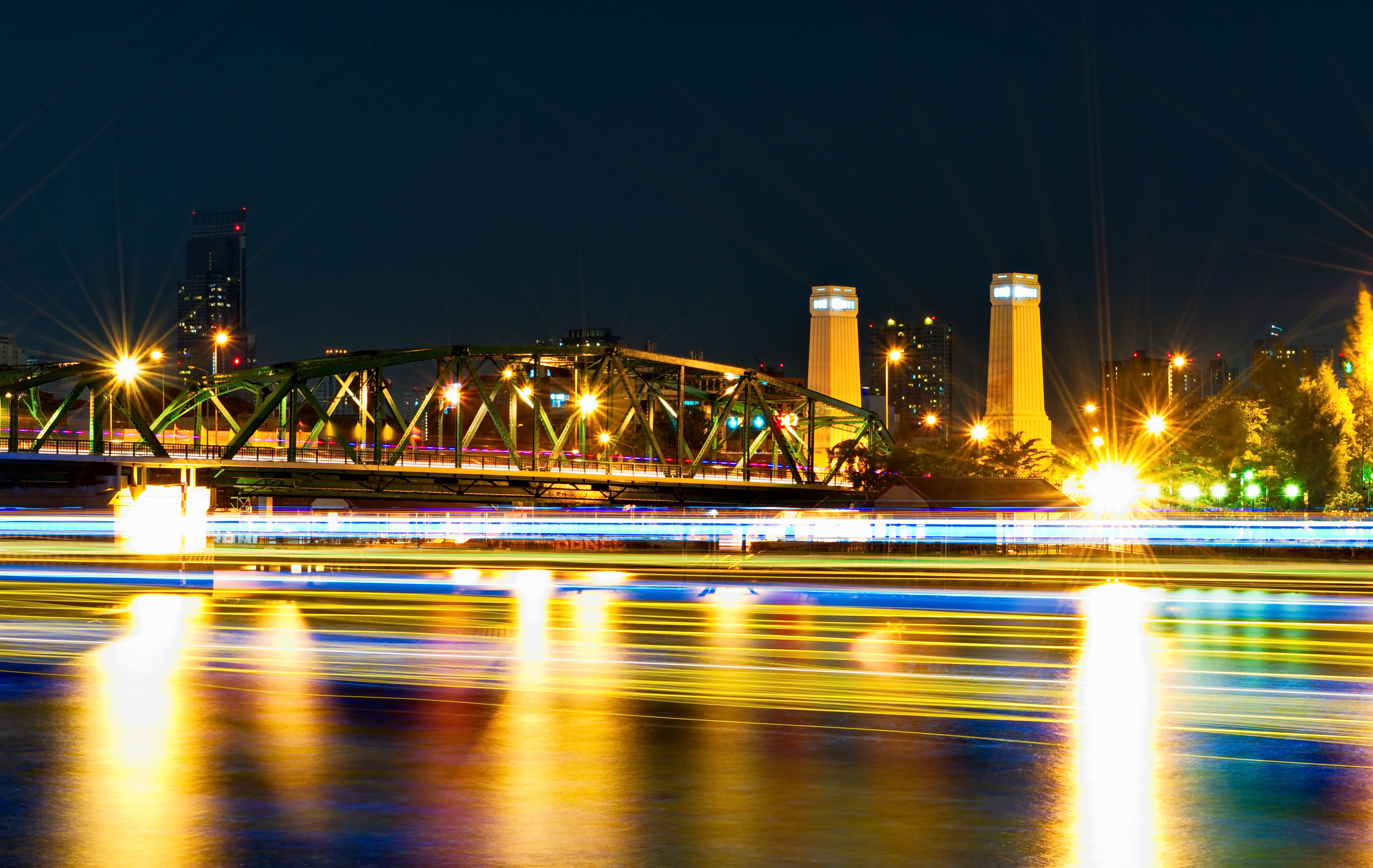
