= Pho Sam Ton, Bangkok =

Road intersection in Bangkok, Thailand

Coordinates: 13°44′25.58″N 100°29′02.02″E

Pho Sam Ton
- โพธิ์สามต้น
- Interactive map of Pho Sam Ton

Location
- Bangkok Yai, Bangkok, Thailand
- Roads at junction: Wang Doem (northeast); Itsaraphap (southwest-northwest)

Construction
- Type: Three-way junction

Pho Sam Ton (Thai: โพธิ์สามต้น, pronounced [pʰōː sǎːm tôn]) is a three-way junction between the Itsaraphap and Wang Doem Roads in the area of Wat Tha Phra and Wat Arun subdistricts in the Bangkok Yai district.

The name means "three Bodhi trees", commemorating the victory of King Taksin and King Rama I over the Burmese army in the Battle of Phosamton in November 1767. Pho Sam Ton was the site for the Burmese camp controlled by commanders Suki and Mongya. The Burmese army used the camp as a base to forcibly move the Siamese to Ava (now Inwa). However, King Taksin assailed the camp, which had been a strategic post, and won the war in 1767. The original site is now in Tambon Pho Sam Ton, Amphoe Bang Pahan, Phra Nakhon Si Ayutthaya Province, about 7km (4.35mi) North of Amphoe Phra Nakhon Si Ayutthaya.

Pho Sam Ton is often considered as the first junction along the Itsaraphap Road from Ban Khaek. In the 1990s, the intersection between Pho Sam Ton to Ban Khaek was home to a number of pubs, and was popular with young people and students. It was dubbed as "RCA 3".

The junction is close to Itsaraphap MRT station, Charoen Phat Bridge, Kudi Charoen Phat, Wat Sungagai, Plai Na Graveyard and Dhilfanlah Mosque.
