= Wat Arun subdistrict =

Coordinates: 13°44′29.3″N 100°29′09.9″E

Wat Arun วัดอรุณ
- Khwaeng
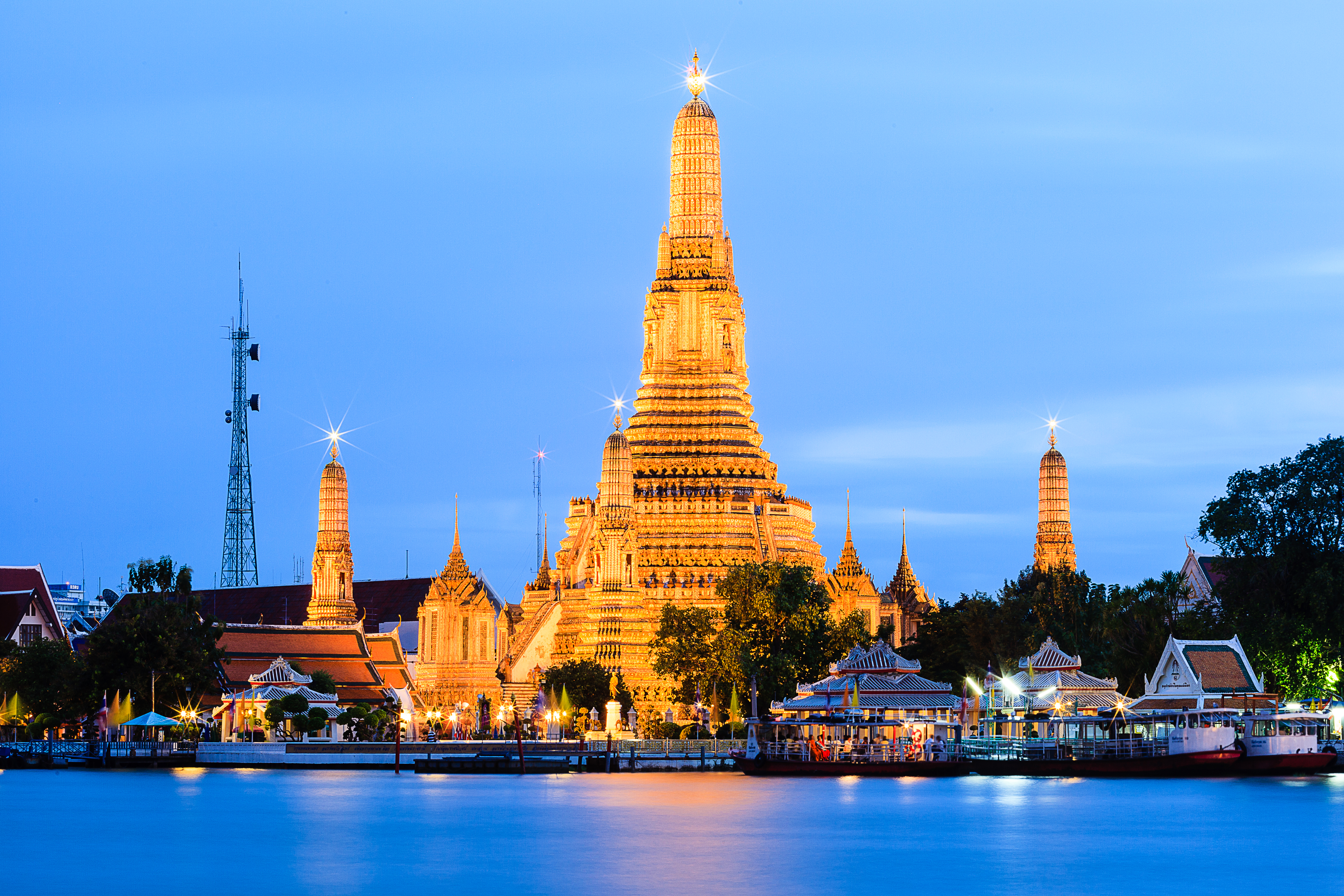
- The eponymous Wat Arun and its prang.

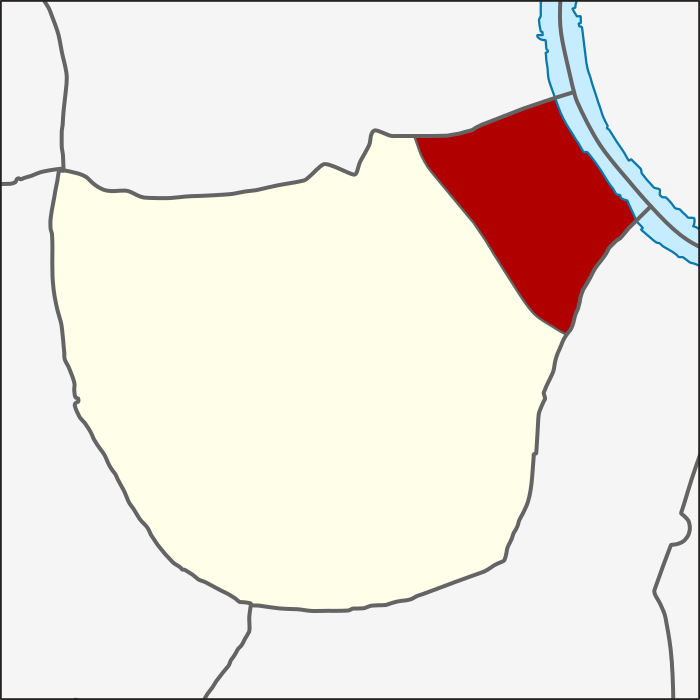
- Location in Bangkok Yai District
- Country: Thailand
- Province: Bangkok
- Khet: Bangkok Yai

Area
  - Total: 0.834 km^{2} (0.322 sq mi)

Population (2018)
  - Total: 14,100
  - Density: 16,906.47/km^{2} (43,787.6/sq mi)
- Time zone: UTC+7 (ICT)
- Postal code: 10600
- TIS 1099: 101601

Wat Arun (Thai: วัดอรุณ, pronounced [wát ʔā.rūn]) is one of two khwaeng (subdistrict) of Bangkok Yai District, Bangkok, apart from Wat Tha Phra. It can be considered an important area in terms of history and tourism.

== History ==
The area is named after Wat Arun, an ancient temple on the Chao Phraya River, the world's famous temple. Its striking prang (Khmer-style pagoda) became one of the important symbols and landmarks of Bangkok and Thonburi side, as well as being a seal of the Tourism Authority of Thailand (TAT).

It is said that when King Taksin returned from Chanthaburi to go to Ayutthaya with his fleets. He sailed along the Chao Phraya River and arrived at this temple at the time of the rising sun, hence the name "Wat Chaeng" or official name "Wat Arun", which means "Temple of Dawn".

When King Taksin established the new capital of Siam (now Thailand), Thonburi, on the left bank of the Chao Phraya River, where confluence of Khlong Bangkok Yai and Chao Phraya River, that is the current location here (including expanding to nearby areas were Bangkok Noi and Thon Buri Districts in present day). His palace was situated next to Wat Arun on the banks of Chao Phraya River, which it now has become part of the Royal Thai Navy Headquarters under the name Thonburi Palace.

Bangkok Yai District Office used to be located in the area of Wat Hong Rattanaram, another prominent temple in this subdistrict in the year 1915. Until the year 1988, it moved out to be situated at the current location is on Ratchadaphisek Road near Tha Phra Intersection in the area of Wat Tha Phra Subdistrict.

== Geography ==
Wat Arun is the eastern part of the district surrounded by water except on the west side, Itsaraphap Road is the dividing line between its area and Wat Tha Phra.

Neighbouring subdistricts are (from the north clockwise): Siriraj and Ban Chang Lo of Bangkok Noi District (across Khlong Mon), Phra Borom Maha Ratchawang of Phra Nakhon District (across Chao Phraya River), Wat Kanlaya of Thon Buri District (across Khlong Bangkok Yai), and Wat Tha Phra in its district.

== Places ==
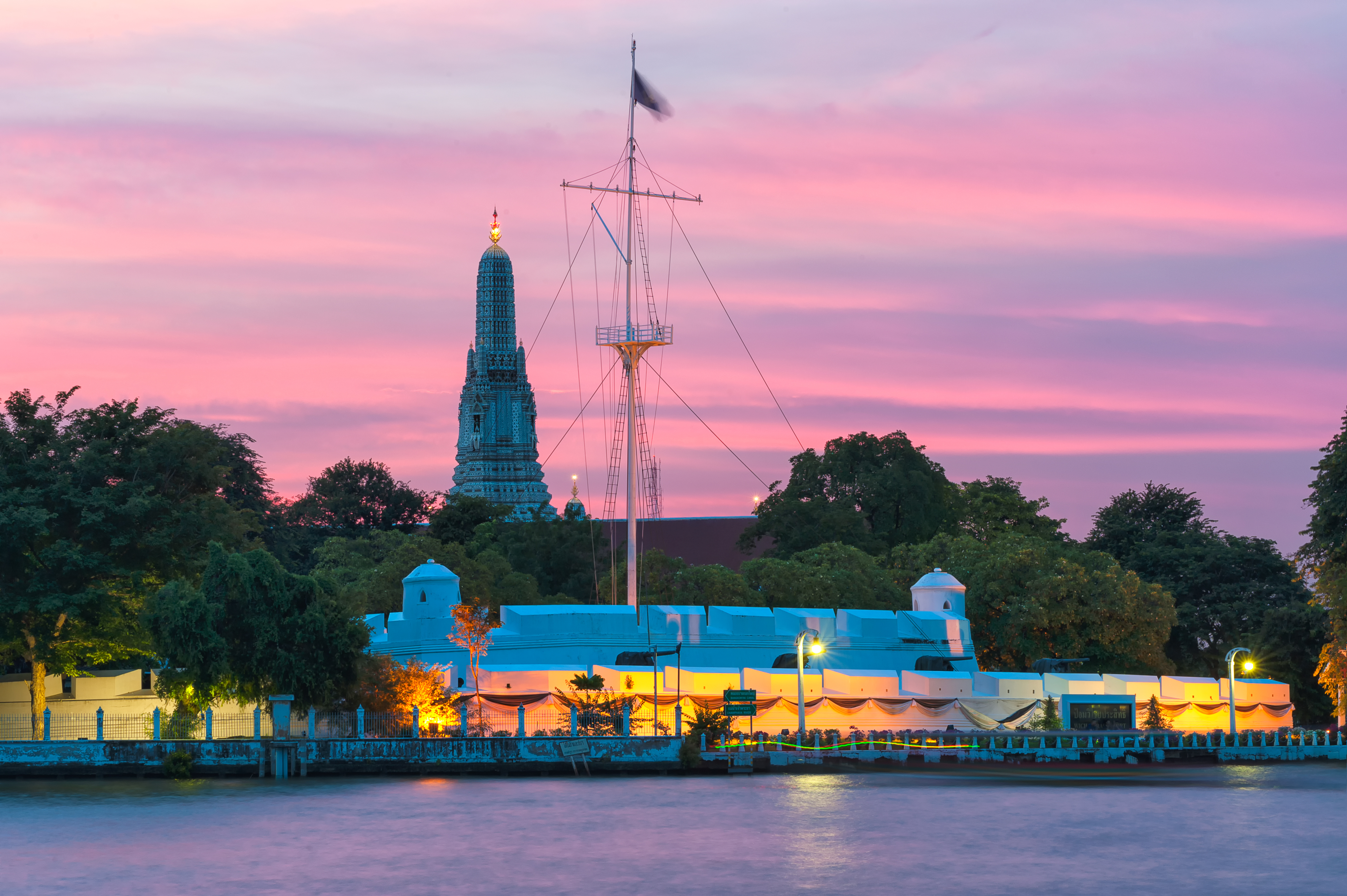
Wichai Prasit Fort.

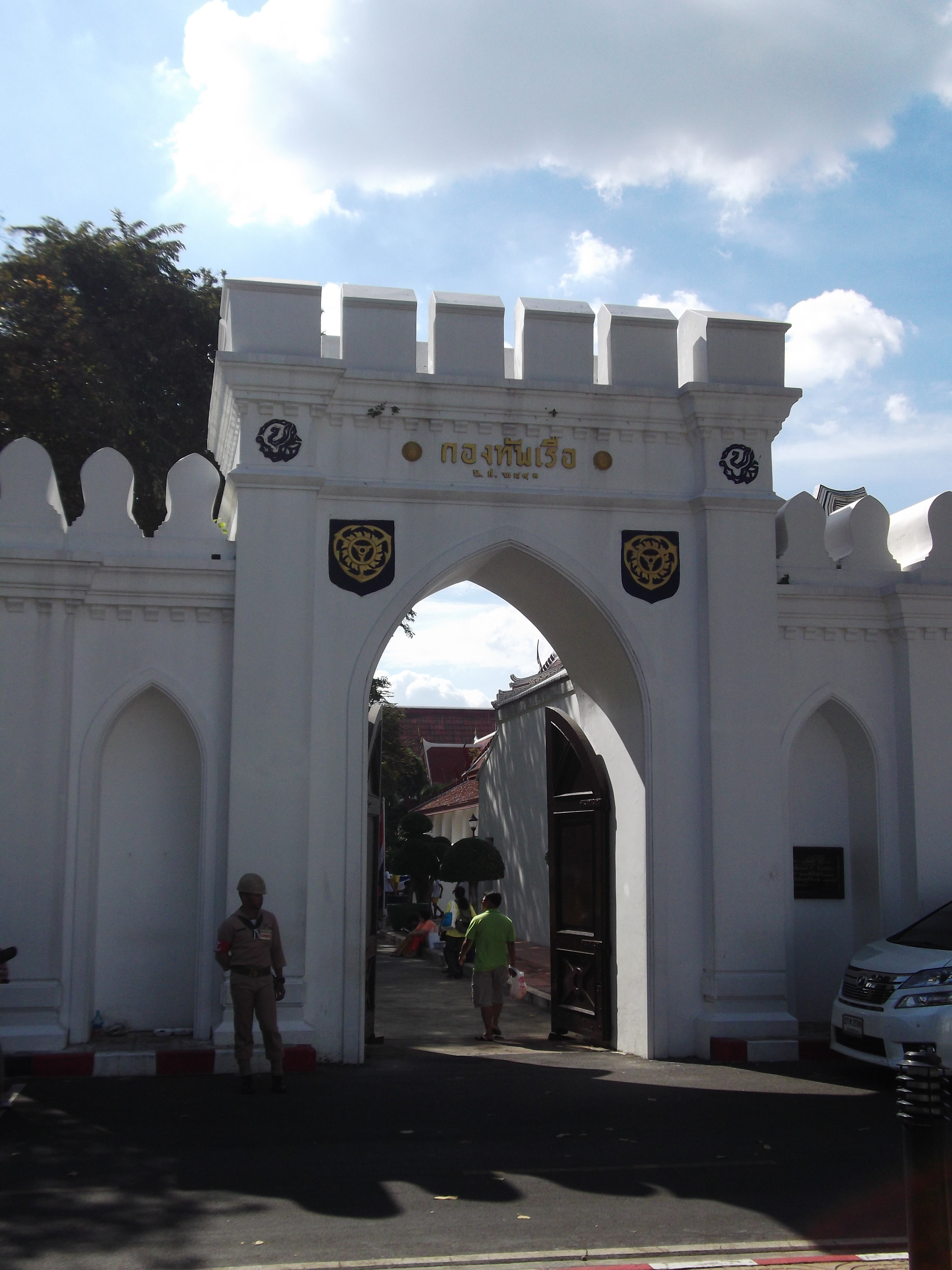
The gate of Thonburi Palace.

Since it is a historic area, it is therefore full of many ancient and historical sites, consisting of Thonburi Palace, also known as Phra Racha Wang Derm (Old Palace) in Thai, the former lodging of King Taksin next to the Wat Arun and Wichai Prasit Fort, the old fort that used to protect Bangkok, it was built since the reign of King Narai of Ayutthaya era by Greek noble who served in the Ayutthaya royal court Constantine Phaulkon.

The local prominent temples, in addition to Wat Arun and Wat Hong Rattanaram, include Wat Molilokkayaram, formerly it was known as Wat Tai Talat since it is located at the tip of the market near Thonburi Palace, as well as Wat Khruea Wan, which is the official cremation place of the Royal Thai Navy.

Opposite to Wat Molilokkayaram, it is another ancient and important Muslim house of worship Tonson Mosque. It used to be the place where Chularatchamontri (chief of Muslim in Thailand) Chaem Phromyong led King Ananda Mahidol (Rama VIII) to visit in 1946.

Royal Thai Navy Convention Center, the official convention hall of Royal Thai Navy, it was built as the venue for the APEC 2003 to hold a grand dinner for the participants and as a viewing facility for the Royal Barge Procession.

The Royal Thai Naval Institute is historic building, older than 100 years, located next to the Royal Thai Navy Convention Center. It was undergoing major renovations in 2002 along with the construction of Royal Thai Navy Convention Center.

Taweethapisek School is a high school for boys in Soi Itsaraphap 42 near Ratchadamnoen Commercial School. It was established on July 19, 1895 by King Chulalongkorn (Rama V) on a special occasion that he reigned for twice as much as his grandfather King Phutthaloetla Naphalai (Rama II).

The area is served by the Itsaraphap Station of the MRT Subway, whose Blue Line runs under the Itsaraphap Road near Wat Hong Rattanaram and historic Muslim quarters Kudi Charoenphat, Phadungtham Islam Mosque and Charoenphat Bridge.

Itsaraphap and Arun Amarin Roads considered as the main road of the area, while Wang Doem Road is a minor road.
