= Itsaraphap Road =

Street in Bangkok, Thailand

Coordinates: 13°44′57.78″N 100°28′46.16″E

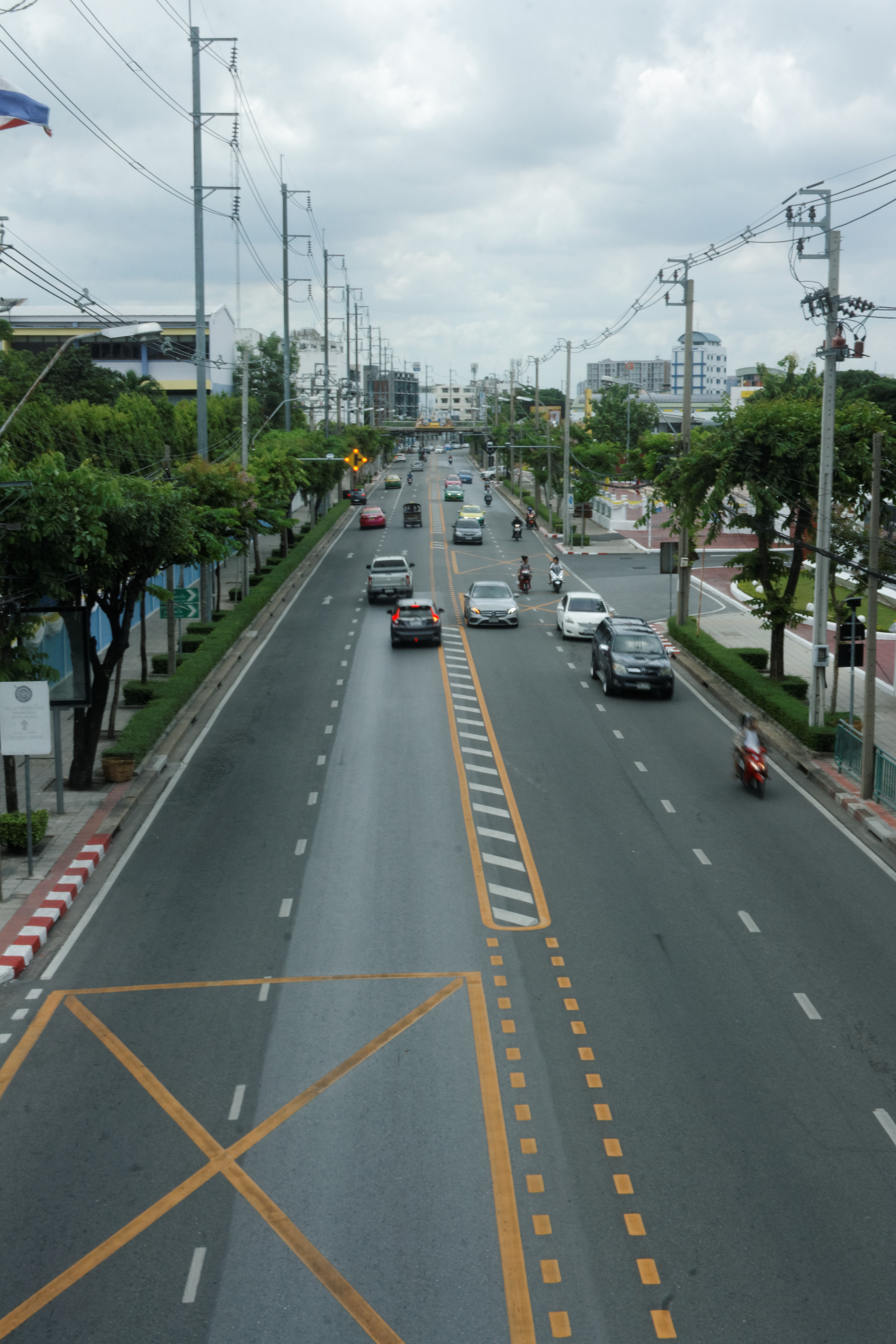
A section of Itsaraphap Road between Chinorot Wittayalai School (left) and the Royal Thai Navy Headquarters (right)

Itsaraphap Road (Thai: ถนนอิสรภาพ, pronounced [tʰā.nǒn ʔìt̚.sā.rā.pʰâːp̚]) is a main road in Bangkok's Thonburi side (west bank of Chao Phraya River). It is also the location of Itsaraphap MRT station, part of the Blue Line extension and the only underground station on the Thonburi side.

Itsaraphap Road begins at Lat Ya Junction in Khlong San Subdistrict, Khlong San District, where it meets Lat Ya and Tha Din Daeng Roads. It then runs westward, cutting across Ban Khaek Intersection where it meets Prajadhipok Road in Hiran Ruchi and Wat Kanlaya Subdistricts, Thon Buri District. The road crosses Khlong Bangkok Yai via Charoenphat Bridge into Bangkok Yai District (in this section it also serves as the boundary between Wat Arun and Wat Tha Phra Subdistricts), and continues to Pho Sam Ton Junction, where it meets Wang Doem Road. From there, it spans Khlong Mon into Ban Chang Lo Subdistrict, Bangkok Noi District, where it bends slightly north to Phran Nok Intersection, meeting Phran Nok and Wang Lang Roads (this section also serves as the boundary between Ban Chang Lo and Siri Rat Subdistricts), before terminating at Ban Noen Junction in Ban Chang Lo and Siri Rat Subdistricts, near Thonburi railway station and Siriraj Hospital (Siriraj Piyamaharajkarun Hospital). The total distance is 4.18 km (2 mi 1,051 yd).

The road was built in 1931 during the reign of King Prajadhipok (Rama VII), following the completion of Memorial Bridge linking the Phra Nakhon and Thonburi sides. It was considered one of 11 roads under the Thonburi traffic expansion project, along with Tha Din Daeng, Phran Nok, Somdet Chao Phraya, and others. The road was originally named "Chao Krung Thon Road" (ถนนเจ้ากรุงธน, lit. 'Road of the King of Thonburi') shortly after its construction. However, when the King Taksin Monument was built at the centre of Wongwian Yai, the road was renamed to honour the monarch who declared Siam's independence from Burma. The name Itsaraphap means "independence" or "freedom" in Thai.

Although short, Itsaraphap Road passes several important landmarks such as Dhonburi Rajabhat University, Bansomdejchaopraya Rajabhat University, Wat Ratchasittharam, the Royal Thai Navy Headquarters, Taweethapisek School, Thonburi Hospital, Wat Chinorot, and Chinorot Witthayalai School. It also runs past three Shia mosques, namely Kudi Charoenphat, Dilfulla Mosque, and Phadungtham Islam Mosque.
