= Wat Tha Phra subdistrict =

Coordinates: 13°43′49.4″N 100°28′25.5″E

Wat Tha Phra วัดท่าพระ
- Khwaeng
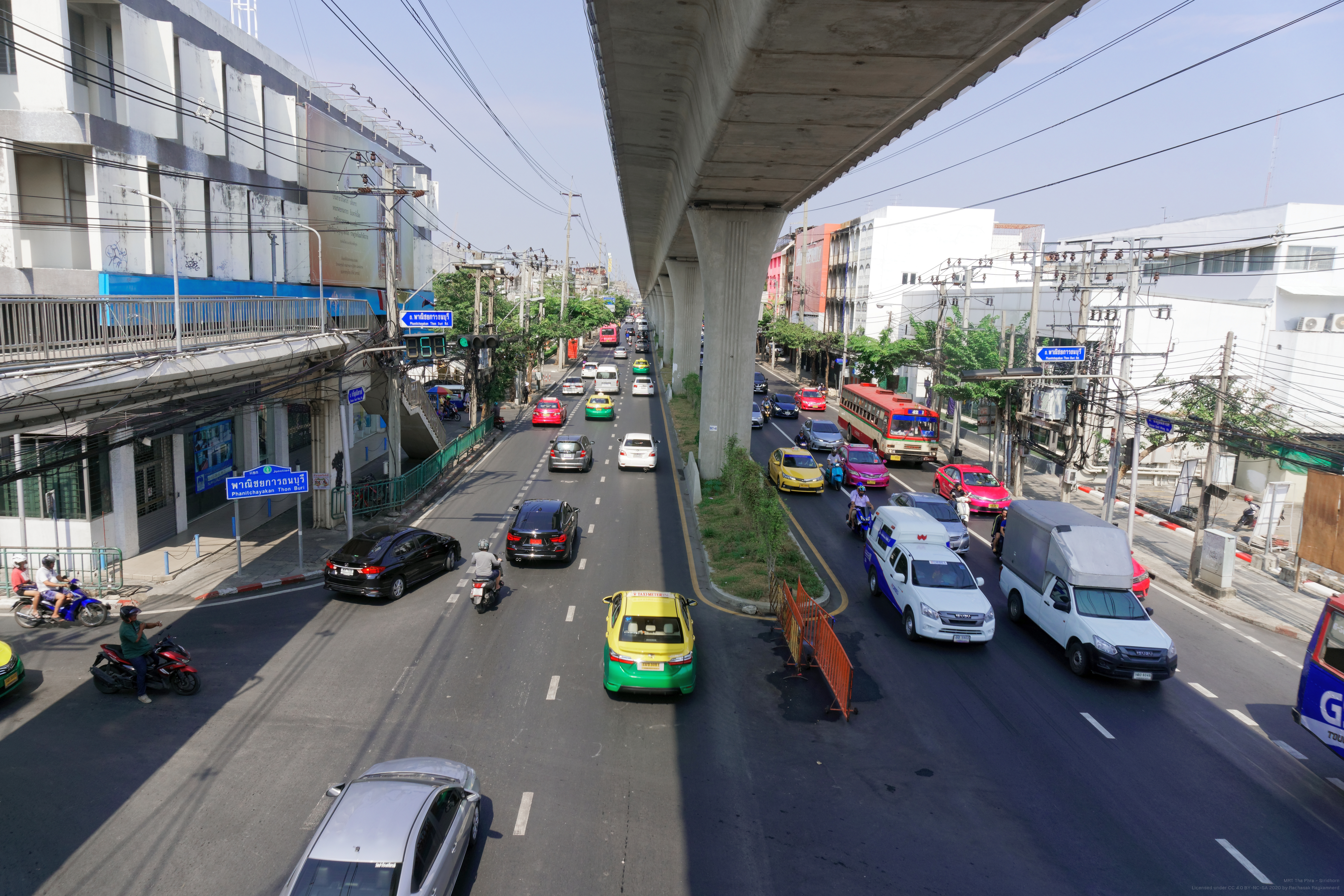
- Charan Sanit Wong Road in the area of Wat Tha Phra near Phanitchayakan Thon Buri Junction and Charan 13 MRT station (view toward Bangkok Noi)

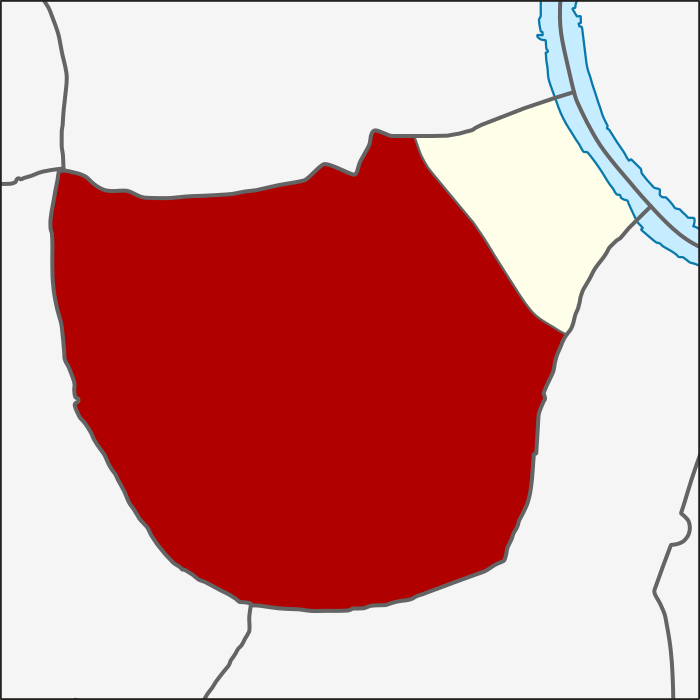
- Location in Bangkok Yai District
- Country: Thailand
- Province: Bangkok
- Khet: Bangkok Yai

Area
  - Total: 5.346 km^{2} (2.064 sq mi)

Population (2018)
  - Total: 53,111
  - Density: 9,934.71/km^{2} (25,730.8/sq mi)
- Time zone: UTC+7 (ICT)
- Postal code: 10600
- TIS 1099: 101602

Wat Tha Phra (Thai: วัดท่าพระ, pronounced [wát tʰâː pʰráʔ]) is one of the two khwaeng (subdistrict) of Bangkok Yai District, Bangkok's Thonburi side (left side of Chao Phraya River).

== History ==
Its name after a local temple, Wat Tha Phra, an ancient private temple. There is no obvious evidence of when temple was built or who built the place. It is only known that formerly the temple was called "Wat Ko" (วัดเกาะ), which means "island temple" since in those days it was surrounded by three waterways, namely Khlong Mon, Khlong Bangkok Yai, and Chao Phraya River. Later, its name was changed to "Wat Tha Phra" as today, because Luang Pho Kesorn, the sacred Buddha image of Ayutthaya period, floated along the water and reached the temple, hence the name Wat Tha Phra, which means "Buddha pier temple".

Wat Tha Phra sites on the right side of Charan Sanit Wong Road not far from Tha Phra Intersection and Tha Phra MRT station.

== Geography ==
The area is surrounded by canals on all parts except on the east part with Itsaraphap Road serves as boundary line between Wat Tha Phra and Wat Arun Subdistricts.

Neighbouring subdistricts are (from the north clockwise): Bang Khun Si and Ban Chang Lo of Bangkok Noi District (across Khlong Mon), Wat Arun in its district, Hiran Ruchi, Bang Yi Ruea and Talat Phlu of Thon Buri District (across Khlong Bangkok Yai), Pak Khlong Phasi Charoen and Khuha Sawan of Phasi Charoen District (across Khlong Bangkok Yai).

Soi Phet Kasem 4, also known as Soi Wat Sangkrachai, is a shortcut to Soi Itsaraphap 21 on Itsaraphap Road near the foot of Charoenphat Bridge and Kudi Charoenphat.

== Places ==
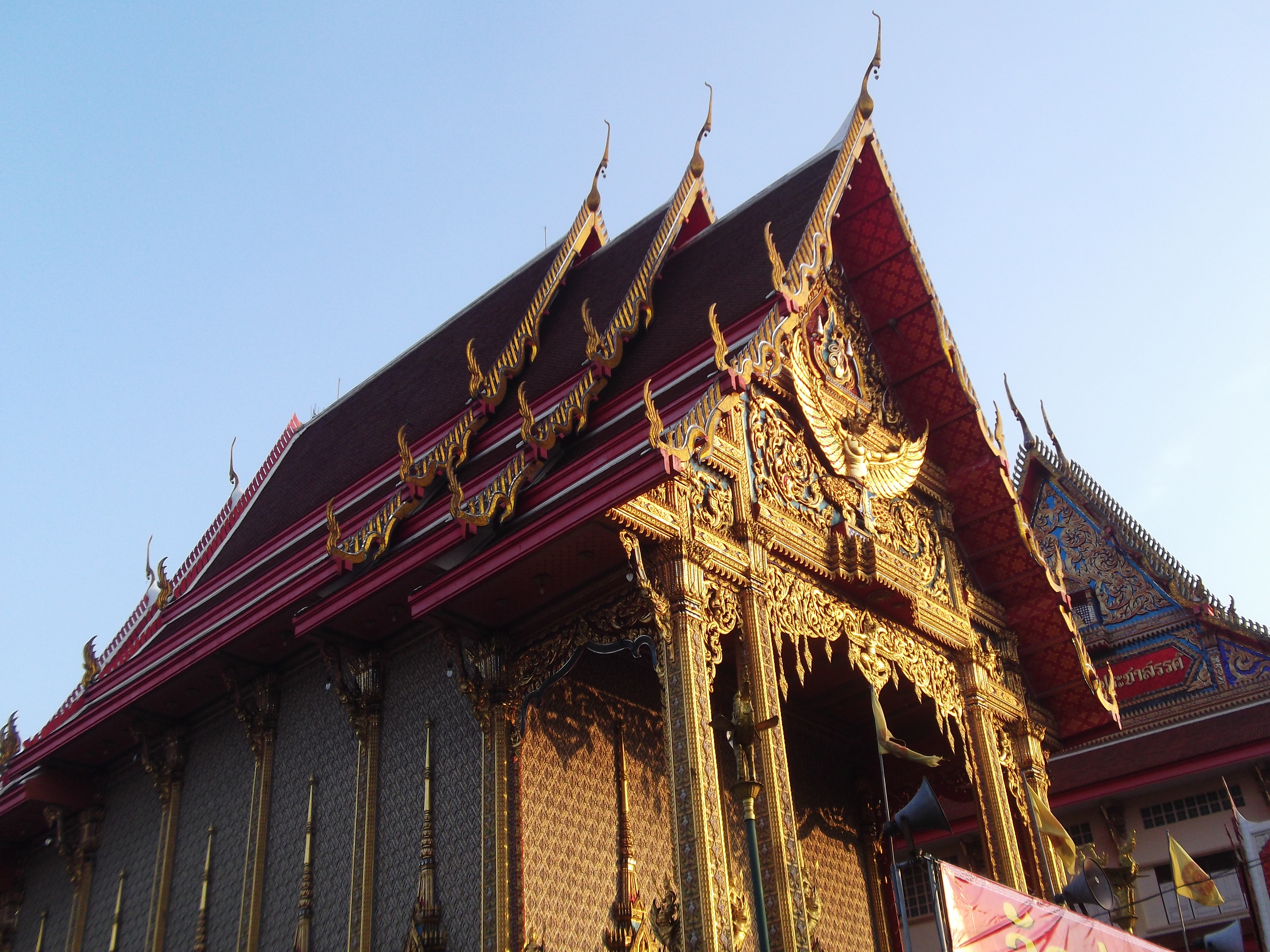
Ordination hall and gable roof of Wat Tha Phra, the origin name of subdistrict.

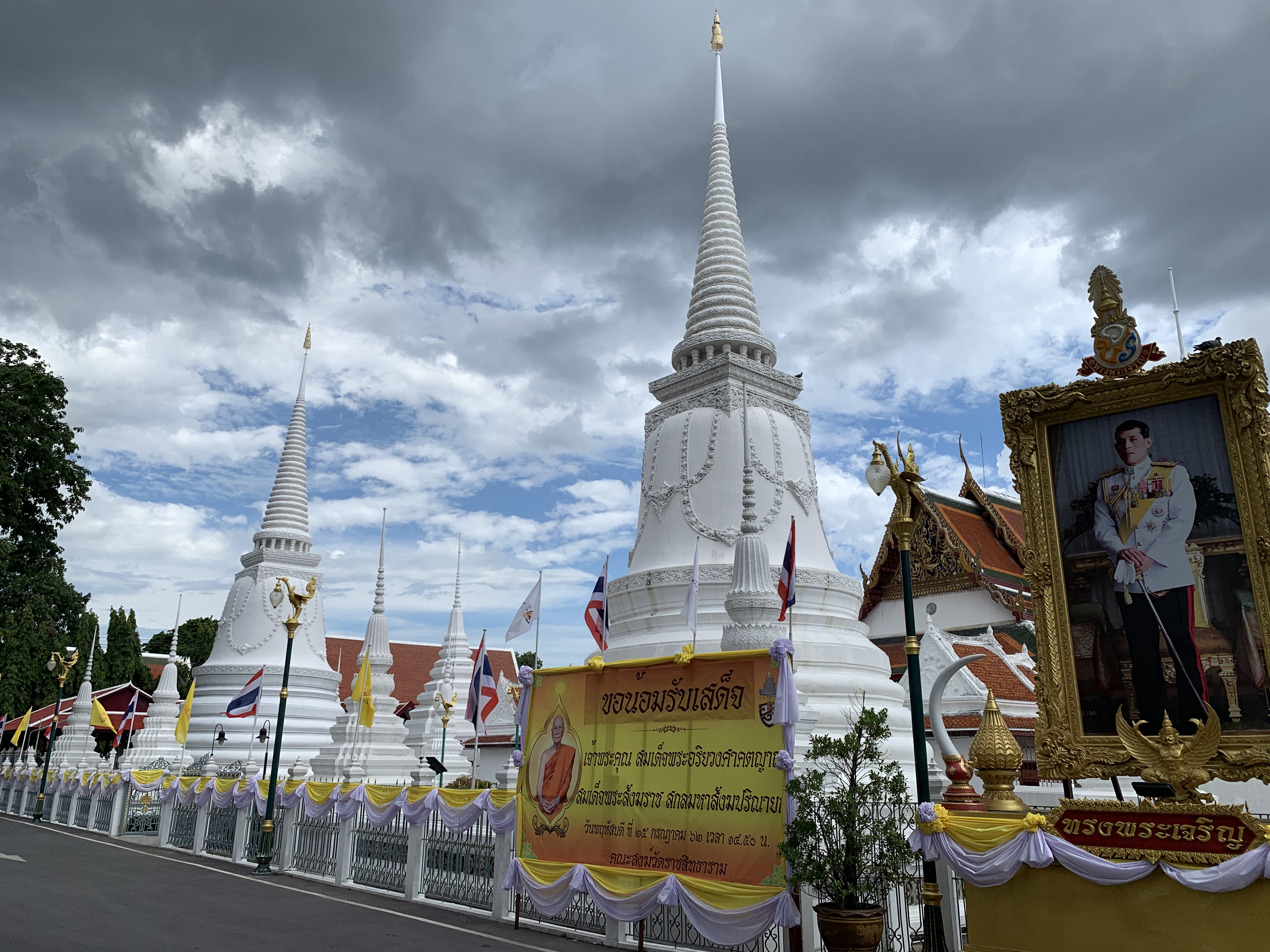
Stūpas of Wat Ratchasittharam.

=== Important places ===
- Bangkok Yai District Office
- Tha Phra MRT Station
- Tha Phra Police Station
- The Kingdom of Lesotho Consulate
- Luang Ritthinarongron House Museum
- Naowachamnian Bridge (shared with Bang Yi Ruea Subdistrict)
- Bang Phai Bridge (shared with Pak Khlong Phasi Charoen Subdistrict)
- Charoenphat Bridge (shared with Wat Arun, Wat Kanlaya and Hiran Ruchi Subdistricts)
- Charan 13 MRT station
- Itsaraphap MRT station (shared with Wat Arun Subdistrict)

=== Temples ===
- Wat Tha Phra
- Wat Diduat
- Wat Chao Mun
- Wat Pradu Chimphli
- Wat Pradu Nai Songtham
- Wat Sangkrachai
- Wat Mai Piren
- Wat Ratchasittharam
- Plai Na Mosque and Cemetery

=== Schools and colleges ===
- Wiboon Business Administration College
- Bangkok Commercial School
- Siam Technological College
- Sesawech Vidhaya School
- Ritthinarongron School
- Saiprasit Business Administration Technological
- Saiprasit School
- Prasart Wittaya Anuchon School
- Wat Pradu Chimphli School

=== Transportation ===
- Phet Kasem Road (Highway 4)
- Charan Sanit Wong Road
- Ratchadapisek Road
- Itsaraphap Road
