= Tha Phra =

Coordinates: 13°43′45.93″N 100°28′29.99″E

Tha Phra intersection
- แยกท่าพระ
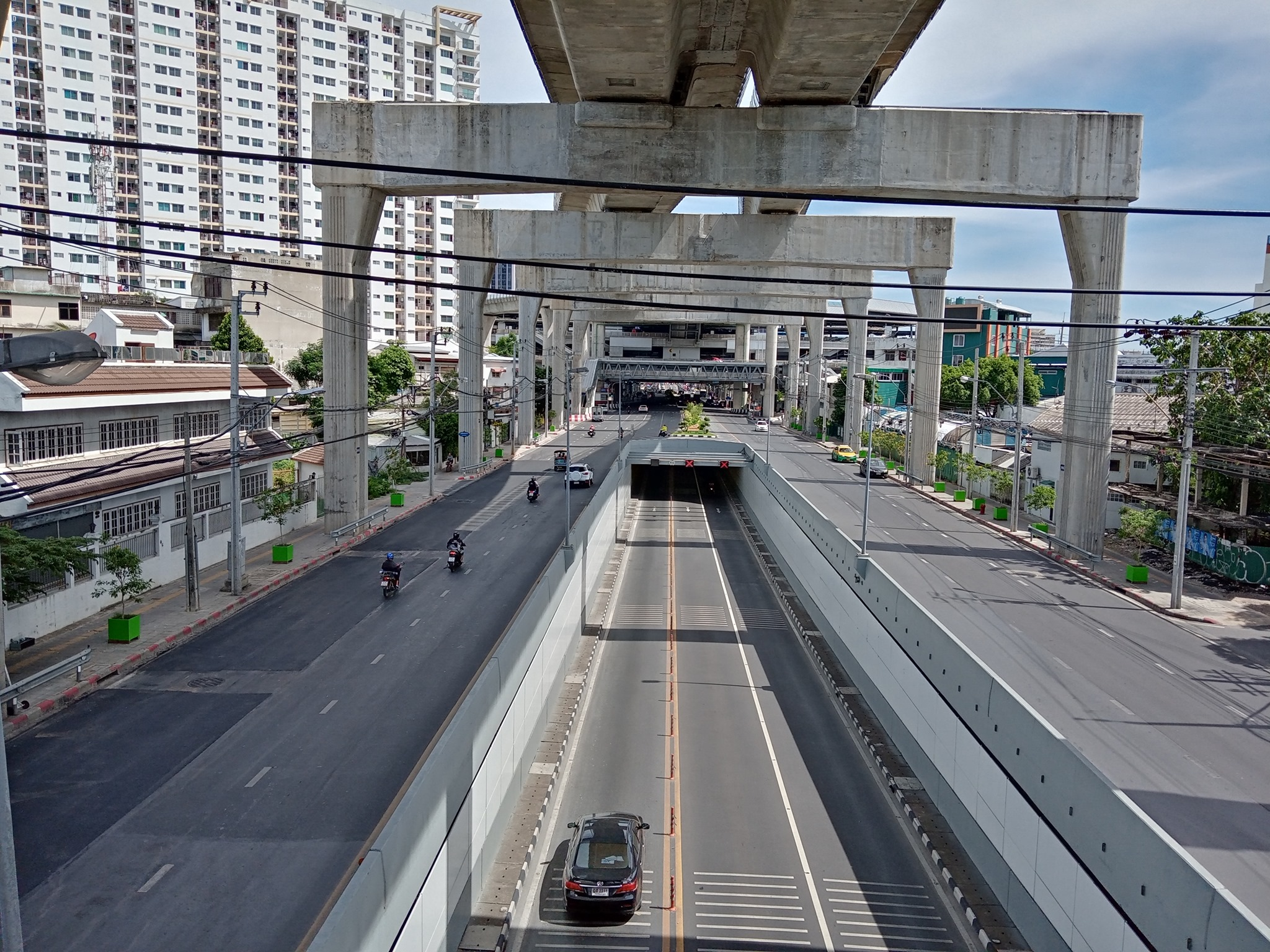
- Tha Phra Intersection in 2020 (photo taken over Ratchadaphisek road) with Tha Phra MRT station visible
- Interactive map of Tha Phra intersection

Location
- Wat Tha Phra subdistrict, Bangkok Yai district, Bangkok
- Roads at junction: Charan Sanit Wong (north); Ratchadaphisek (south); Phet Kasem (east–west)

Construction
- Type: Four-way at-grade intersection with bidirectional flyover and tunnel

Tha Phra (Thai: ท่าพระ, pronounced [tʰâː pʰráʔ]) is a main road intersection in Wat Tha Phra subdistrict, Bangkok Yai district, Bangkok. The roads that intersect here are Ratchadaphisek (Inner Ring Road), Charan Sanit Wong Road, and Phet Kasem Road (Highway 4). It is one of the most important intersection in the Thon Buri side of Bangkok. (West bank of Chao Phraya River)

== Characteristics & history ==
Tha Phra Intersection is where Ratchadaphisek Road (Inner Ring Road) meets Charan Sanit Wong Road, and also marks the first major junction of Phet Kasem Road (Highway 4), which is the longest road in Thailand and the main highway to the southern provinces.

The area features an overpass crossing Phet Kasem Road and an underpass connecting Ratchadaphisek and Charan Sanit Wong Roads. It is considered one of the most congested intersections on the Thonburi side, west of the Chao Phraya river.

The name "Tha Phra" comes from Wat Tha Phra (วัดท่าพระ), a temple located near the intersection on the inbound side of Charan Sanit Wong Road.

Tha Phra Intersection is also the location of Tha Phra MRT Station on the MRT Blue Line, which serves as an self-interchange between the Bang Sue–Tha Phra and the Hua Lamphong–Lak Song segments of the line.

Before Phet Kasem Road was constructed in the 1950s, Tha Phra and its surrounding areas were filled with canals and fruit orchards. The most notable fruit grown in the area was the Burmese grape (ma-fai).

Originally a three-way junction between Phet Kasem and Charan Sanit Wong Roads, the area was transformed into a four-way intersection following the expansion of Ratchadaphisek Road in 1983. The overpass was completed and opened in 1991.

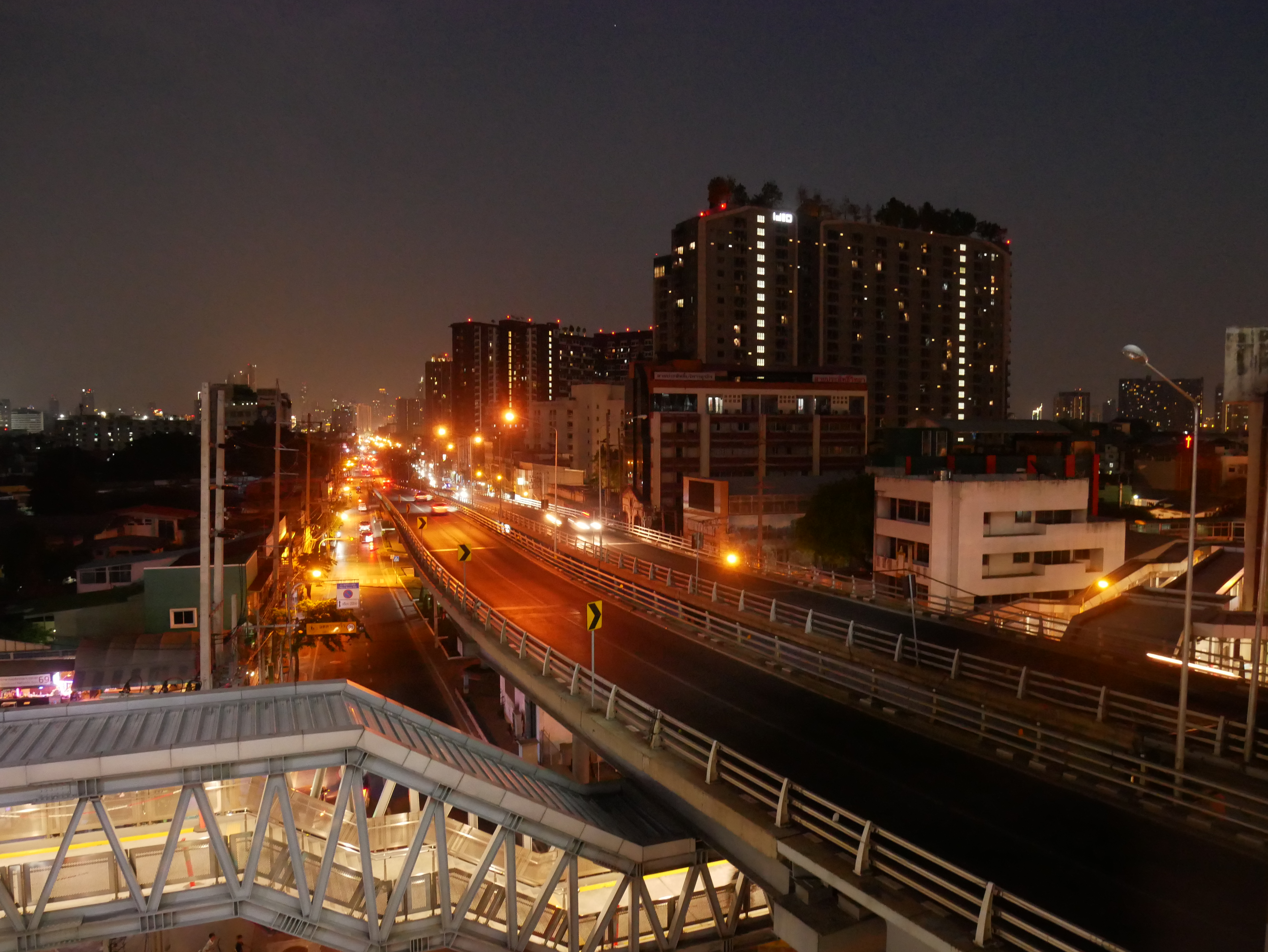
An overpass at Tha Phra Intersection at night in 2024 (looking east along Phet Kasem Road)

== Surroundings ==
- Phet Kasem (east side)
  - Saiprasit Wittaya School
  - Saiprasit Business Administration Technological College
  - Naowa Chamnian Bridge
  - Tha Phra Rungruang Market
- Phet Kasem (west side)
  - Tha Phra Market
  - Wat Pradu Chimphli
  - Wat Pradu Chimphli School
  - Wat Pradu Nai Songtham
  - Wat Pradu Nai Songtham School
  - Wat Nuannoradit
  - Wat Nuannoradit School
  - Bang Phai Bridge
  - Bangkokthonburi Vocational College (formerly Weeboonseree Wittaya School)
  - Krungthep Business Vocational College
- Charan Sanit Wong side
  - Wat Tha Phra
  - Tha Phra Police Station
  - Wat Chao Mun
  - Wat Chao Mun School
  - Siam Technological College
  - Sesawech Vidhaya School (closed)
- Ratchadapisek side
  - Prasart Wittaya Anuchon School
  - Bangkok Yai District Office
  - Talat Phlu BTS station
  - Talat Phlu
  - Ratchada-Tha Phra Hospital
  - The Mall Lifestore Tha Phra

== Transportation ==
- MRT Subway: Tha Phra MRT station
- BMTA and affiliated's buses routes: 4-36 (7), 4-48 (7ก), 4-10 (42), 4-41 (57), 4-12 (68), 4-43 (80), 4-46 (84), 4-47 (89), 4-60 (91), 91ก, 4-19 (108), 4-52 (146), 4-25 (147), 4-54E (157), 2-22 (175), 4-60 (509), 4-63 (547)
