= Charoenphat Bridge =

Bridge in Bangkok, Thailand

Coordinates: 13°44′10.12″N 100°29′16.11″E

Charoenphat Bridge สะพานเจริญพาศน์
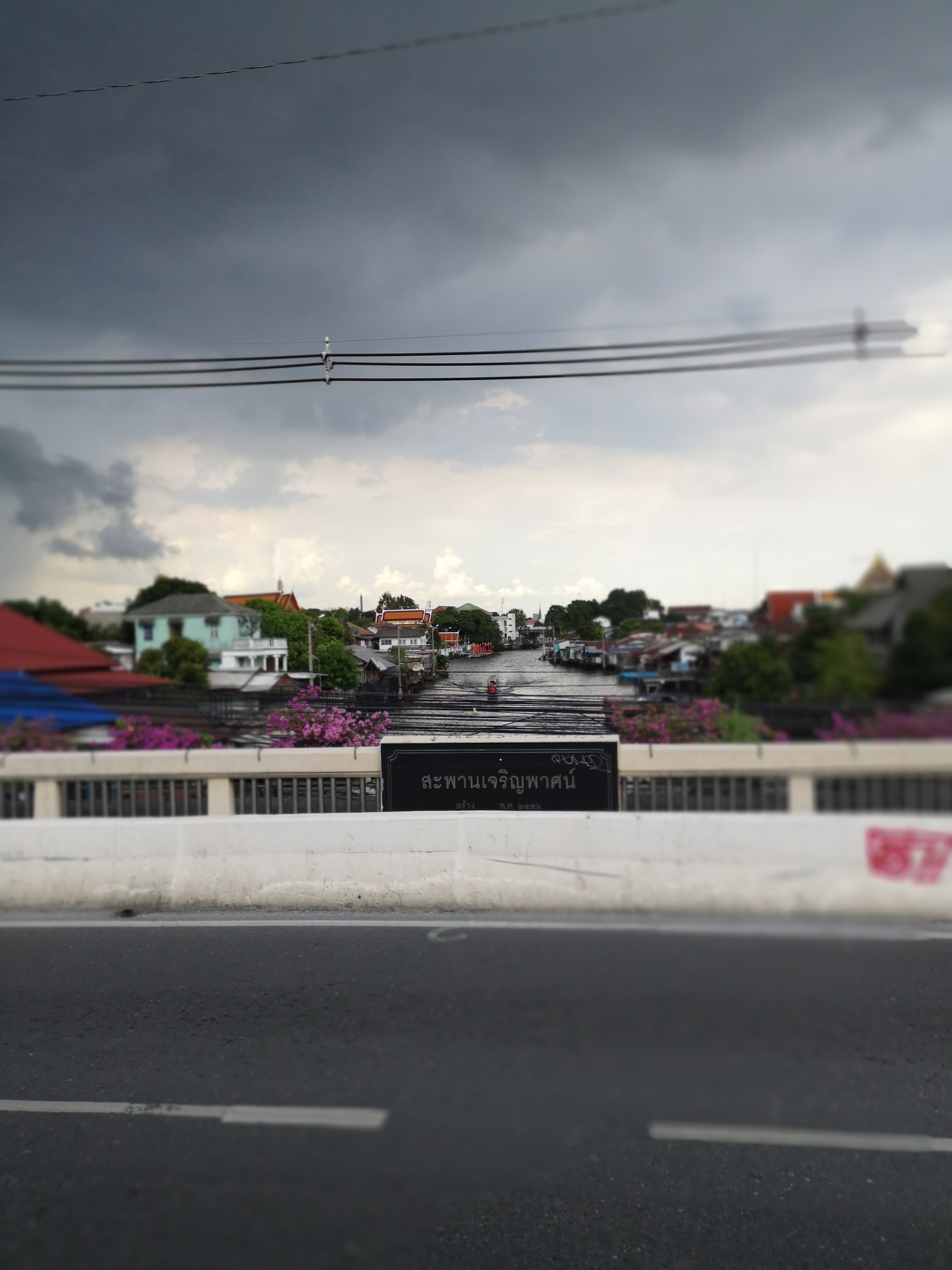
- Charoenphat Bridge in 2018
- Carries: Itsaraphap Road
- Crosses: Khlong Bangkok Yai
- Locale: Thon Buri and Bangkok Yai districts, Bangkok, Thailand
- Official name: Charoenphat Bridge
- Other name(s): Charoenphat 33 Bridge
- Maintained by: Bangkok Metropolitan Administration (BMA)
- Preceded by: Anutin Sawat Bridge
- Followed by: Naowa Chamnian Bridge

History
- Opened: December 29, 1913

Charoenphat Bridge (Note: It is a more commonly used name than Charoenphat 33 Bridge.) (Thai: สะพานเจริญพาศน์, RTGS: Saphan Charoen Phat, pronounced [sa.pʰaːn t͡ɕa.rɤːn pʰaːt]), or formerly known as Charoenphat 33 Bridge is a historic bridge in Bangkok, Thailand.

It is the only bridge in the Charoen series located on the Thonburi side, the left bank of the Chao Phraya river in Bangkok. The bridge, crossing Khlong Bangkok Yai, is unique in that its two ends serve as connecting points between four subdistricts in two districts. On the southeast side, it reaches Thon Buri district, linking Hiran Ruchi and Wat Kanlaya; on the northwest side, it connects to Bangkok Yai district, through Wat Tha Phra and Wat Arun subdistricts. So the surrounding area also came to be known as "Charoenphat" in turn.

Charoenphat is the third bridge in the Charoen series. It was opened in 1913 on the occasion of King Vajiravudh (Rama VI)'s 33rd birthday. Before it, there was Charoen Rat 32 Bridge in the Bobae area, followed by Charoen Sri 34 Bridge on Rattanakosin Island.

The King personally presided over the bridge's inauguration on December 29, 1913. The bridge's original sculptures were far more exquisite than what remains today. At the centre of the bridge, above the nameplate, there was a sculpture of a five-headed nāga, reflecting that His Majesty was born in the Year of the Dragon. The bridge also bore His Royal Cypher, Vor Por Ror (ว.ป.ร.)

The bridge has undergone numerous renovations, so that its original appearance no longer remains. Even the name has been shortened, removing the Thai number "๓๓" and leaving only "Charoenphat Bridge" as it appears today.

At the Bangkok Yai end of the bridge stands an ancient mosque, Masjid Husayniyya, also better known as Kudi Charoenphat, a Shia Muslim mosque commonly known among Thais as Khaek Chao Sen. Its founders were Persian ancestors. Diagonally across from it, at the entrance of Soi Itsaraphap 19/1, there is also a World War II-era bomb shelter. Today, it exists only as a small room that is kept locked.

In addition, close by Soi Itsaraphap 21, also known as Soi Wat Sangkrachai, there is a shortcut leading out to Phetkasem Road (Highway 4) via Soi Phetkasem 4, the longest highway in Thailand.
