= Wat Pradu Chimphli =

Buddhist temple in Thailand

Coordinates: 13°43′27″N 100°28′12″E

- วัดประดู่ฉิมพลี
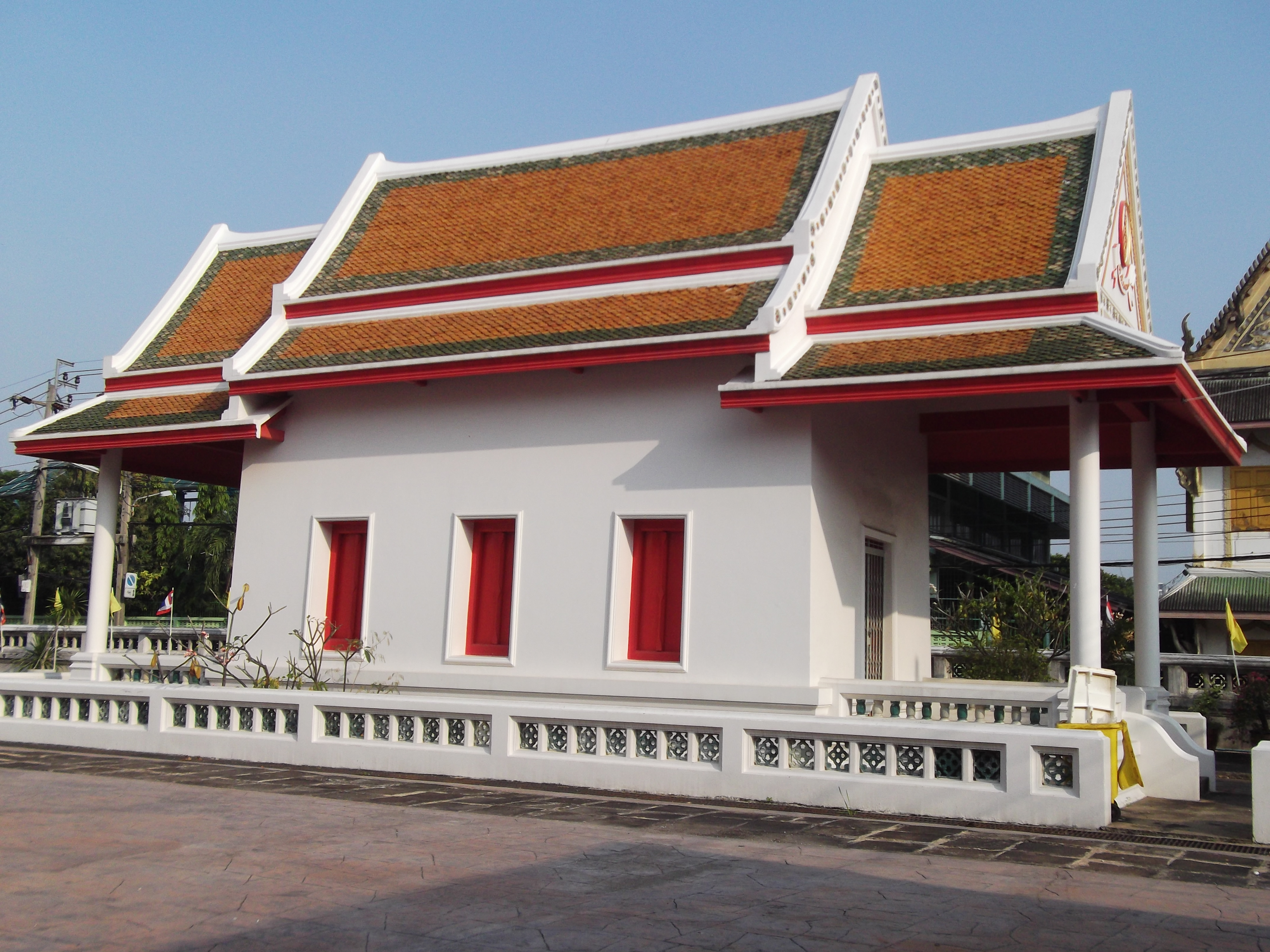
- Beside of ordination hall

- Location within Thailand

Religion
- Affiliation: Buddhism
- Sect: Theravāda, Mahānikāya
- Province: Bangkok
- Region: Thonburi side

Location
- Location: 1162 Soi Phet Kasem 15, Phet Kasem Rd, Wat Tha Phra, Bangkok Yai
- Country: Thailand
- Interactive map of Wat Pradu Chimphli

Architecture
- Founder: King Nangklao (Rama III)

Wat Pradu Chimphli (Thai: วัดประดู่ฉิมพลี; also spelled: Wat Pradu Chimplee or Wat Pradoochimplee) is an ancient civilian Thai Buddhist temple in Wat Tha Phra Subdistrict, Bangkok Yai District, Bangkok's Thonburi side. The temple is situated rim Khlong Bangkok Yai, where is confluence of khlongs (canal) Phasi Charoen, and Bangkok Yai.

The temple dates back to the reign of King Nangklao (Rama III) during early Rattanakosin period. It has the original name called "Wat Chimphli", derives from the many cotton trees (Bombax ceiba) that were found throughout this area (chimphli is cotton tree in Thai). But popular people called "Wat Pradu Nai" (วัดประดู่ใน; lit: inner Wat Pradu) in pair with nearby temple, Wat Pranu Nok (วัดประดู่นอก; outer Wat Pradu) or Wat Pradu Nai Songtham in present day.

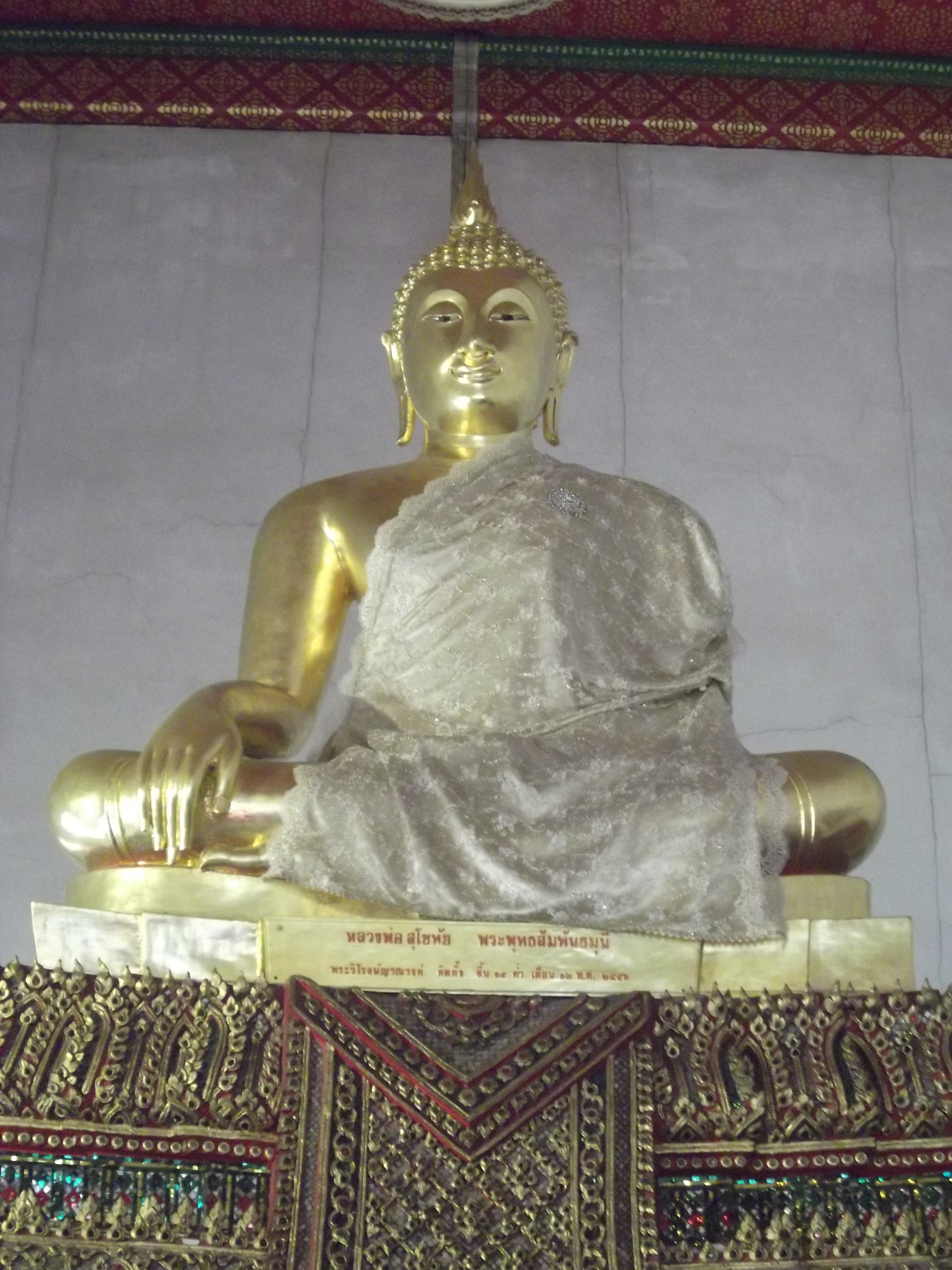
Principal Buddha image

This temple was completed in the early reign of King Mongkut (Rama IV) by Phrasi Pipat Rachakosa (Tat Bunnag) as a project director, it took eight years to build. When completed it was said that it was the most beautiful civilian temple at that time, especially the ordination hall, and principal Sukhothai Buddha image in Māravijaya attitude named "Luang Pho Sukothai Phraphuttha Samphanthamunee", with pagoda in the Mon style etc.

Wat Pradu Chimphli is famous for Luang Pu Toh was the abbot during 1910s–1980s. He developed the temple in many ways and was a dedicated and merciful monk and highly respected by the local devotees including King Bhumibol Adulyadej (Rama IX). He was also famous for being the creator of Buddha amulets that called "Phra Pid Ta" (พระปิดตา; "eyes closed Buddha"). It is claimed to gives its owner great luck and protection and there is a saying that whoever owns a Luang Pu Toh amulet will be free from poverty.
