= Itsaraphap MRT station =

Subway station in Bangkok, Thailand

Coordinates: 13°44′18.3″N 100°29′07.1″E

อิสรภาพ Itsaraphap
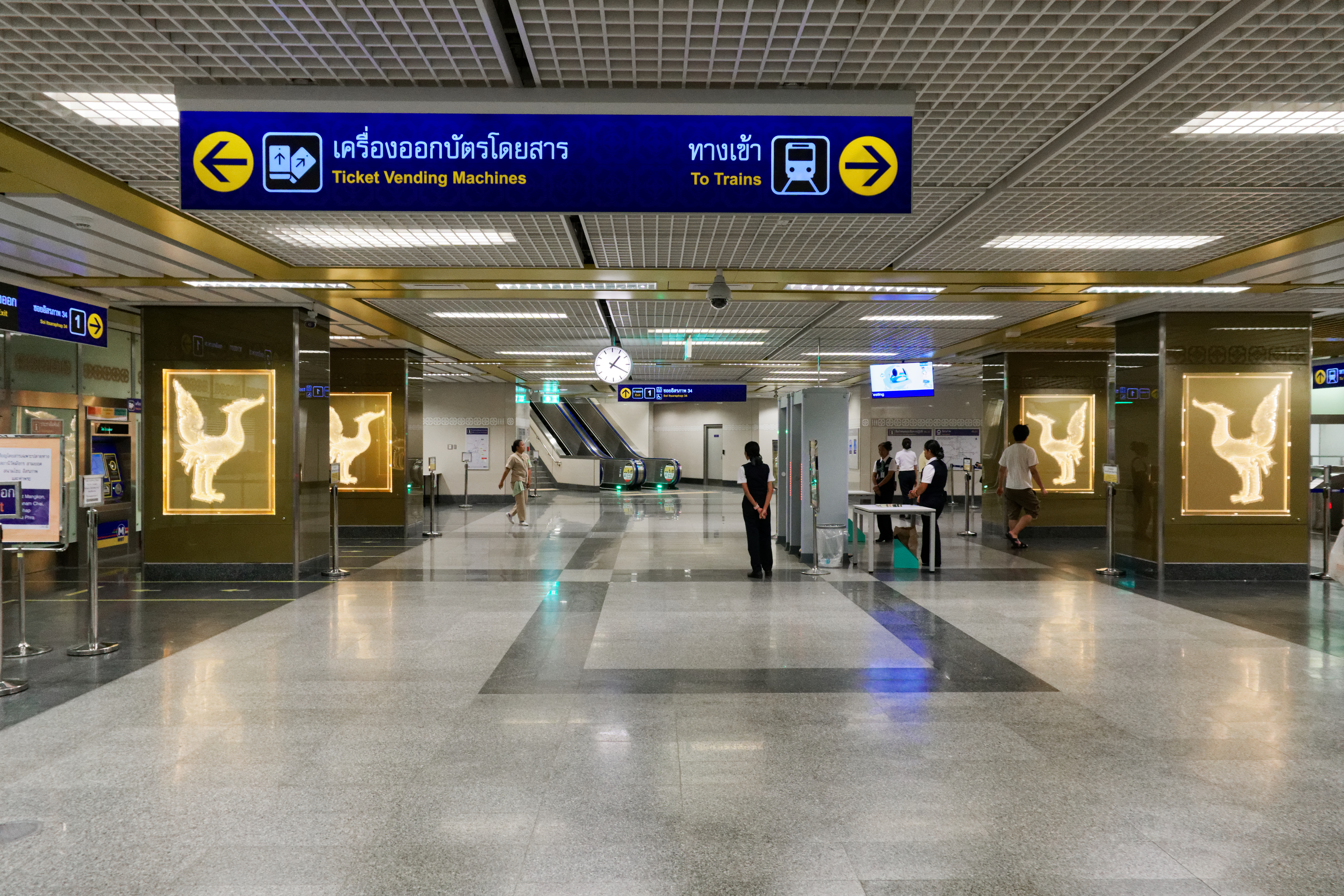
- Ticket office and the pillars decorated with four glowing swan motifs

General information
- Location: Wat Tha Phra and Wat Arun Subdistricts, Bangkok Yai District, Bangkok, Thailand
- System: MRT
- Owner: Mass Rapid Transit Authority of Thailand (MRTA)
- Operator: Bangkok Expressway and Metro Public Company Limited (BEM)
- Line: MRT MRT Blue Line
- Platforms: 1 island platform (2 exits, 2 elevators)

Construction
- Structure type: Underground

Other information
- Station code: BL32

History
- Opened: 29 July 2019; 7 years ago

Passengers
- 2021: 1,502,553

Services
Preceding station	Metropolitan Rapid Transit	Following station
Tha Phra towards Lak Song	Blue Line	Sanam Chai towards Tha Phra via Bang Sue
Location

Itsaraphap station (Thai: สถานีอิสรภาพ, pronounced [sā.tʰǎː.nīː ʔìt.sā.rā.pʰâːp]) is a Bangkok MRT rapid transit station on the Blue Line.

Itsaraphap station is the first and only underground station in the Thonburi side and is the last underground before elevating above ground to the Tha Phra station. The station is bridged to Sanam Chai station through a tunnel running below the Chao Phraya River, with distance from the water surface to the tunnel approx. 30 m (98 ft) in depth, traversing horizontally under the Itsaraphap Road from Soi Itsaraphap 23 to Soi Itsaraphap 34.

The design of this station is based on the swan, a mythical creature which represents good fortune, and is also the symbol of Wat Hong Rattanaram, a temple with a very long history, built since the Ayutthaya era, in order to convey the history of the neighbouring areas, such as Wat Ratchasittharam, Wat Arun Ratchawararam (temple of dawn), Wat Hong Rattanaram, Thonburi Palace etc.

From this station, passengers can travel to various important places nearby, such as Dhonburi Rajabhat University, Bansomdej Chaopraya Rajabhat University, Kudi Chin Community, Taweethapisek School, Thonburi Hospital, Siriraj Hospital, Thonburi Railway Station, and the Iconsiam with bus, songthaew (a type of tuk-tuk) or motorbike taxi.

Itsaraphap Station Traditional sign

== Station layout ==
G Ground floor	-	Bus stop
B1; Basement	Basement	Exits 1–2
B2; Concourse	Concourse	Ticket machines
B4; Platform	Platform 2	Blue towards Tha Phra via Bang Sue (Sanam Chai)
B4; Platform	Island platform, doors will open on the right
B4; Platform	Platform 1	Blue towards Lak Song (Tha Phra)

== Gallery ==
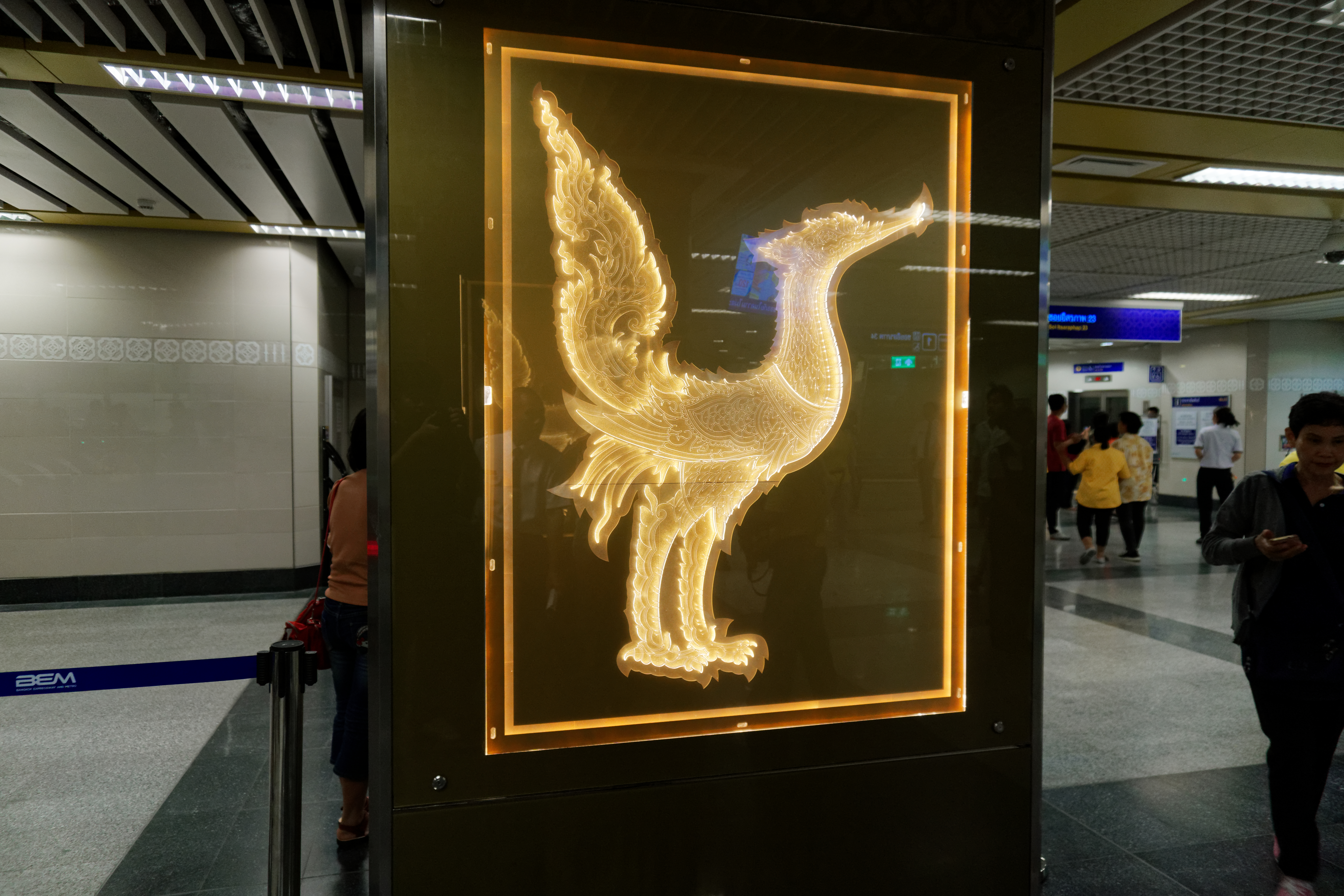

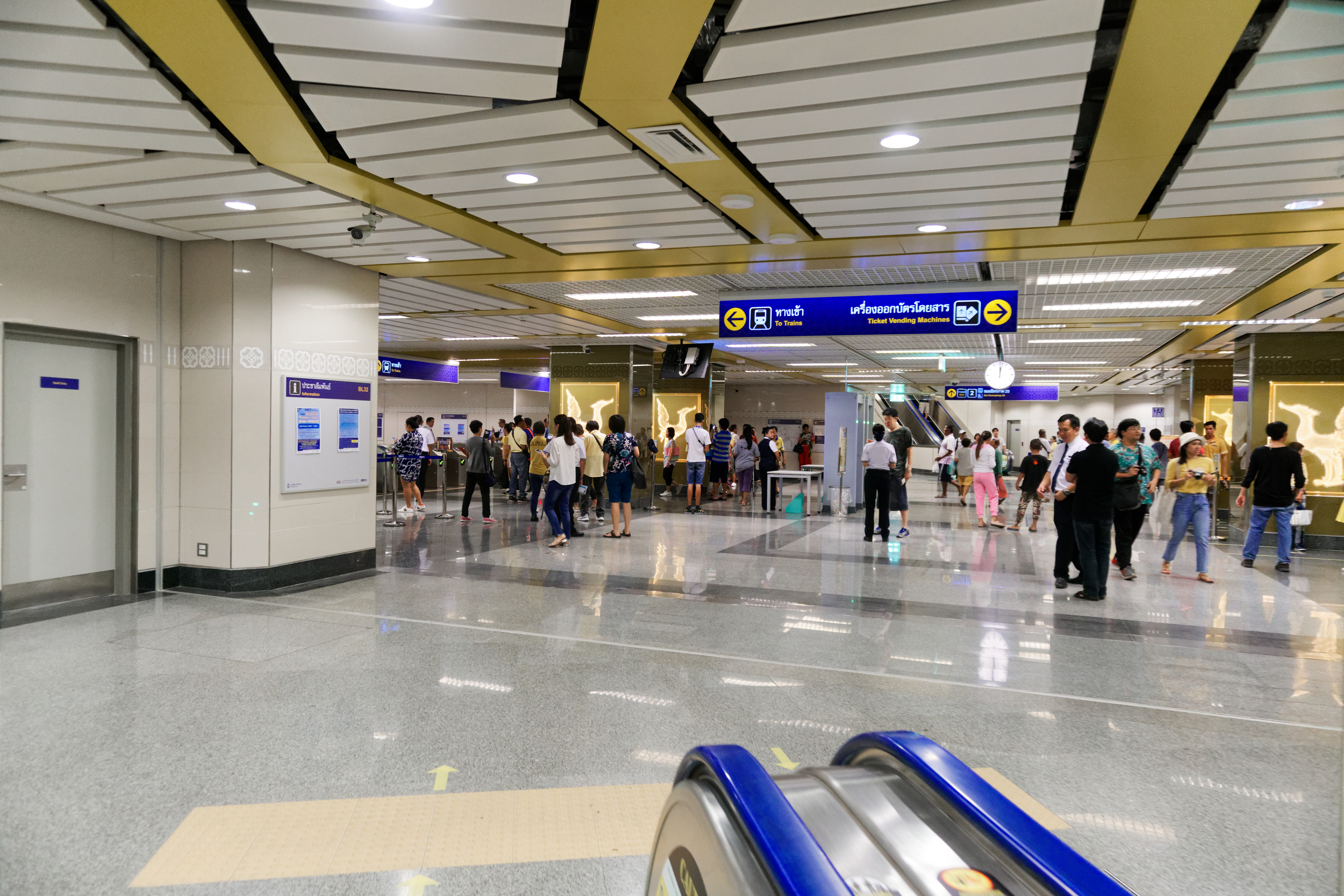

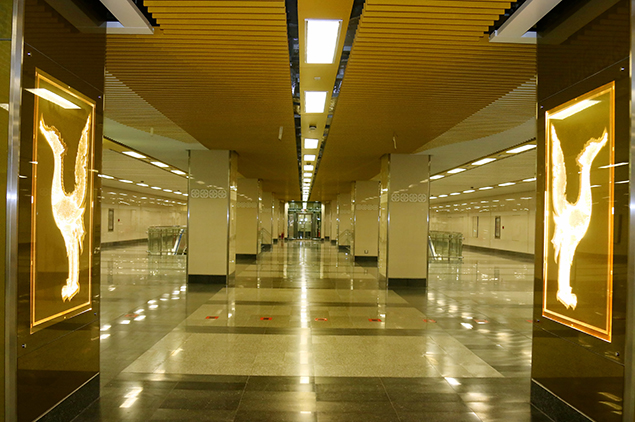

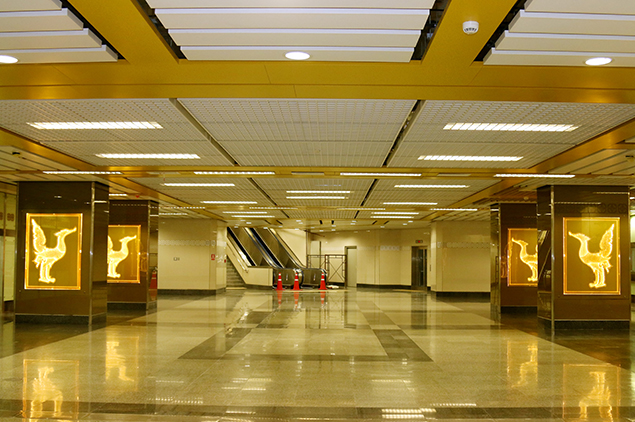

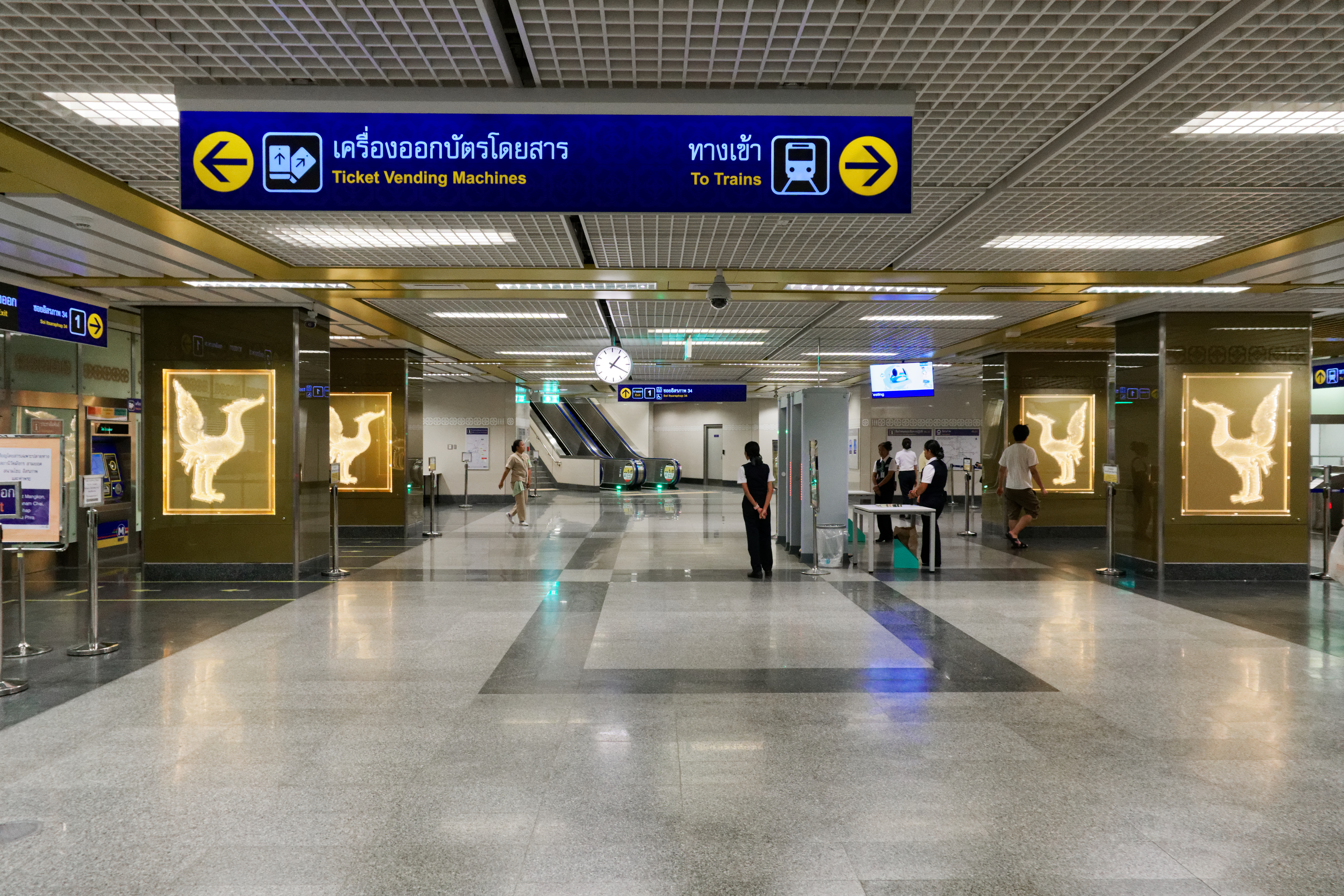
