= Tha Phra MRT station =

Metro station in Bangkok, Thailand

ท่าพระ BL01 Tha Phra
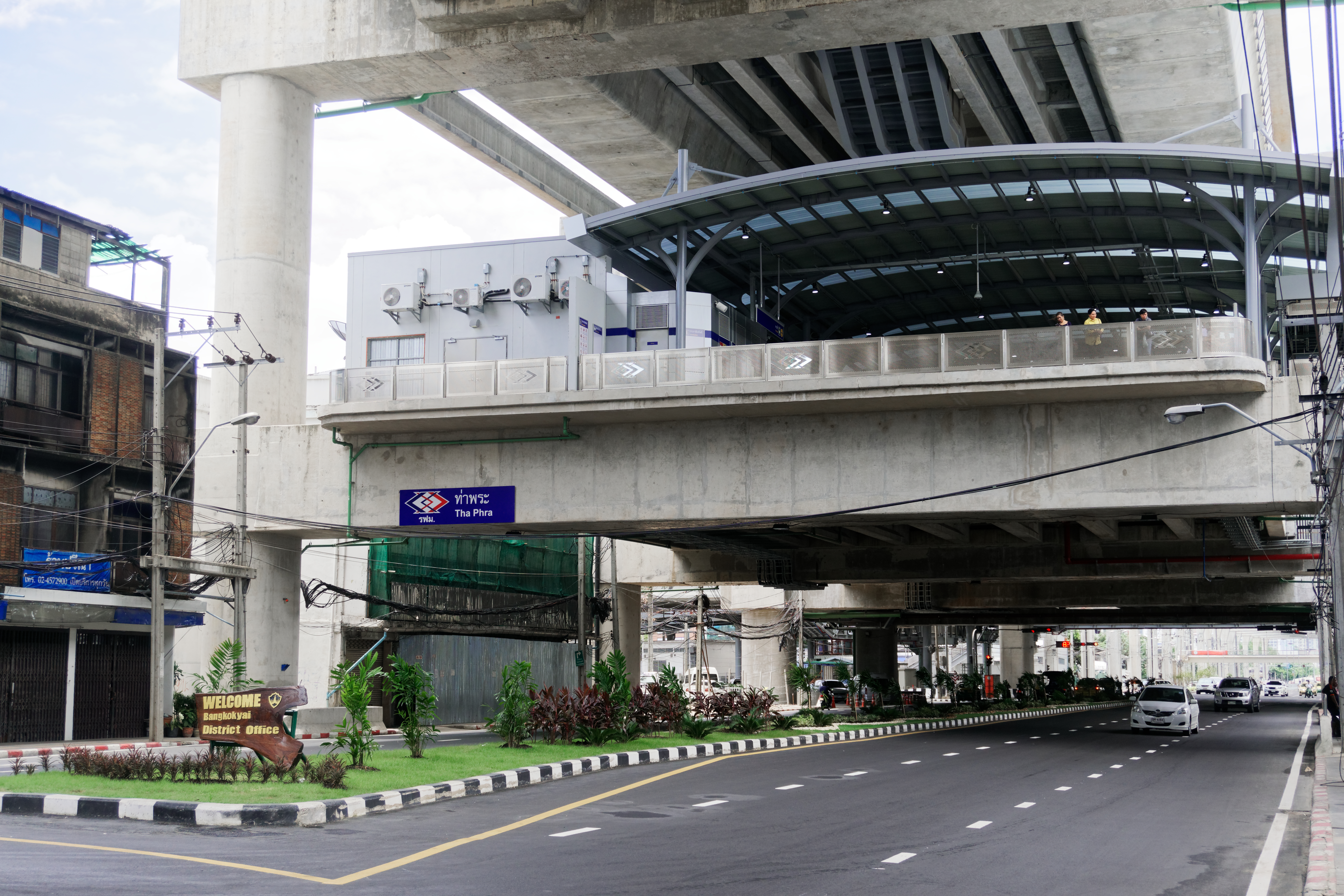
- Tha Phra MRT station, seen from Charan Sanit Wong Road

General information
- Location: Bangkok Yai, Bangkok, Thailand
- Coordinates: 13.72938°N 100.47421°E
- System: MRT
- Owner: Mass Rapid Transit Authority of Thailand (MRTA)
- Operator: Bangkok Expressway and Metro Public Company Limited (BEM)
- Line: MRT MRT Blue Line
- Platforms: 2 side platforms 1 island platform
- Tracks: 4

Construction
- Structure type: Elevated

Other information
- Station code: BL01

History
- Opened: 29 July 2019; 7 years ago (lower platform); 23 December 2019; 6 years ago (upper platform)

Passengers
- 2021: 1,629,852

Services
Preceding station	Metropolitan Rapid Transit	Following station
Bang Phai towards Lak Song	Blue Line lower platform	Itsaraphap towards Tha Phra via Bang Sue
Charan 13 towards Lak Song	Blue Line upper platform	Terminus
Location

Tha Phra station (Thai: สถานีท่าพระ, pronounced [sā.tʰǎː.nīː tʰâː pʰráʔ]) is an MRT Blue Line station, located at Tha Phra Intersection, Bangkok Yai District, Bangkok, Thailand. It is the self-interchange station of MRT Blue Line and a terminal station.

The station was opened in two stages. First stage was opened on 29 July 2019, consisting of a concourse and lower platform for the Hua Lamphong - Lak Song extension. The upper platform was opened on 23 December 2019.

== Station layout ==
Tha Phra Station is an elevated self-interchange station. The station has side platforms on the lower floor and island platform on the upper floor.

=== Floor ===
- U3 Upper Platform
- U2 Lower Platform
- U1 Ticket hall and station concourse
- Street level Station entrance

== Services ==
=== Upper Platform ===
Platform 3, 4 for service to Charan 13 and Lak Song (via Bang Sue)

=== Lower Platform ===
Platform 1 for service to Lak Song

Platform 2 for service to Itsaraphap and Tha Phra (via Bang Sue)

== Gallery ==
Tha Phra Station Traditional sign

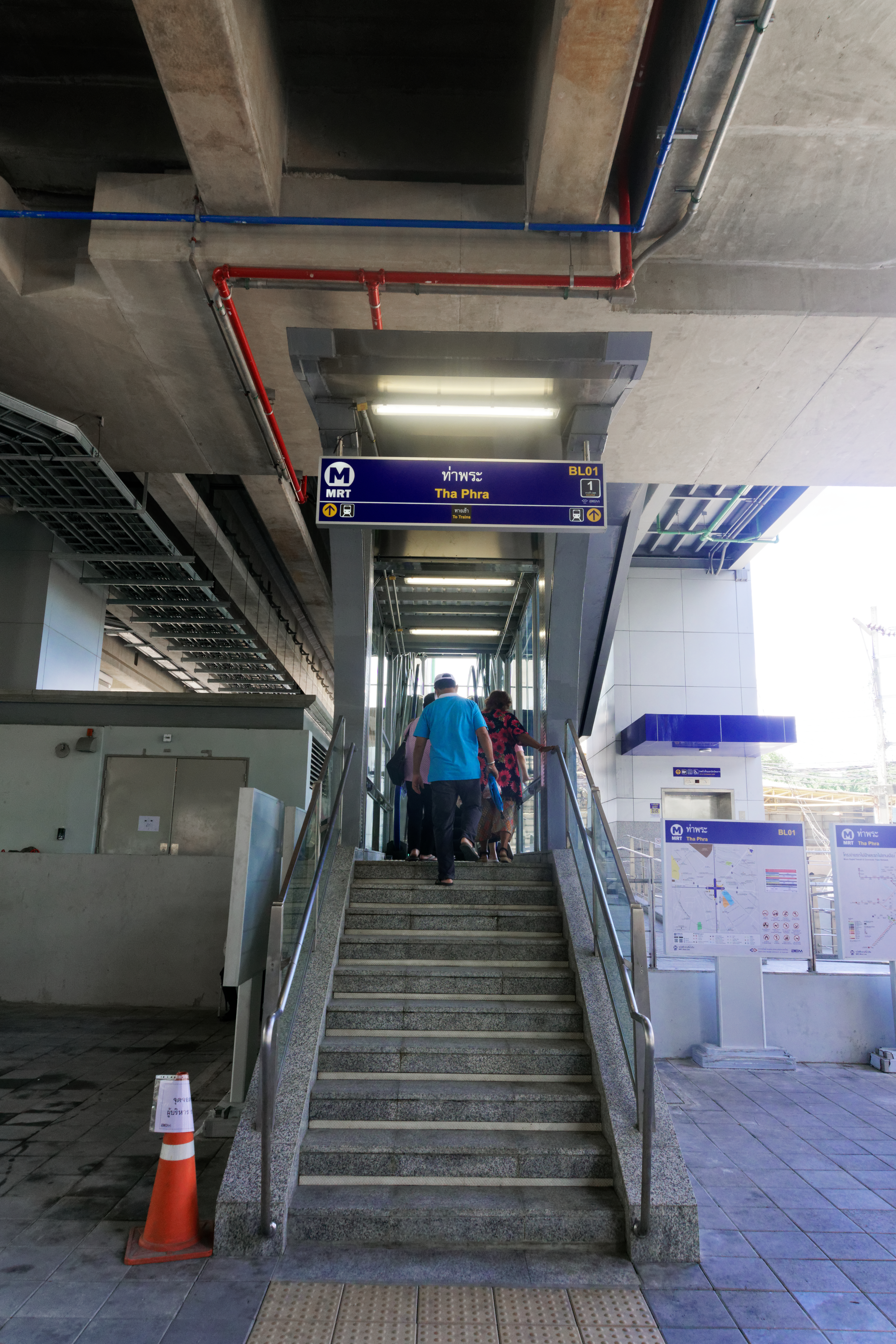
Tha Phra station: Entrance 1

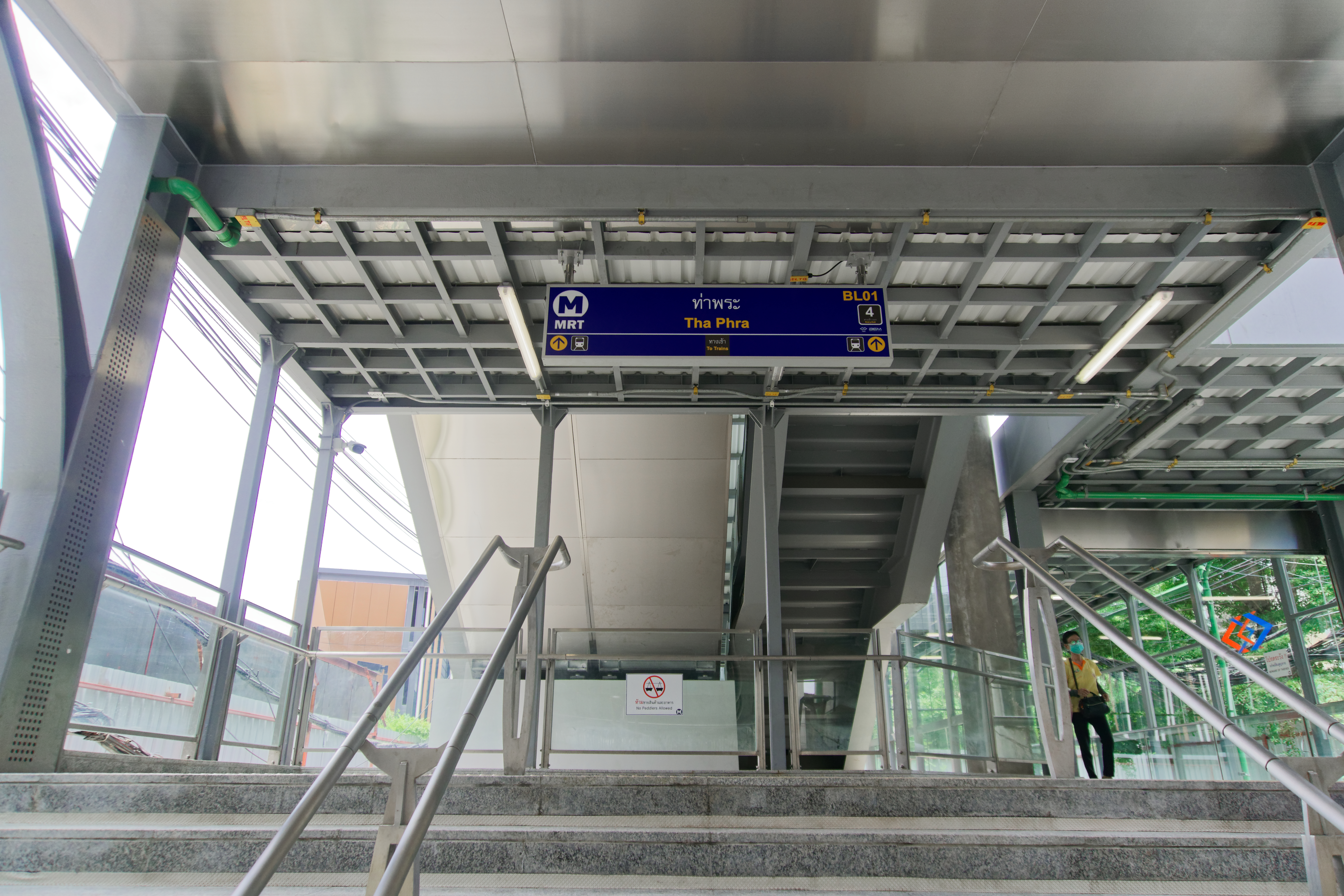
Tha Phra station: Entrance 4

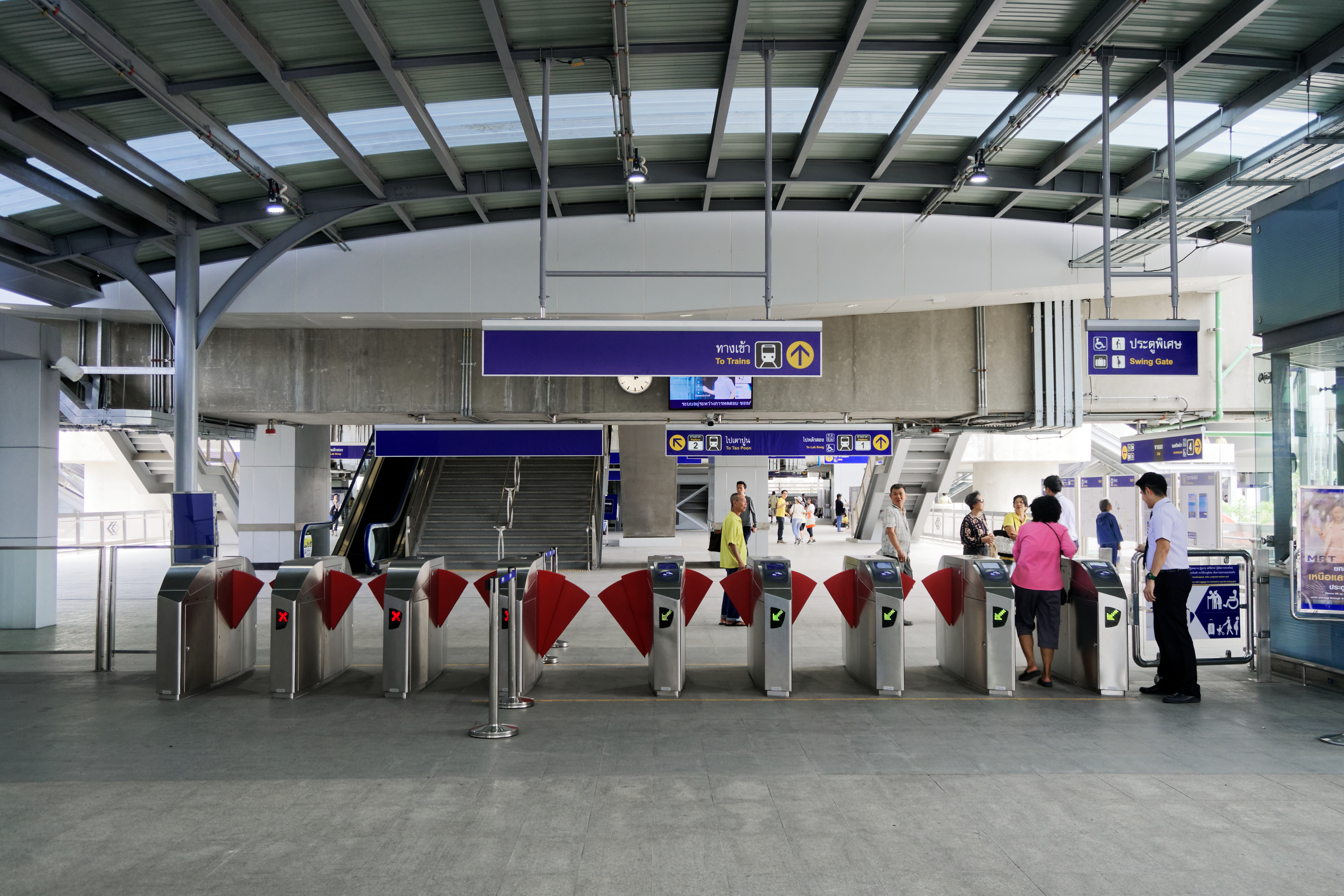
Faregate on Charansanitwong rd. side

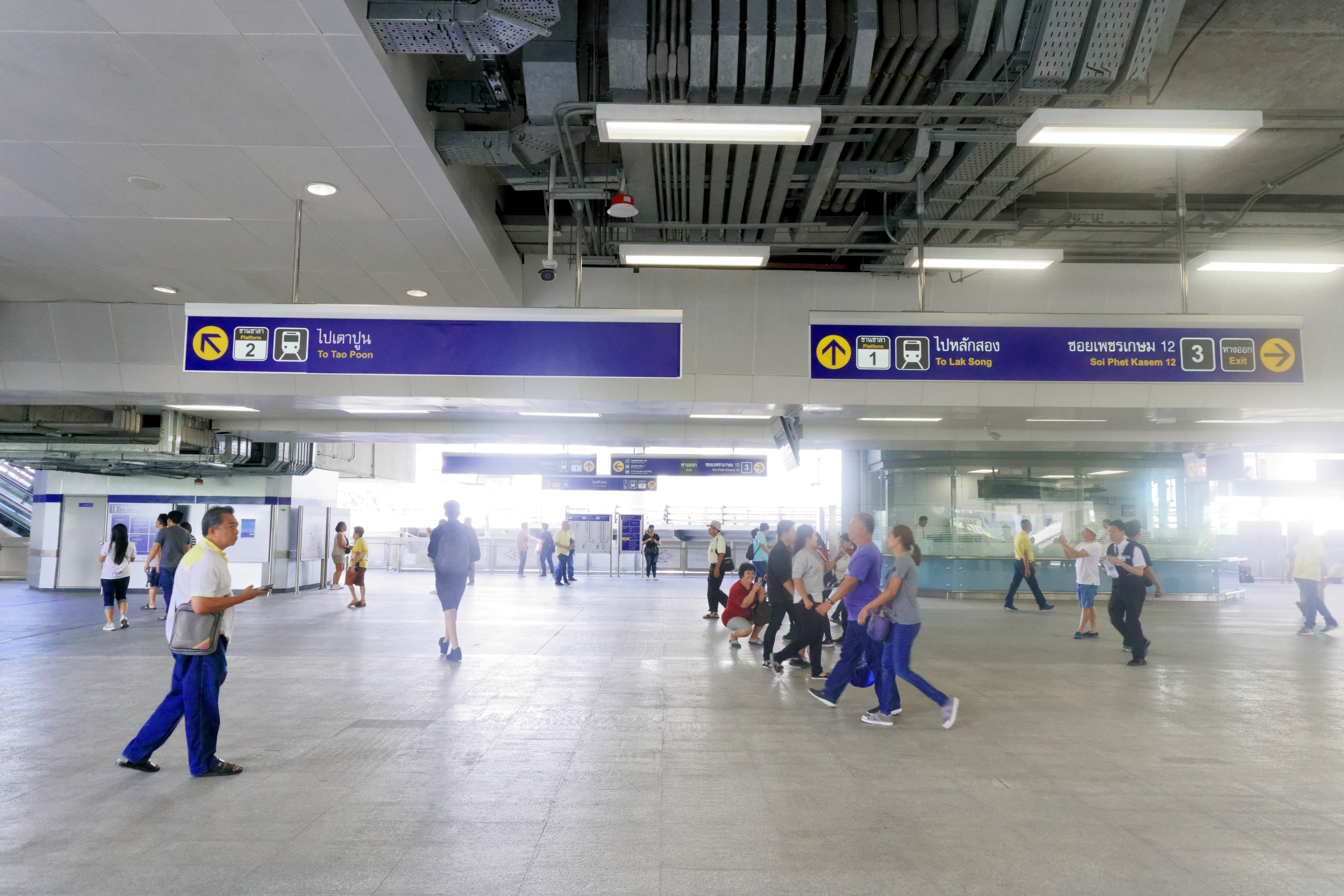
Station concourse

== In popular culture ==
The station, along with the nearby Talat Phlu neighbourhood and Talat Phlu railway station, was featured in the 2024 movie How To Make Millions Before Grandma Dies.
