= Kudi Charoenphat =

Mosque in Bangkok, Thailand

- กุฎีเจริญพาศน์
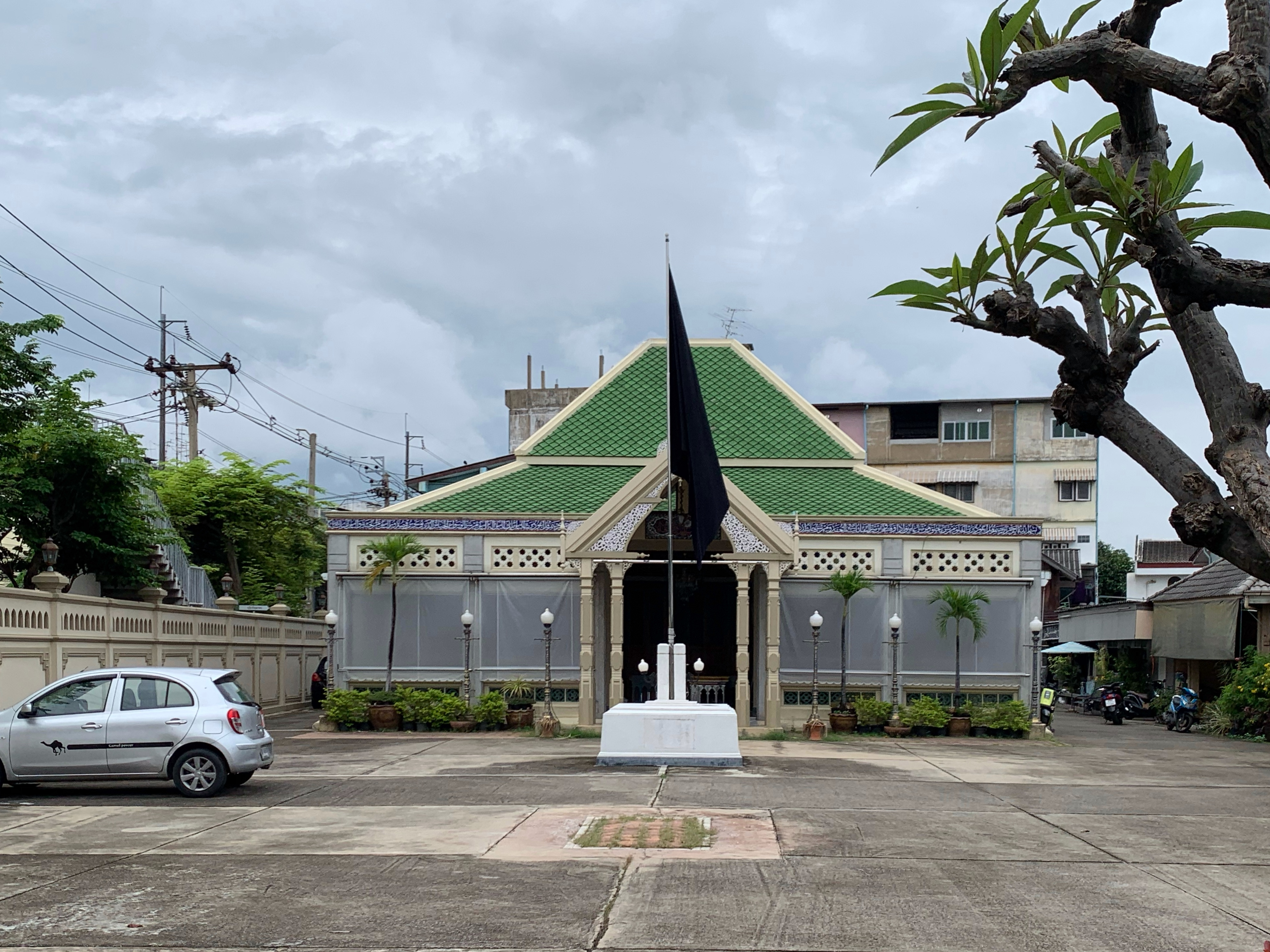
- Imam Barah Charoenpasana, 2021

- Location of the mosque in Bangkok

Religion
- Affiliation: Shia Islam
- Ecclesiastical or organisational status: Mosque
- Status: Active

Location
- Location: Itsaraphap Road, Wat Arun Subdistrict, Bangkok Yai District, Bangkok, Thonburi
- Country: Thailand
- Coordinates: 13°44′13″N 100°29′12″E

Architecture
- Type: Mosque architecture
- Style: Gingerbread
- Founder: Phraya Chula Ratchamontri II (Akayi)
- Completed: 1785

The Kudi Charoenphat (Thai: กุฎีเจริญพาศน์) is a Shia (Note: Thai: เจ้าเซ็น, romanized: Chao Sen) mosque, located in the Bangkok Yai District of Bangkok, Thonburi, in Thailand. The mosque was built during the reign of King Phutthayotfa Chulalok (Rama I) by Phraya Chula Ratchamontri II (Akayi) since early Rattanakosin era.

== Overview ==
The second mosque after Kudi Luang (กุฎีหลวง) is located by Bang Luang Canal, also known as Bangkok Yai Canal side close to Charoenphat Bridge (สะพานเจริญพาศน์). Formerly called Kudi Lang (กุฎีล่าง, lit. 'Lower Mosque') because it was located on the south of Kudi Bon (กุฎีบน, lit. 'Upper Mosque') which was situated on Chao Phraya River bank close to the Phra Racha Wang Derm (Thonburi Palace), the monastery's name has been changed to the present one since the reign of King Vajiravudh (Rama VI) when Charoenphat Bridge was constructed. The building was built in Manila-styled and gingerbread, and is decorated with fretworks.

The Charoenphat area is the most populated quarter of Chao Sen Muslims. The area is annually used by Chao Sen Shia sect Muslims in the religious ceremony during the Islamic month of Muharram.

For the word "Kudi" or "Kadi" (กะดี), as defined by the Royal Institute Dictionary means "The cottage of priest, monk and meaning place of worship of Islam Shia sect."

== See also ==
- Islam in Thailand
- List of mosques in Thailand
