= Bangkok Yai district =

District in Bangkok, Thailand

Bangkok Yai บางกอกใหญ่
- Khet
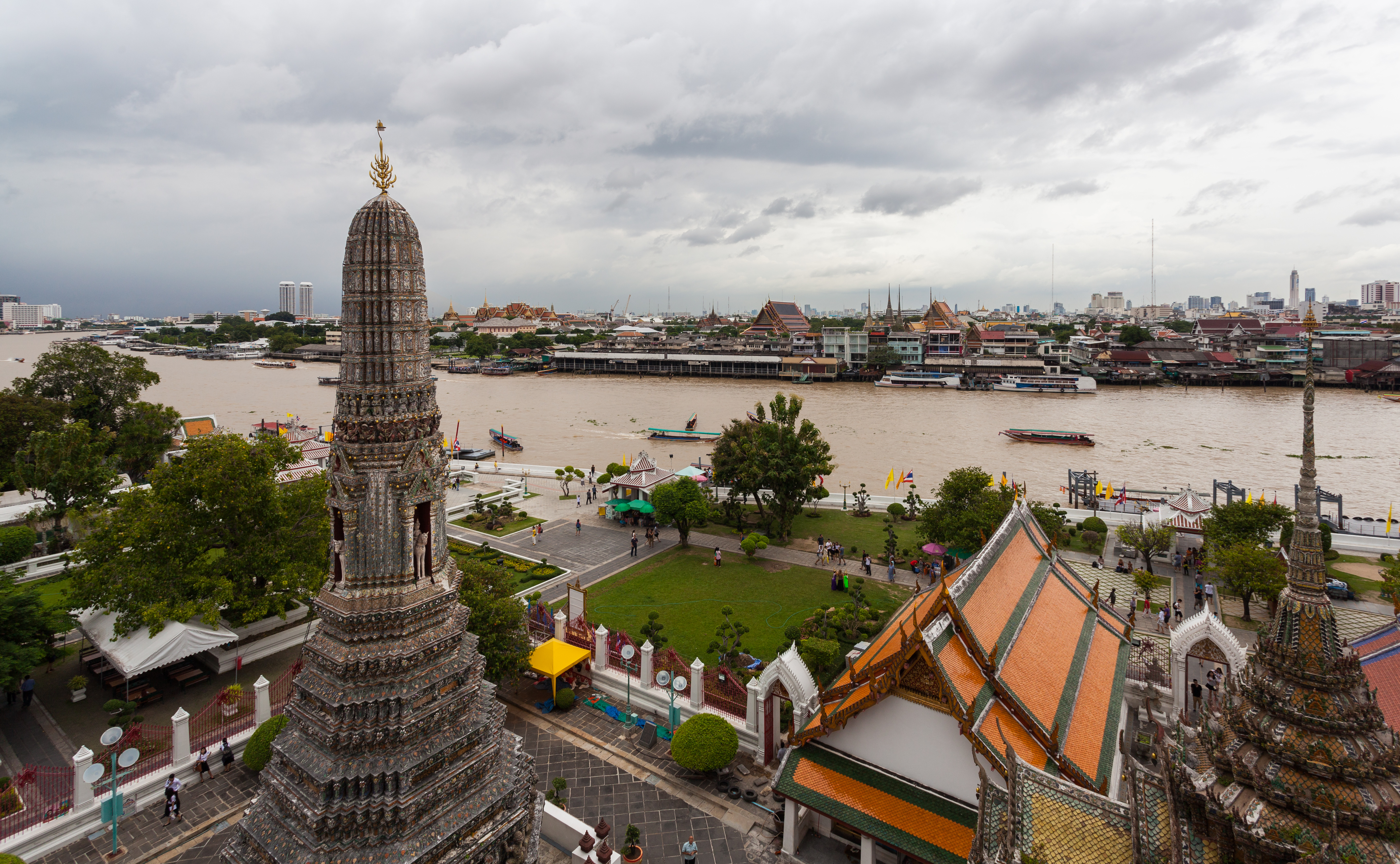
- Area around Wat Arun (taken photo from Prang of Wat Arun), across the Chao Phraya River is Phra Nakhon's Tha Tian neighbourhood

- Khet location in Bangkok
- Coordinates: 13°43′22″N 100°28′35″E
- Country: Thailand
- Province: Bangkok
- Seat: Wat Tha Phra
- Khwaeng: 2

Area
  - Total: 6.18 km^{2} (2.39 sq mi)

Population (2017)
  - Total: 67,768
  - Density: 10,965.69/km^{2} (28,401.0/sq mi)
- Time zone: UTC+7 (ICT)
- Postal code: 10600
- Geocode: 1016

Bangkok Yai (Thai: บางกอกใหญ่, pronounced [bāːŋ.kɔ̀ːk jàj]) is one of the 50 districts (khet) of Bangkok, Thailand. Neighbouring districts are (from north clockwise) Bangkok Noi, Phra Nakhon (across Chao Phraya River), Thon Buri, Phasi Charoen, and Taling Chan.

== History ==
The district is named after Khlong Bangkok Yai (คลองบางกอกใหญ่, also called Khlong Bang Luang, คลองบางหลวง) which was actually part of Chao Phraya River until a canal dug in 1522 during the Ayutthaya period altered the flow of the river such that the canal became the main river and the section of original river became present-day Khlong Bangkok Yai. Bangkok Yai, or more precisely, the Wat Arun Sub-district, was also the site of Thon Buri when the capital was set up here from 1767-1782.

Originally called Amphoe Hongsaram (อำเภอหงสาราม) when the district was set up in 1915, it was renamed "Amphoe Bangkok Yai" in 1916, demoted to a king amphoe of amphoe Bang Yi Khan (อำเภอบางยี่ขัน) in 1938, promoted back to amphoe in 1958, and finally changed to a khet in an administrative reform in 1972.

== Administration ==
The district is sub-divided into two sub-districts (khwaeng).

No.	Name	Thai	Area (km^{2})	Map
1.	Wat Arun	วัดอรุณ	0.834	Map
2.	Wat Tha Phra	วัดท่าพระ	5.346	Map
Total			6.180	Map

== Places ==
=== Temples ===
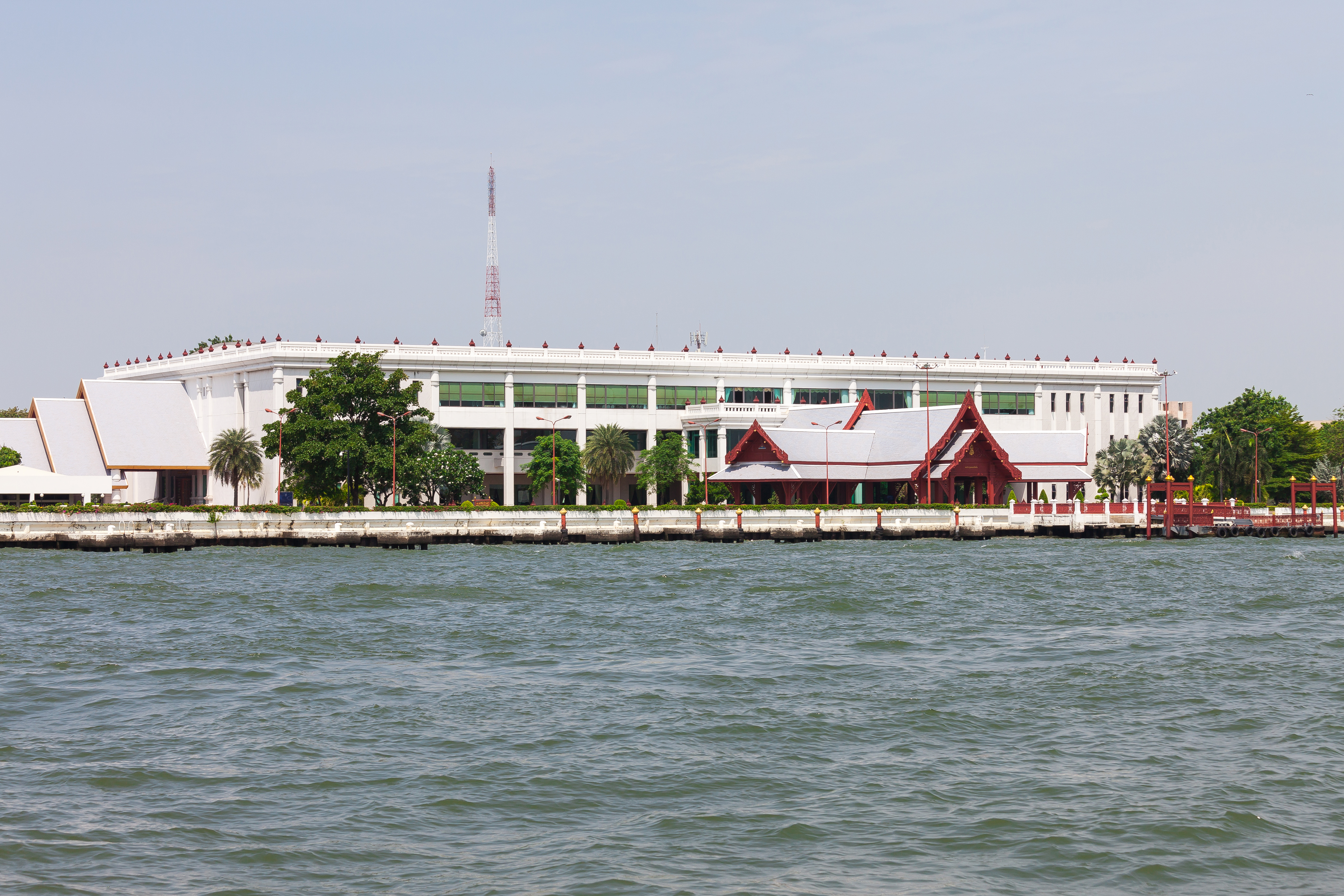
Royal Thai Navy Convention Center

Wichai Prasit Fort and Wat Arun

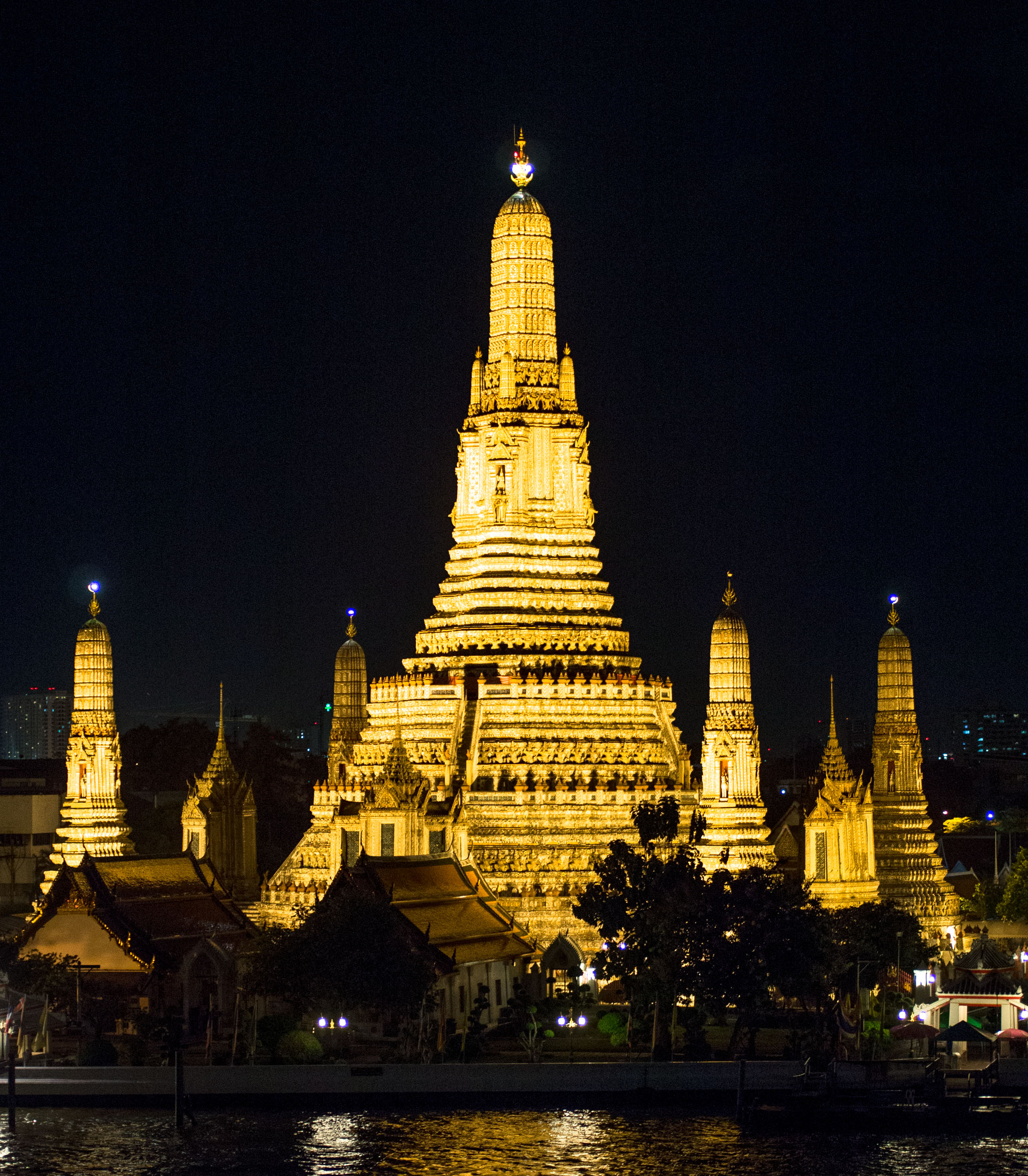
Prang of Wat Arun in night

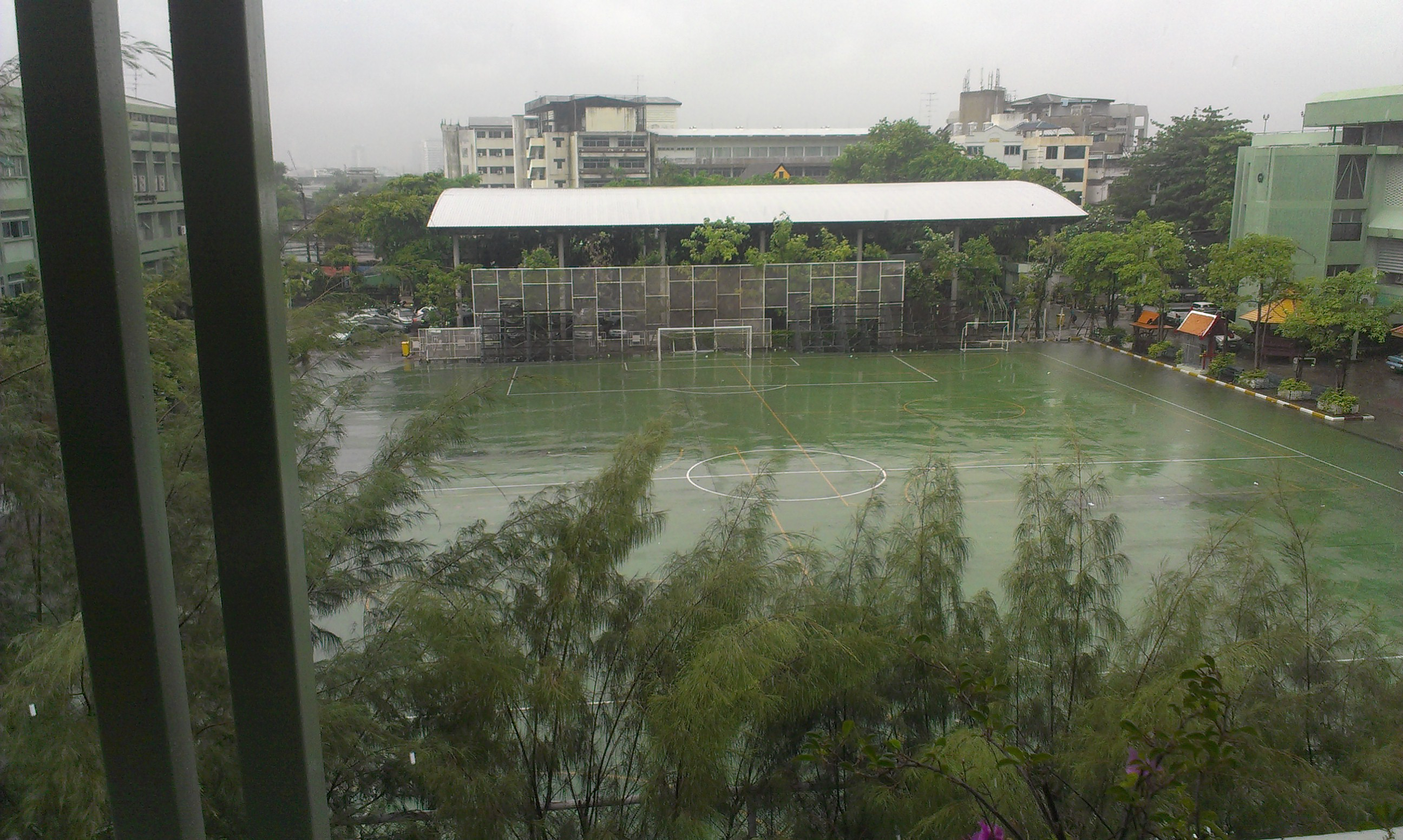
Taweethapisek School

- Wat Arun
- Wat Hong Rattanaram
- Wat Khruea Wan
- Wat Molilokkayaram
- Wat Ratchasittharam
- Wat Nak Klang
- Wat Tha Phra
- Wat Chao Mun
- Wat Diduat
- Wat Pradu Chimphli
- Wat Pradu Nai Songtham
- Wat Sangkrachai
- Wat Mai Phiren

=== Historic sites ===
- Wang Derm Palace
- Wichai Prasit Fort

=== Education ===
- Taweethapisek School
- Ratchadamnoen Commercial School
- Wiboon Business Administration College
- Siam Technological College
- Sesawech Vidhaya School
- Ritthinarongron School
- Wat Pradu Nai Songtham School
- Bangkok Commercial School
- Saiprasit Business Administration Technological
- Saiprasit School
- Prasart Wittaya Anuchon School

=== Government offices ===
- Royal Thai Navy Convention Center
- The Kingdom of Lesotho Consulate
- Bangkokyai Police Station
- Tha Phra Police Station

== Transportation ==
- Tha Phra Intersection
- Tha Phra MRT station
- Chao Phraya River
- Khlong Bangkok Yai
- Khlong Mon
- Phanitchayakan Thon Buri Junction
- Itsaraphap MRT station

=== Main roads ===
- Phet Kasem Road
- Charan Sanit Wong Road
- Itsaraphap Road
- Ratchadaphisek Road
- Arun Amarin Road
