= Thonburi =

Former Thai capital city

Coordinates: 13°43′30″N 100°29′09″E

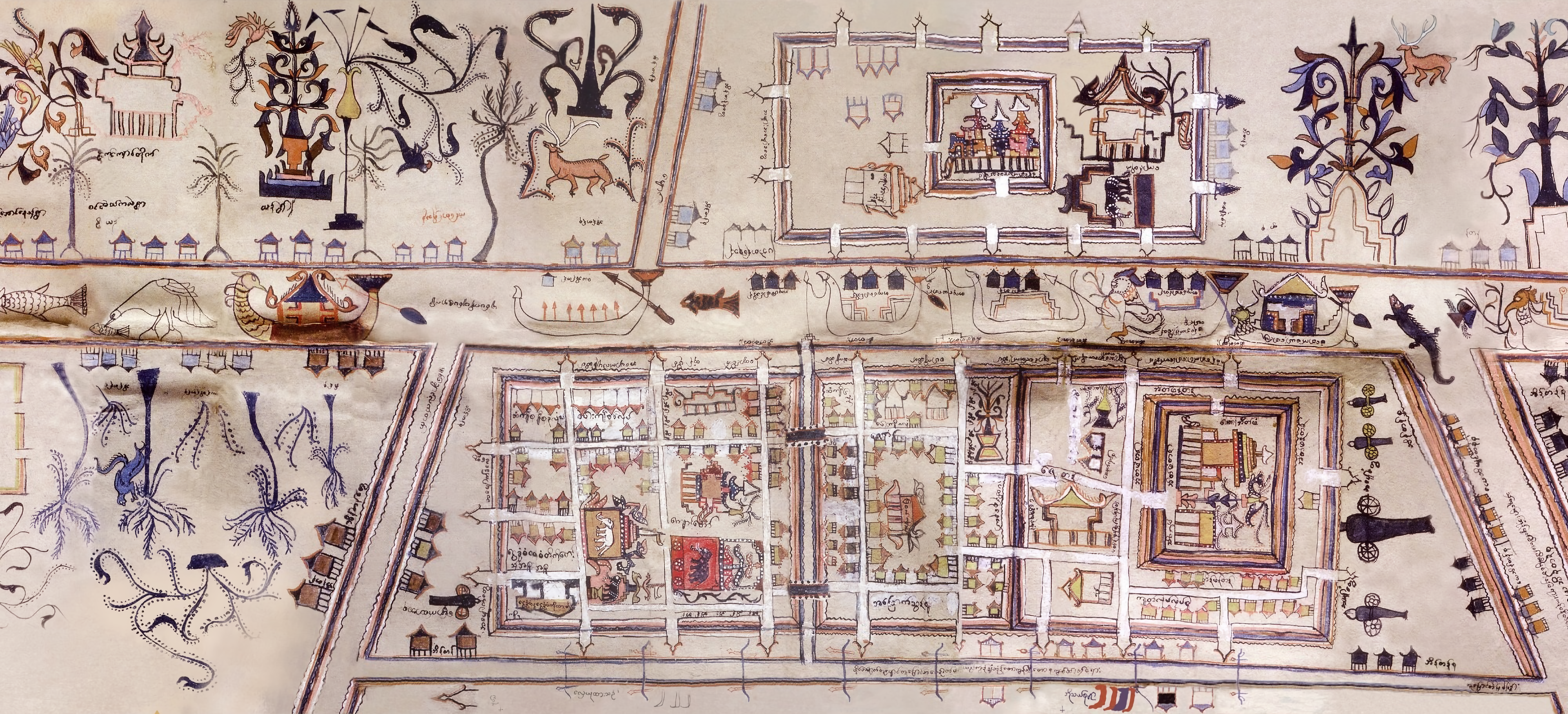
Thonburi map detail, made by a Burmese spy, 18th century

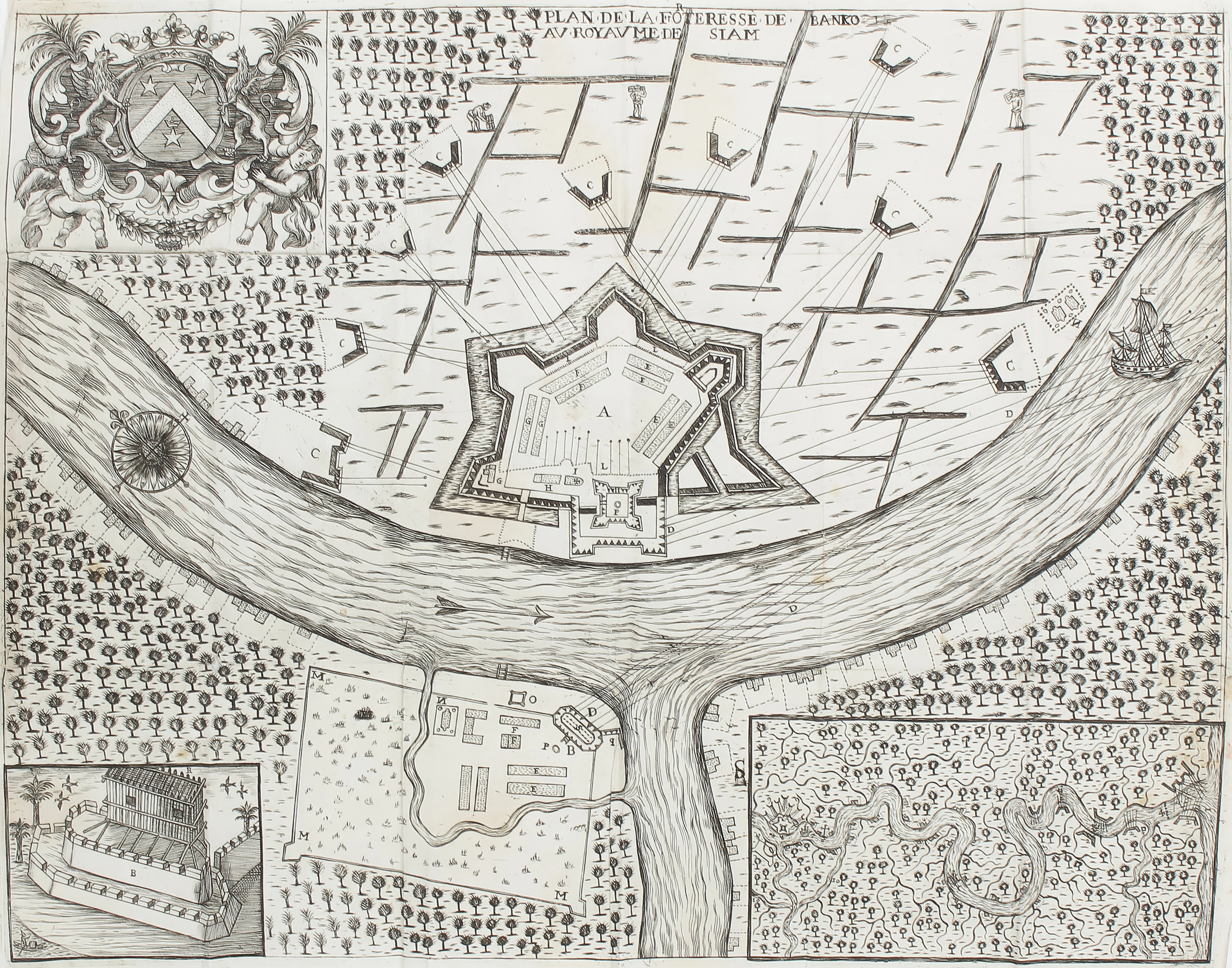
The city of Thonburi, on the right (west) bank of the Chao Phraya (here in the lower left corner of the map), facing the fortress of Bangkok, during the 1688 Siege of Bangkok

Historical map of Thonburi on Chao Phraya River

Thonburi (Thai: ธนบุรี, Thai pronunciation: [tʰōn.bù.rīː]) is an area of modern Bangkok. During the era of the Ayutthaya Kingdom, its location on the right (west) bank at the mouth of the Chao Phraya River had made it an important garrison town, which is reflected in its name: thon (ธน) a loanword from Pali dhána 'wealth', and buri (บุรี), from púra, 'fortress'. The full formal name was Thon Buri Si Mahasamut (กรุงธนบุรีศรีมหาสมุทร 'City of Treasures Gracing the Ocean'). For the informal name, see the history of Bangkok under Ayutthaya.

In 1767, after the sack of Ayutthaya by the Burmese armies, General Taksin took back Thonburi and, by right of conquest, made it the capital of the Thonburi Kingdom, crowning himself king until 6 April 1782, when he was deposed. Rama I, the newly enthroned king, moved the capital across the river, where stakes driven into the soil of Bangkok for the City Pillar at 06:45 on 21 April 1782 marked the official founding of the new capital. Thonburi remained an independent town and province, until it was merged with Bangkok in 1971. Thonburi stayed less developed than the other side of the river. Many of the traditional small waterways, khlongs, still exist there, while they are nearly gone from the other side of the river.

In 1950, Bangkok had around 1.3 million inhabitants, and the municipality of Thonburi around 400,000. In 1970 Thonburi was Thailand's second largest city proper with around 600,000 residents.

Wongwian Yai is a landmark of Thonburi District.

== Administration ==
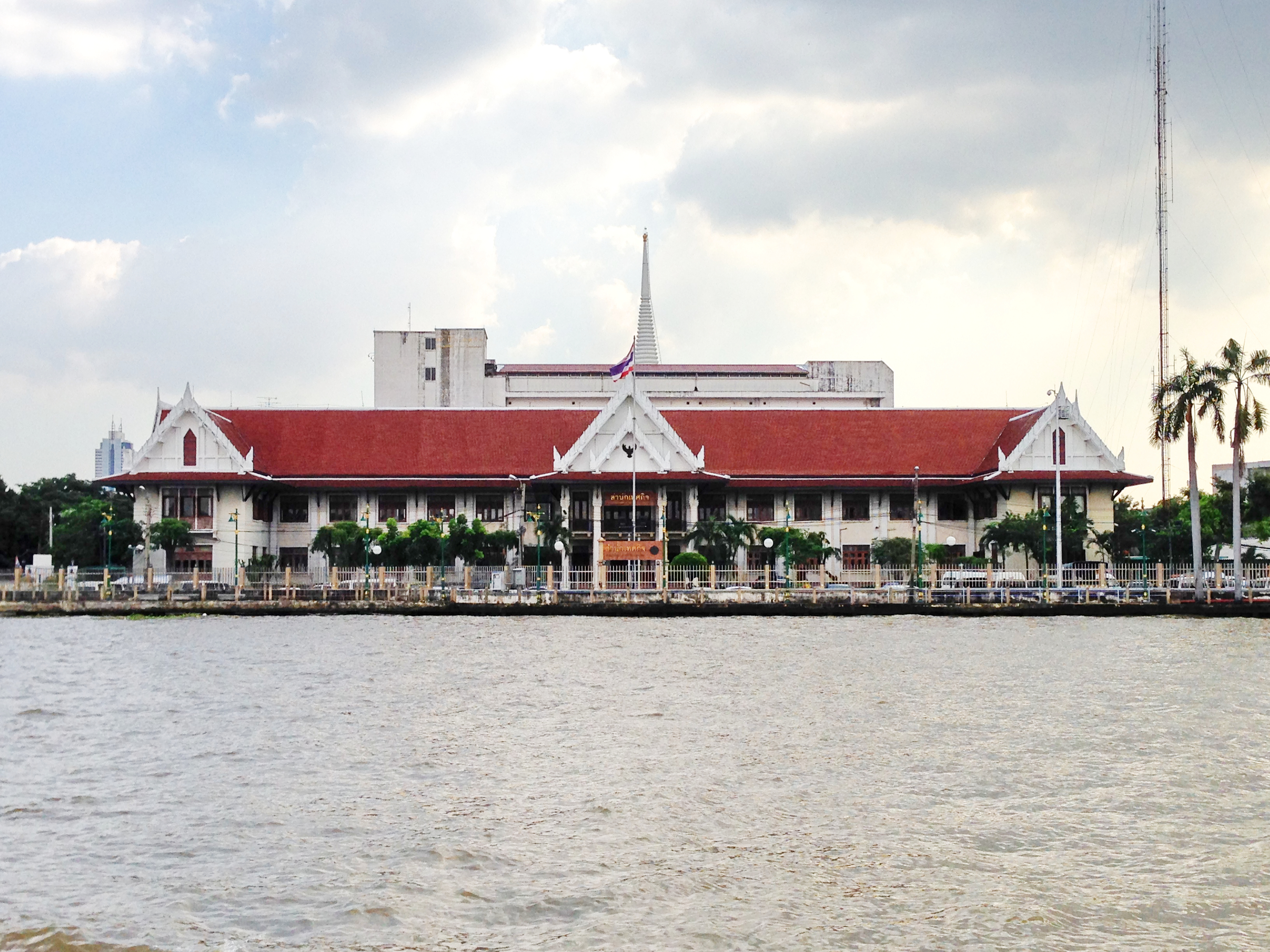
Three Thai-style pavilions adjacent to each other in front of Wat Prayurawongsawat rim Chao Phraya River (opposite Yodpiman River Walk), now head office of City Law Enforcement Department, BMA (formerly Thonburi Provincial Hall)

At the time of the merger, Thonburi province consisted of nine districts (amphoe).

1.	Ratchakhruet (Thon Buri)	ราชคฤห์ (ธนบุรี)
2.	Hongsaram (Bangkok Yai)	หงสาราม (บางกอกใหญ่)
3.	Buppharam (Khlong San)	บุปผาราม (คลองสาน)
4.	Taling Chan	ตลิ่งชัน
5.	Bangkok Noi	บางกอกน้อย
6.	Bang Khun Thian	บางขุนเทียน
7.	Phasi Charoen	ภาษีเจริญ
8.	Nong Khaem	หนองแขม
9.	Rat Burana	ราษฎร์บูรณะ

As of 2012, these have been reorganized into 15 districts.
