= Bo Bo Gyi =

Burmese guardian deity of Buddhist temples and pagodas

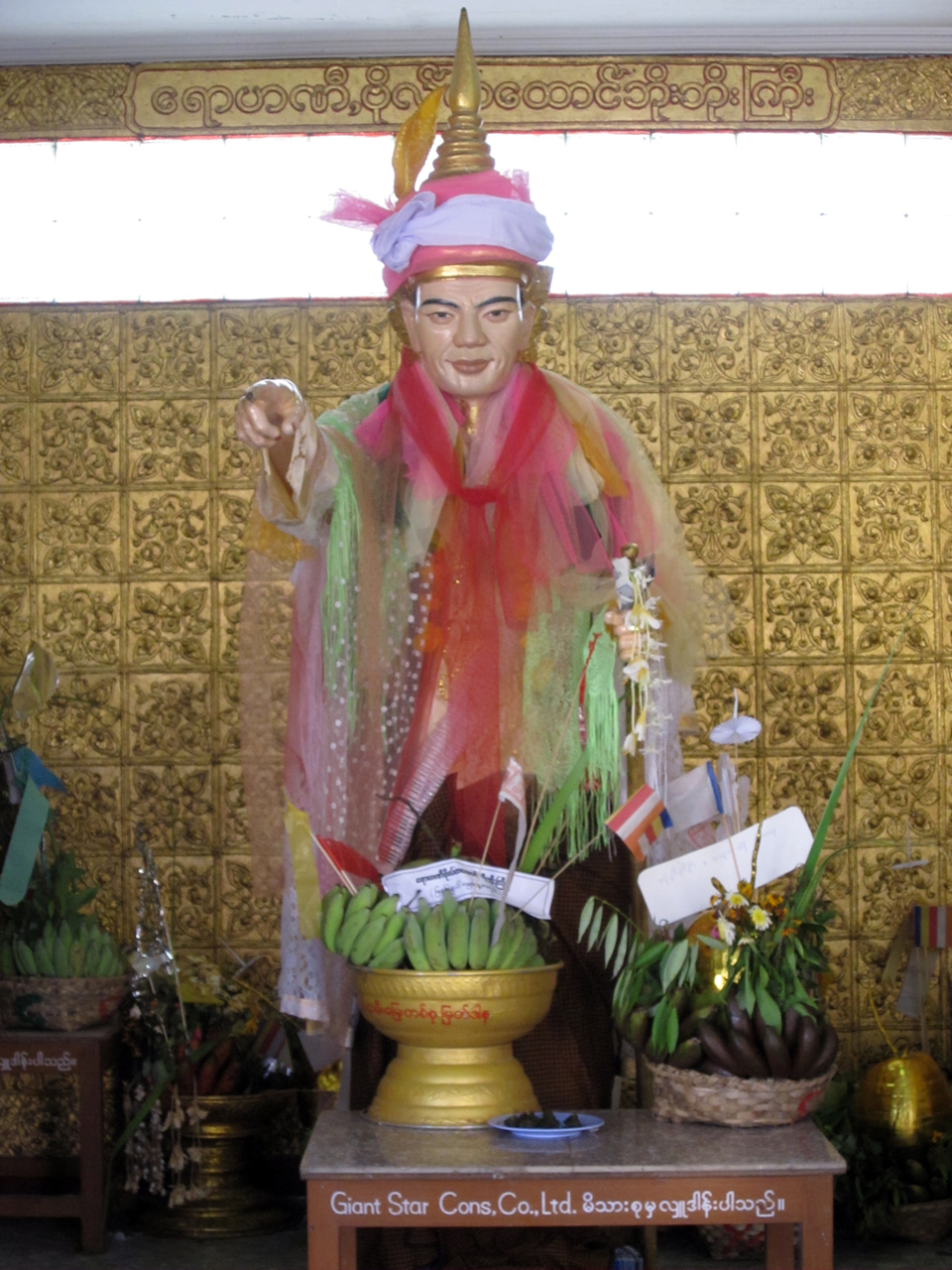
Botahtaung Pagoda's Rohani Bo Bo Gyi shrine and image.

Bo Bo Gyi (Burmese: ဘိုးဘိုးကြီး, pronounced [bó bó dʑí]; lit. 'hallowed grandfather') traditionally refers to the name of a guardian deity (called nat) unique to each Burmese Buddhist temple or pagoda. Bo Bo Gyi is typically depicted as a nearly life-sized elderly man, dressed in a curved cap and sometimes carrying a cane, to signify old age. Offerings of scarves and paso are common by worshipers.

Bo Bo Gyi also a term of address, literally translating as "respected grandfather", and sometimes is used to address any of the Thrity Seven Nats of the official pantheon of Burmese folk religion. Bo Bo Gyi is also seen as a tree spirit, especially in more rural communities. There are many Bo Bo Gyi shrines throughout the country, and some are more widely respected than others. The Shwenyaungbin (Golden Banyan Tree) Bo Bo Gyi shrine between Yangon and Bago is often visited by new car owners hoping to have their cars blessed by the Bo Bo Gyi spirit at that site. The number of Bo Bo Gyi shrines has increased since the 1980s in the urban context, with larger painted statues expanding the size of the shirnes placed around threes in Yangon. The most well known of these urban Bo Bo Gyi shrines is the regularly refurbished one in Golden Valley, a wealthy neighbourhood.

Bo Bo Gyi also has a role as a guardian of pagodas and Buddhist sanctuaries. Their shrines at various pagodas are often surrounded by weizza figures.

According to a legend of Shwedagon Pagoda, the Gautama Buddha's hair relics were given to two Mon merchants who later gave them to the King of Yangon, wanting the relics to be properly enshrined in a pagoda. Bo Bo Gyi, as an avatar of Indra, came down to earth and pointed his finger to the proper location where that pagoda should be built, which is where the Shwedagon Pagoda is. Hence, he is popularly depicted as a figure pointing his finger as a reference to this legend.

Bo Bo Gyi is highly respected amongst Thai people as thep than chai (Thai: เทพทันใจ; the deity [who may grant your wish] immediately). Many believe that praying to, wishing to, and having their forehead touched by the deity's pointing finger of the thep than chai, especially at Botataung Pagoda in Yangon, will bring them luck.

== Images ==
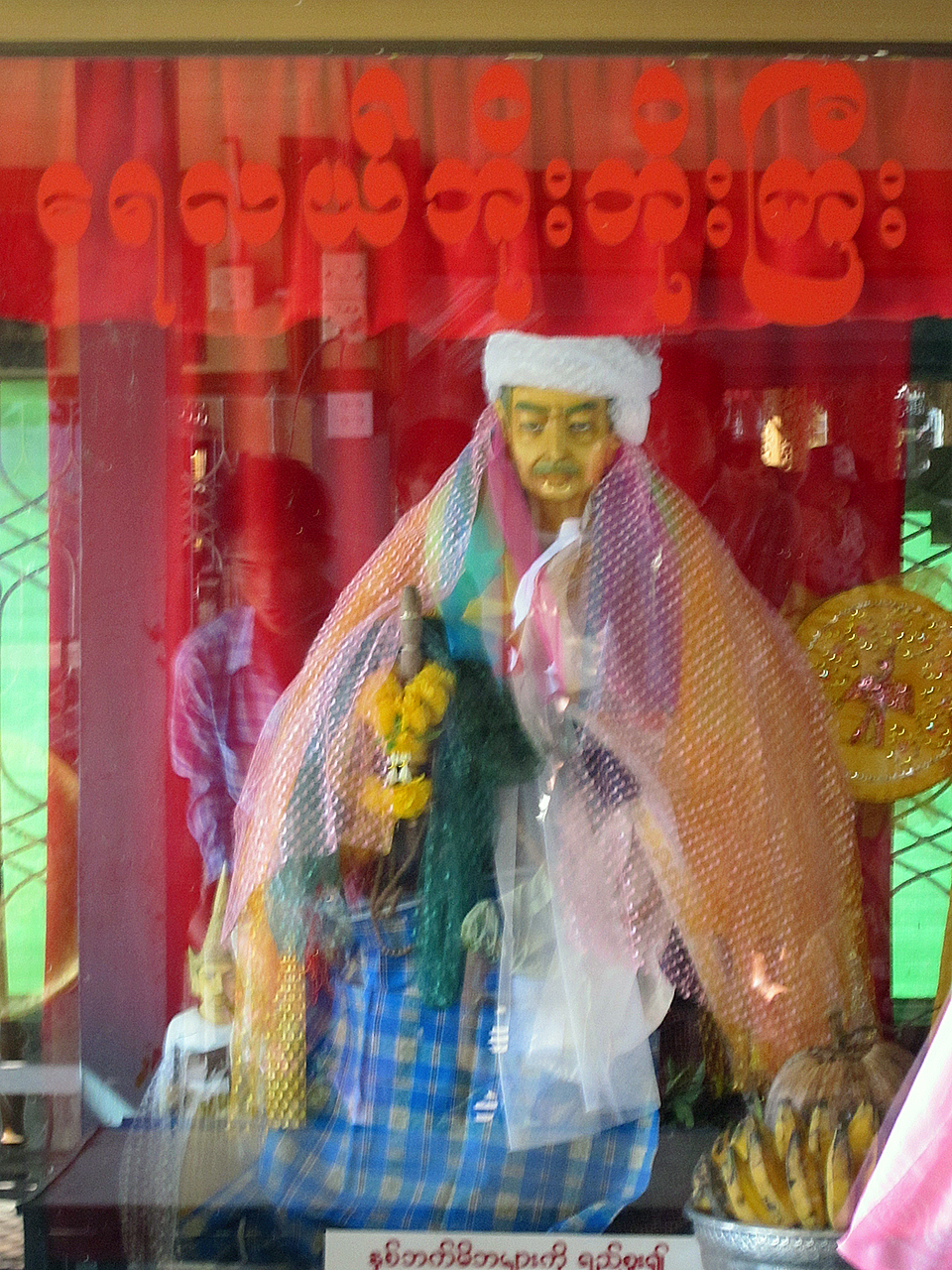
Bo Bo Gyi shrine at the Yay-Le Pagoda in Kyauktan

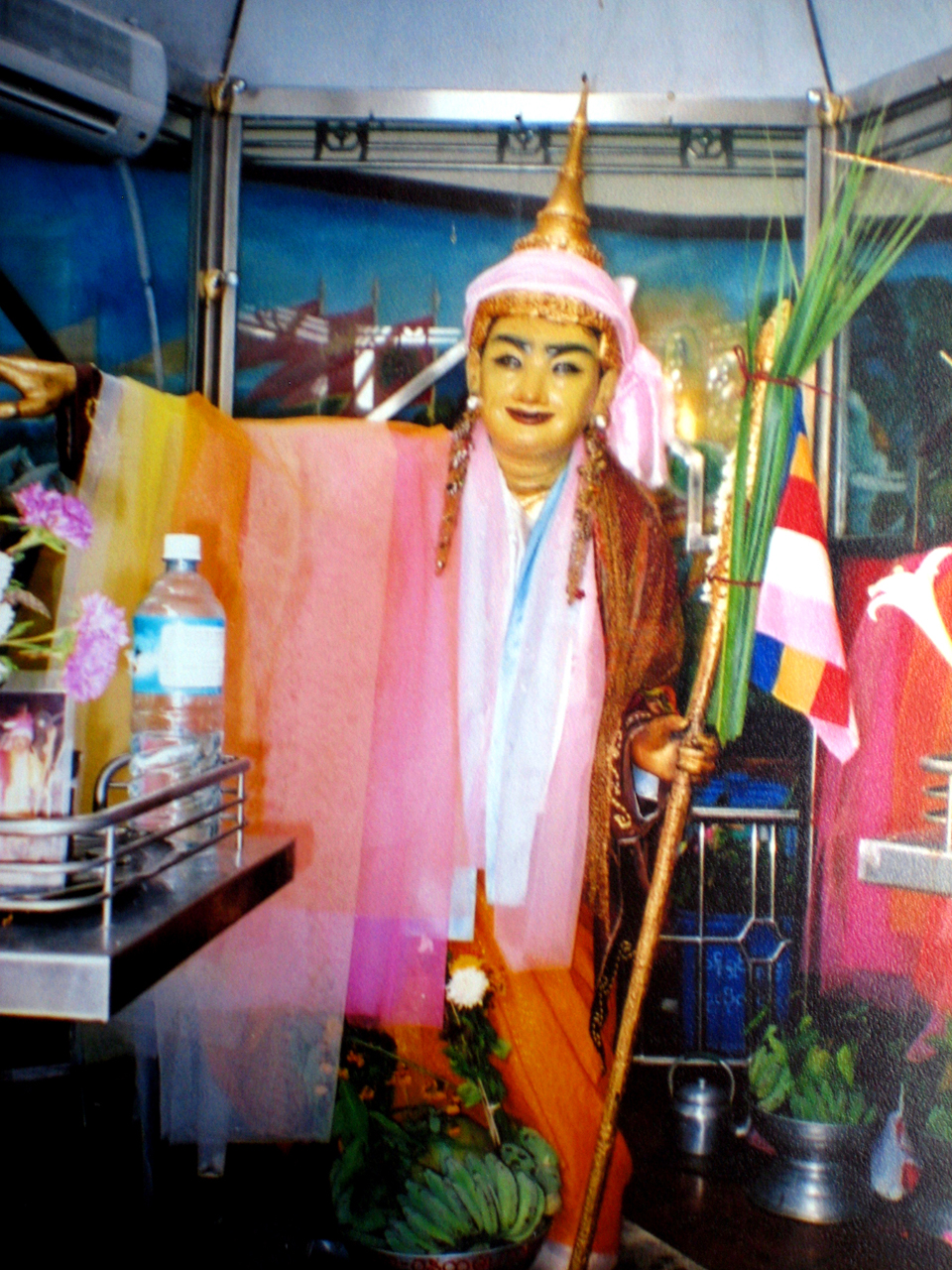
Bo Bo Gyi shrine at Sule Pagoda in Yangon

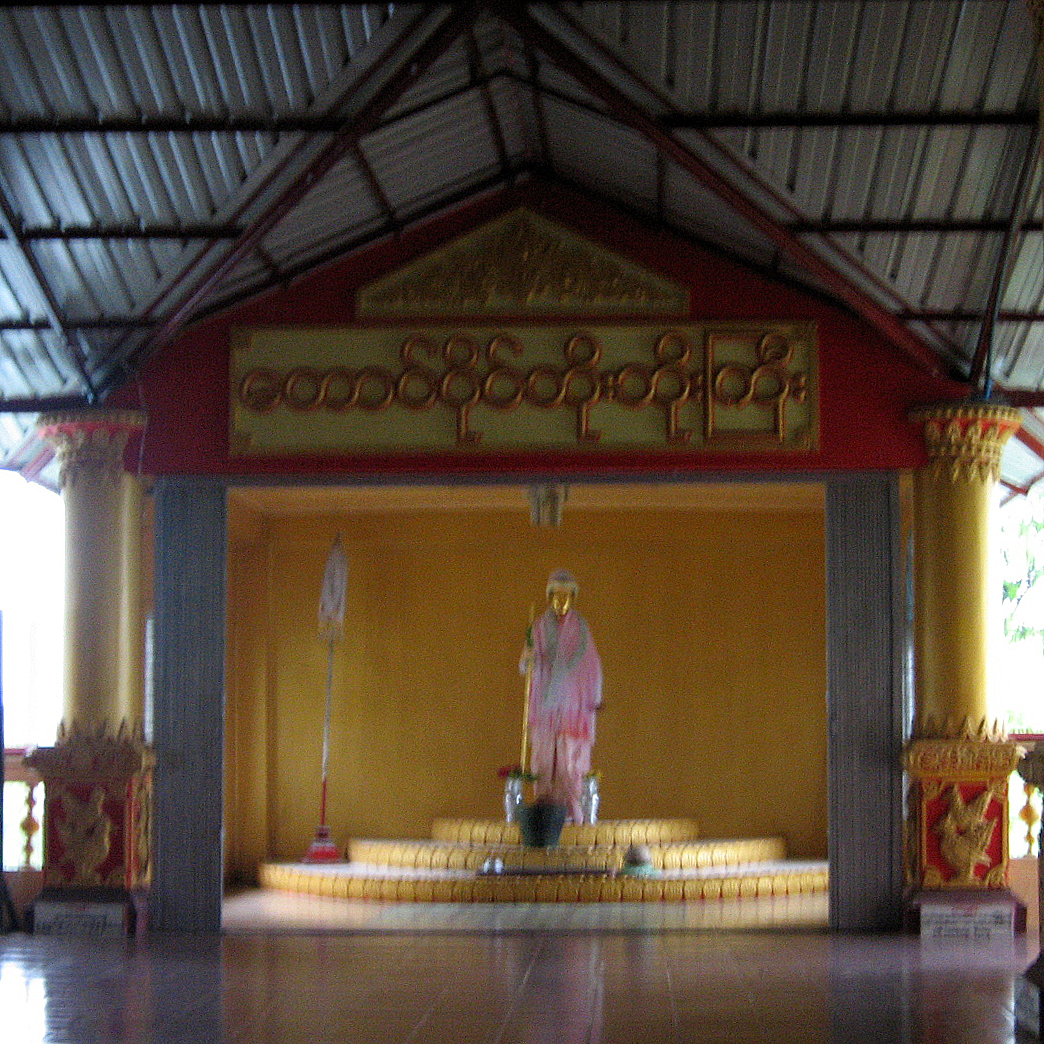
Bo Bo Gyi shrine in Bago

Bo Bo Gyi statue in Wat Hong Rattanaram, Bangkok, Thailand
