= Botataung Pagoda =

Buddhist Pagoda in downtown Yangon, Myanmar

- ဗိုလ်တထောင်ဘုရား
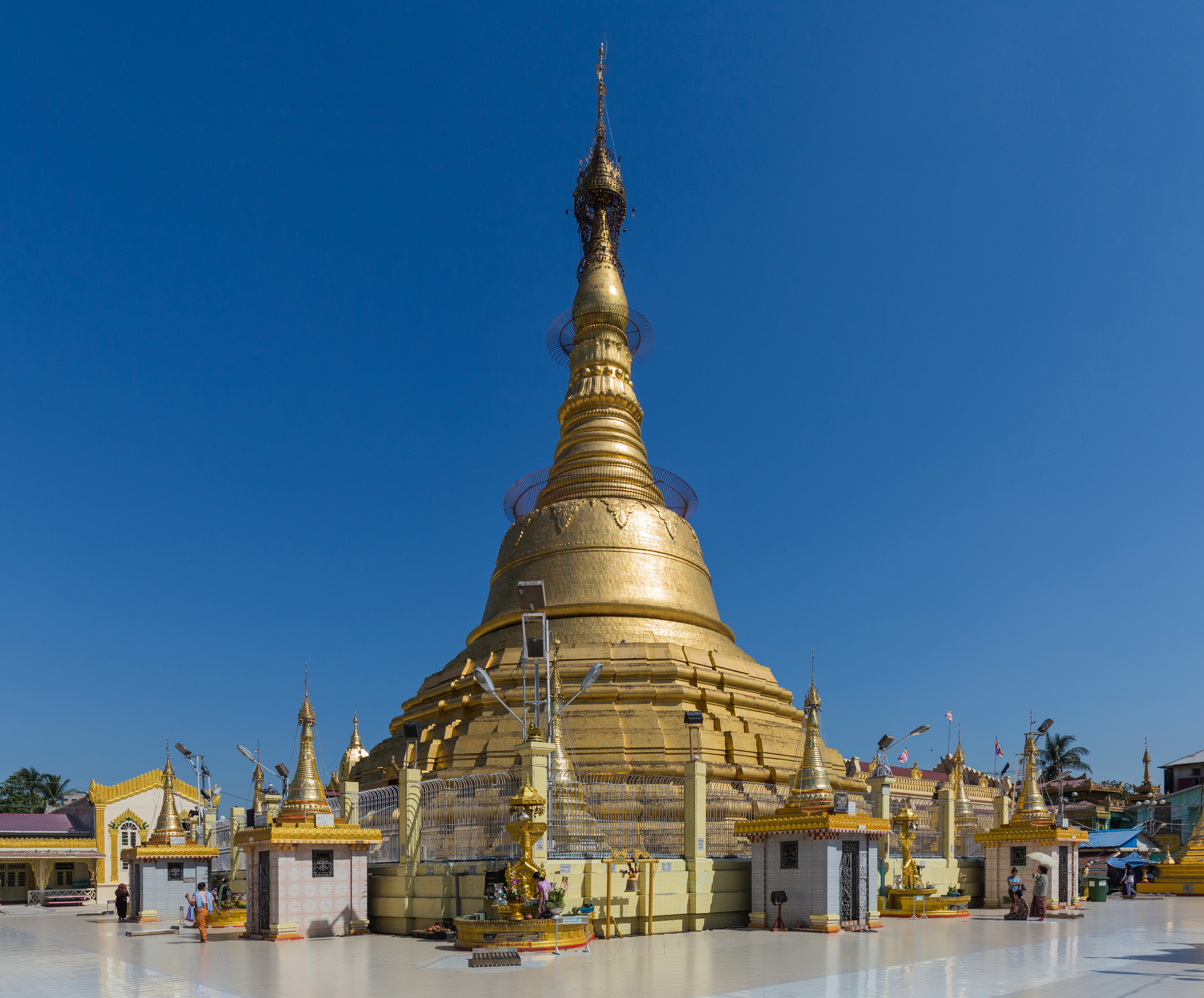

- Location within Myanmar

Religion
- Affiliation: Theravada Buddhism
- Status: Operational

Location
- Location: Yangon
- Country: Myanmar
- Coordinates: 16.768449°N 96.171973°E

Yangon City Landmark

The Botataung Kyaik De Att Pagoda (Burmese: ဗိုလ်တထောင်ကျိုက်ဒေးအပ်ဆံတော်ရှင်စေတီတော် [bòtətʰàʊɰ̃ pʰəjá]; also spelled Botahtaung; literally "1000 military officers") is a famous pagoda located in downtown Yangon, Myanmar, near the Yangon river. The pagoda was first built by the Mon people around the same time as the Shwedagon Pagoda—according to local belief, over 2,500 years ago, and was known as Kyaik-de-att in Mon language. The pagoda is hollowed within, and houses what is believed to be a sacred hair of The Buddha.

The Botataung Pagoda was destroyed during World War II and was rebuilt after the war.

== History ==
According to Burmese tradition, it was on a hillock at this site that one thousand military officers of the king were drawn up as a guard of honor to welcome the landing in Burma of the relics of the Buddha brought over from India more than two thousand years ago. An account from ancient histories of the building of the Pagoda states that the Buddhist king Sihadipa gave one of his ministers a sacred hair from the Buddha's head and two body relics and this minister, renowned for his goodness and faith, consulted a famous religious leader and, on his advice, chose the Botataung Mount on the bank of Yangon River at a distance one thousand tars (7,000 cubits) in a south-easterly direction from the Shwedagon Pagoda and there enshrined the sacred relics.

=== World War II ===
The pagoda was completely destroyed on 8 November 1943 when the RAF, which was bombing the nearby Yangon wharves and destroyed the pagoda too. The pagoda was left in "blackened ruins".

=== Rebuilding ===
Rebuilding of the pagoda started on the same day that the country gained independence from the UK: 4 January 1948. Part of the excavation process, a relic chamber was discovered. The chamber in size 20 sq ft × 20 sq ft (1.9 m^{2} × 1.9 m^{2}) and 6 ft (1.8 m) in height gradually decreasing in size towards the top and appearing like a huge pot placed up-sided down to cover completely what lay inside.

In the very center of this treasure vault was discovered a wonderful stone casket in the shape of a pagoda with a diameter of 23 in (580 mm) and 39 in (990 mm) high. Encircling this stone casket were figures of nats carved out of laterite and evidently placed there to act as sentinels. The casket was immersed in mud as water had trickled into the vault during the many centuries it had been there. With this pagoda-shaped stone casket within the relic chamber were found various kinds of treasures: precious stones, ornaments, jewelry, terracotta plaques and images of gold, silver, brass and stone. The total number of these images recovered from within and without the relic chamber was seven hundred. The terracotta plaques, some of them in a fair state of preservation, depict Buddhist scenes.

One of the terracotta plaques excavated from the relic chamber bears an image of the Buddha and though affected by age and moisture it is exceptionally important. On the reverse side are inscribed characters which are very close to the ancient Brahmani script which came from Southern India. It is a precious evidence of ancient times and has been deciphered by U Lu Pe Win, Superintendent Archaeologist, Government of the Union of Burma, who points out that the initial word "e" from "evam vadi" shows that the script is in the manner of the ancient Mons. This is proof of the belief that the people who erected the Pagoda in ancient times were the Mons.

When this cone or stone layer was removed, there was found inside another stone layer of similar shape, but with a brilliant gold coating. This was more representative of a pagoda in shape, while its workmanship inspired feelings of deep religious fervor in the crowd present. Some mud had penetrated the sides of the base, and when it was washed and sifted, precious stones, gold and jewelry were discovered round the base. This second stone casket was then removed, and inside was found a small pagoda of pure gold standing on a silver salver or base. Beside this golden pagoda was a carved stone image 4.5 in (110 mm) high of very ancient workmanship.

When the gold Pagoda was lifted up, a tiny gold cylinder of 3/4 inch (19 mm) length with a diameter of 5/12 inch (11 mm). was found and in this tiny cylinder were found two small body relics each the size of a mustard seed and what is believed to be a Sacred Hair of the Buddha. This hair was coiled round and fastened with a little lacquer on which were traces of gold plaster.

== Structure ==
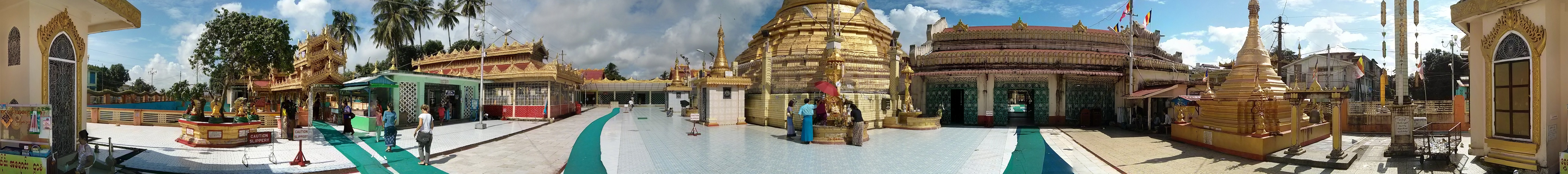
Panoramic view of Botataung area

The new pagoda is of original design and in height 131 feet 8 inches (40.13 m), on a base of 96 feet (29 m) x 96 feet (29 m). The main attraction is the stupa's hollow inside, which has a mirrored maze-like walkway lined with glass showcases containing many ancient relics and artifacts that were sealed inside the earlier pagoda.

== Gallery ==
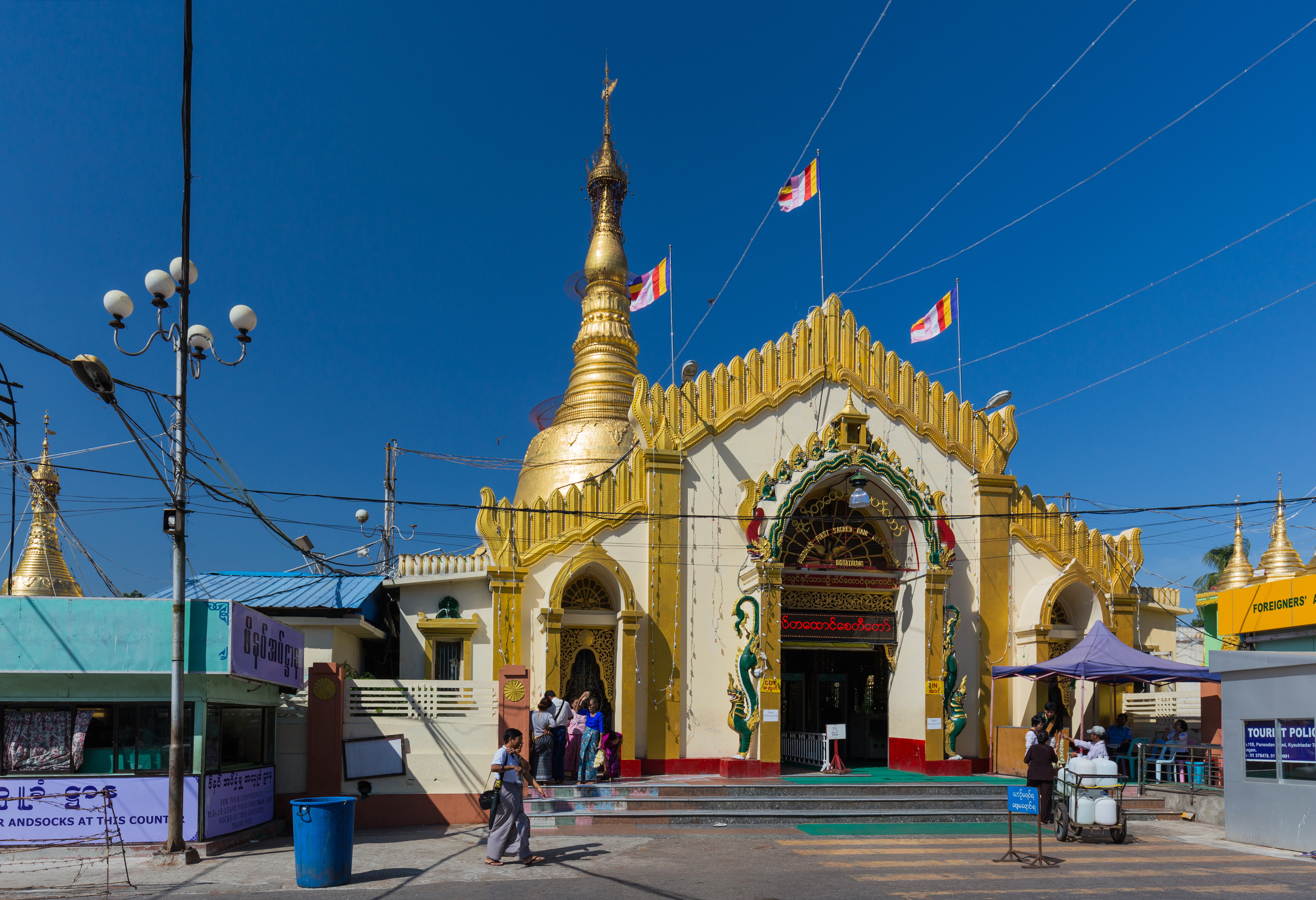
Entrance to pagoda

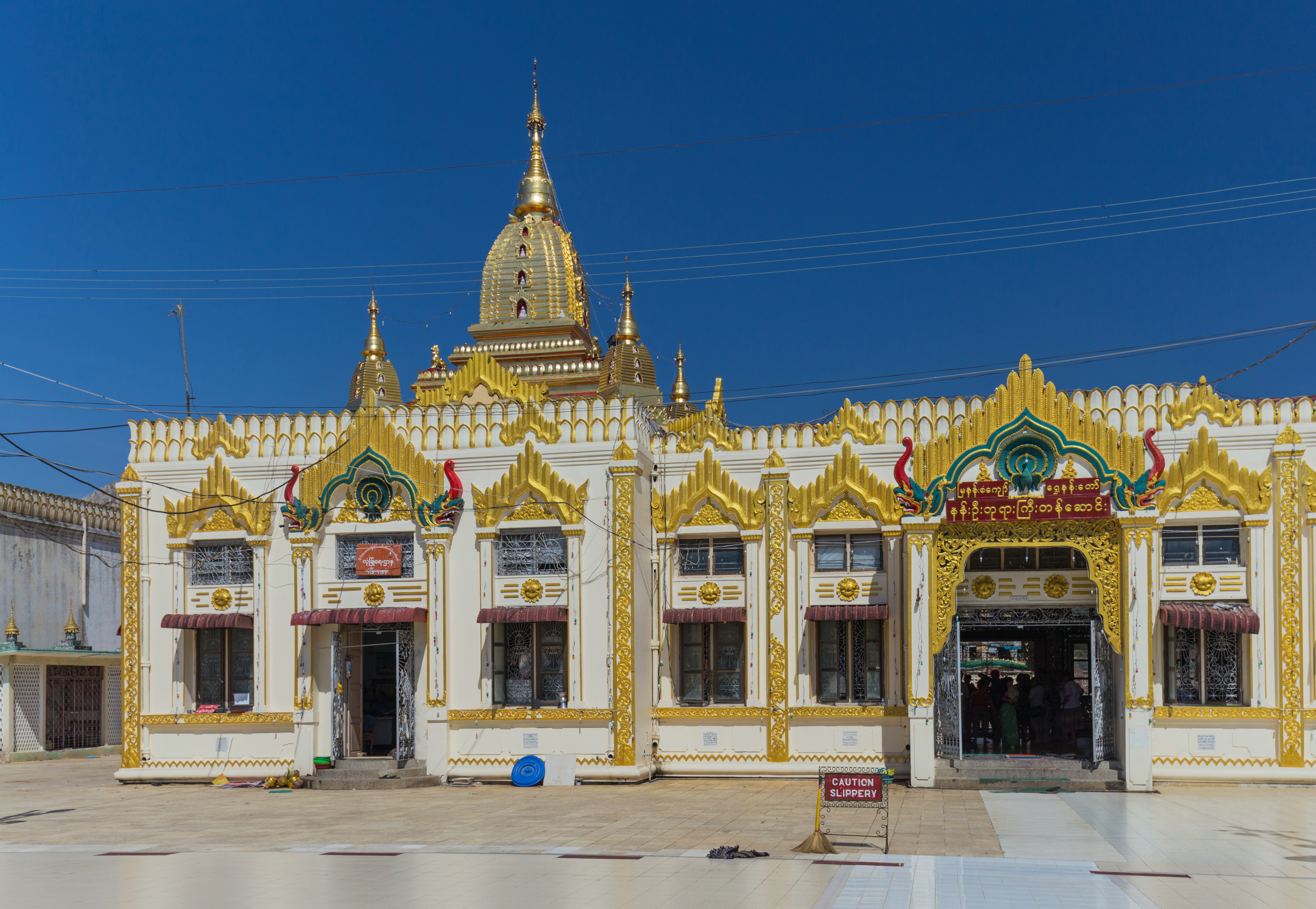
Building inside pagoda's complex

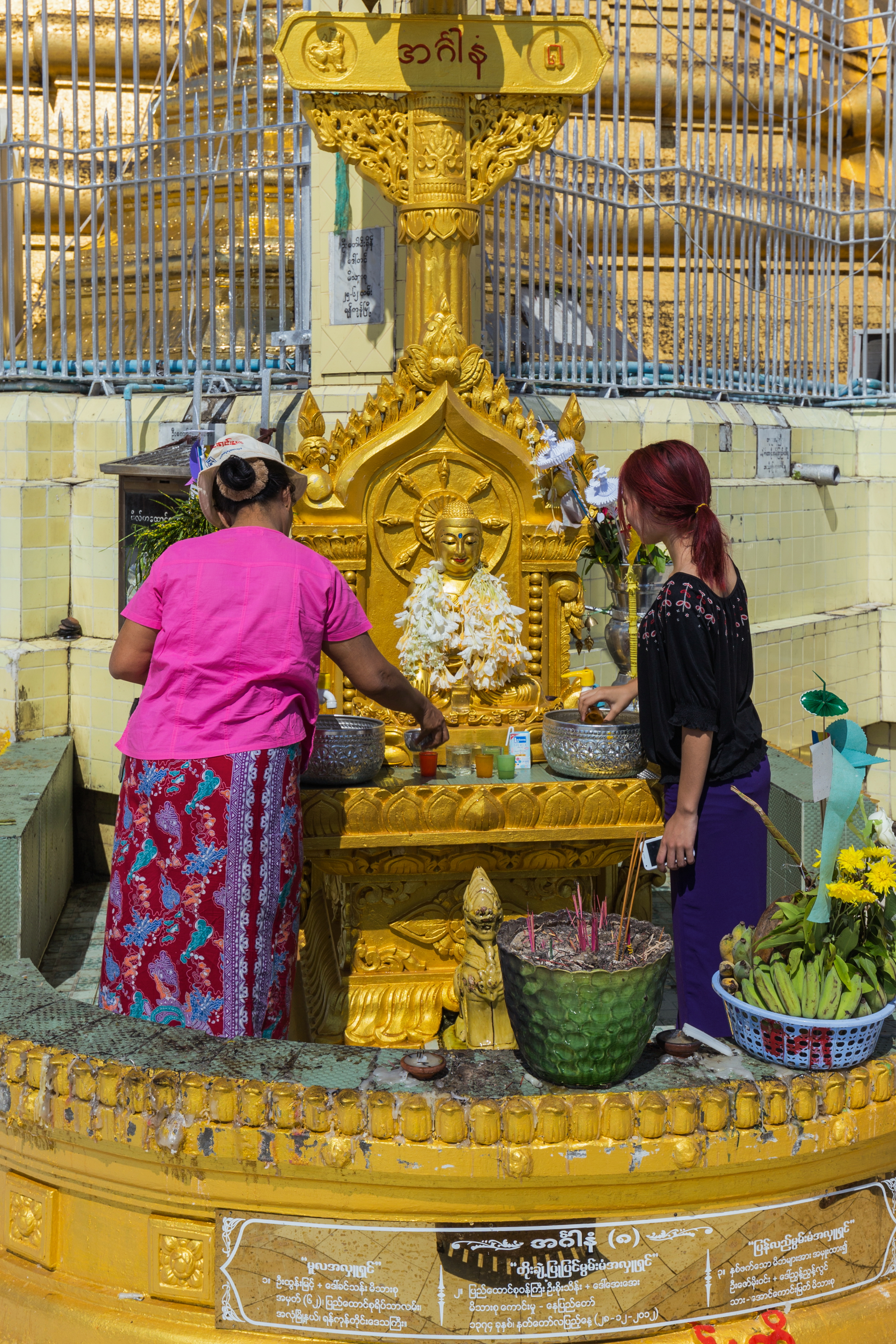
People pouring Buddha statue

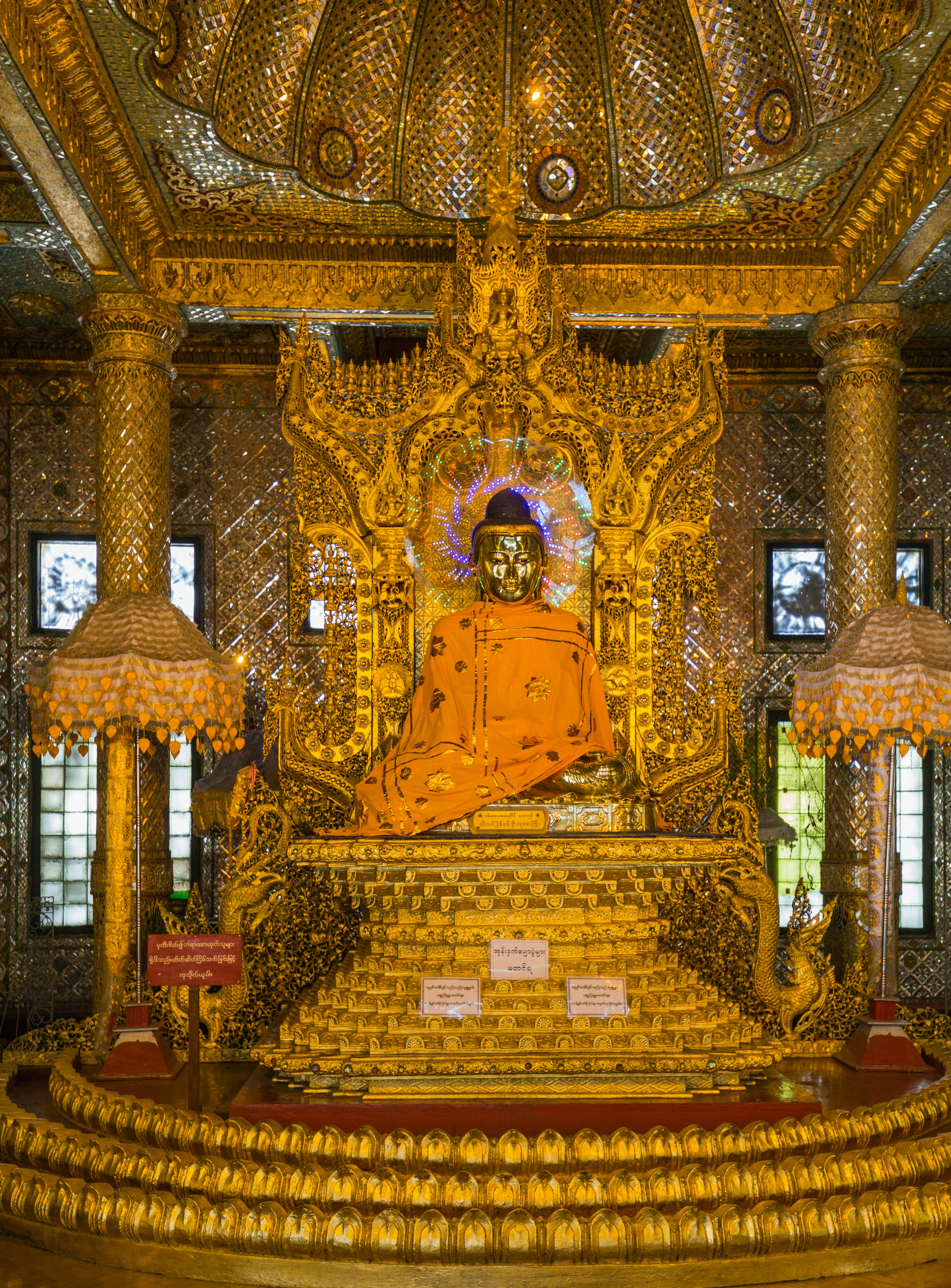
Buddha statue

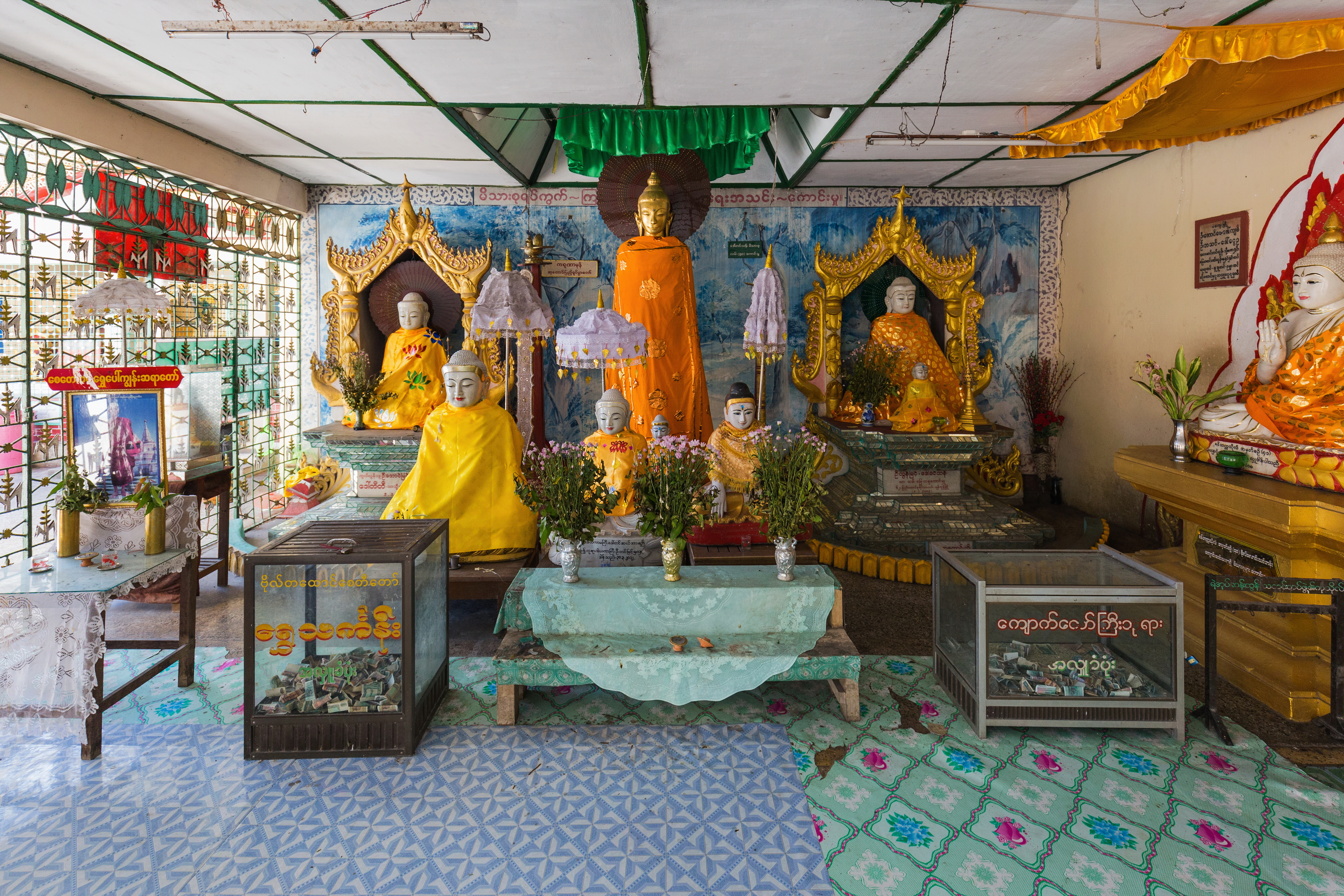
Buddha statues

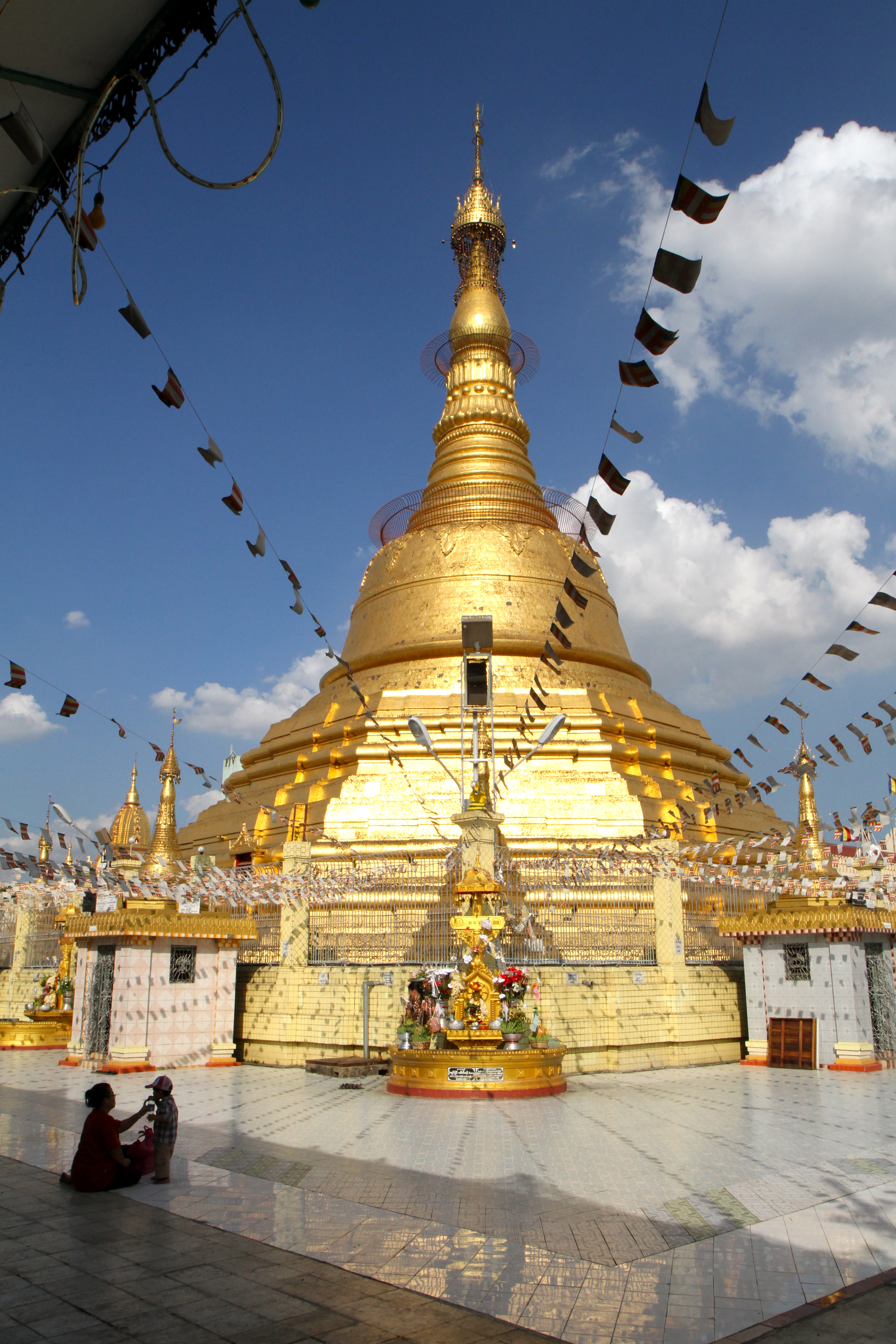
Stupa with flags

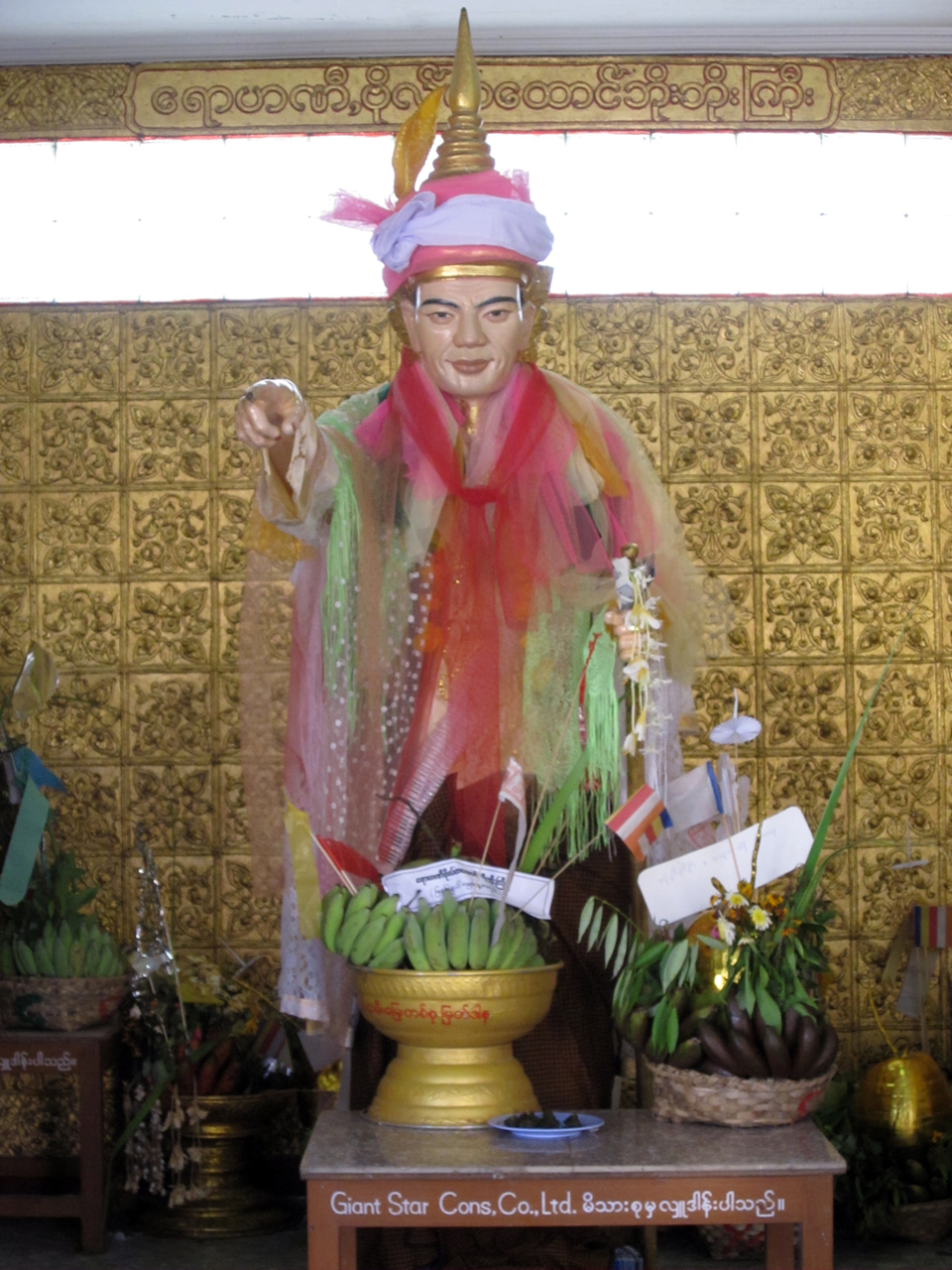
Rohani Bo Bo Gyi is believed to be the guardian spirit of Botahtaung Pagoda

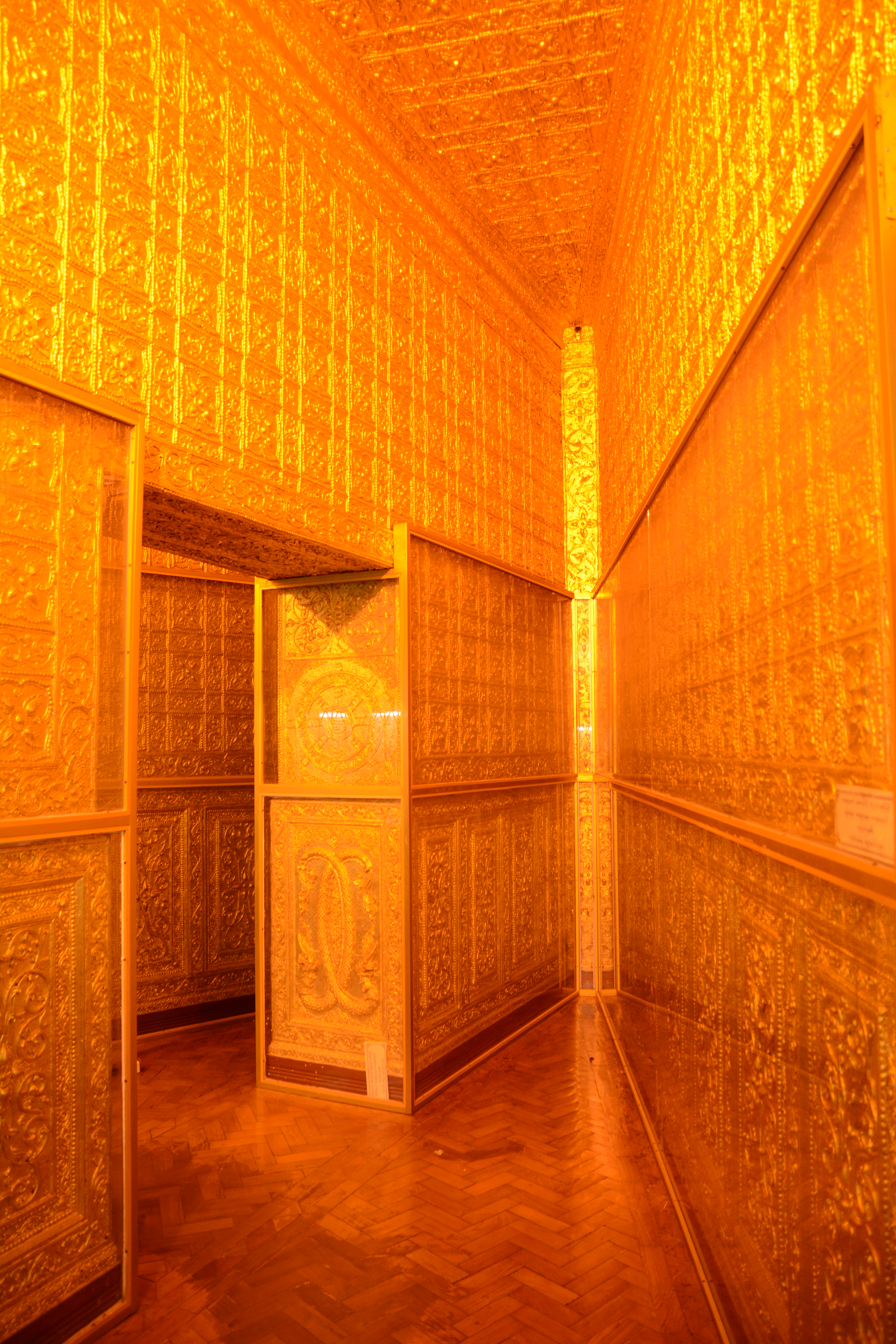
Interior

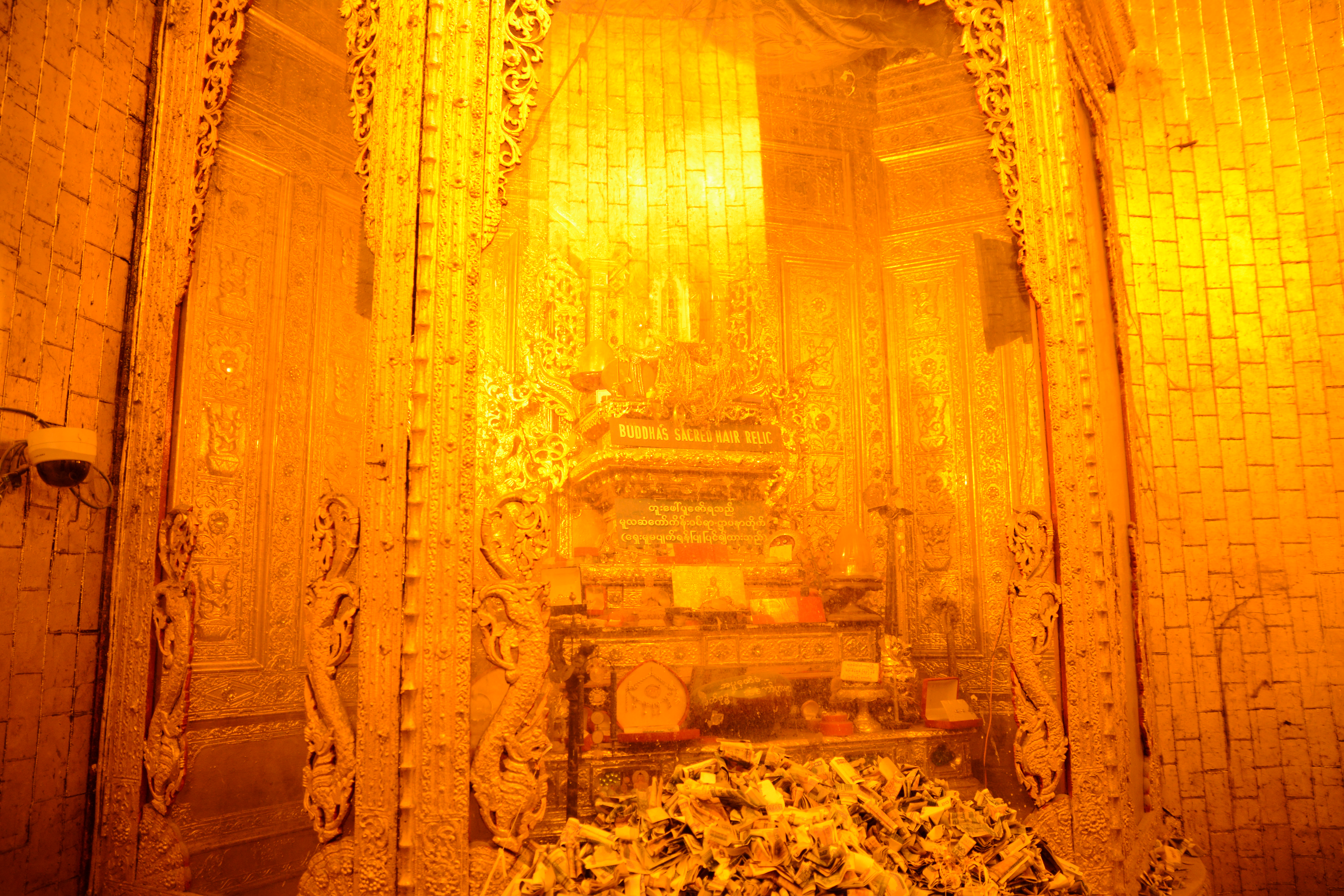
Interior

== See also ==
- Cetiya
- Burmese pagoda
- Shwedagon Pagoda
- Kaba Aye Pagoda
- Sule Pagoda
- Maha Wizaya Pagoda
- Mya Nan Nwe
