= Mya Nan Nwe =

Burmese and Thai woman and goddess

- As the dragon guarding the pagoda
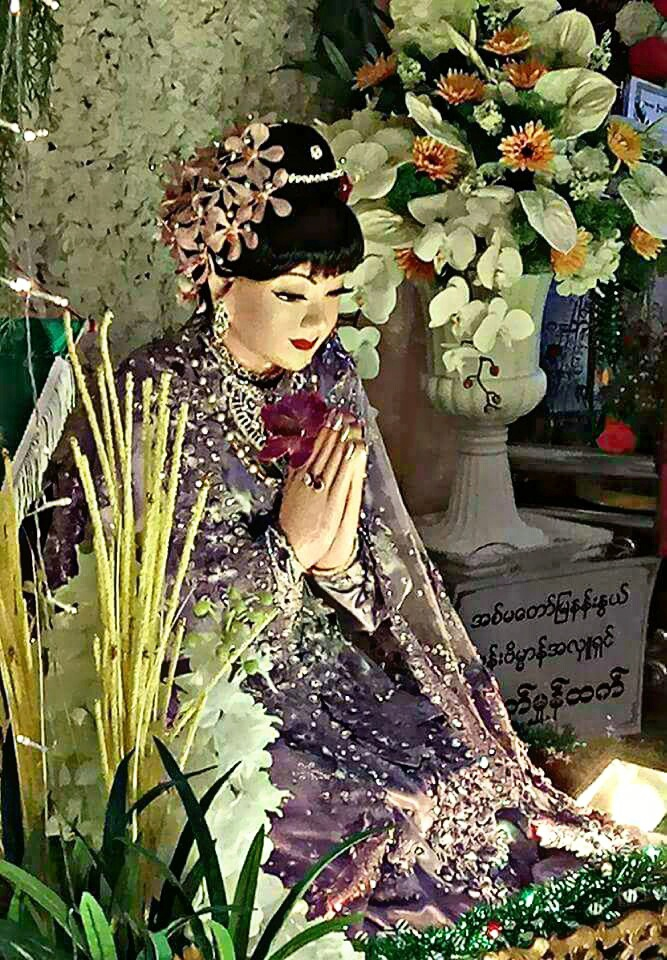
- Other names: Ma Nan
- Burmese: မြနန်းနွယ်
- Abode: Botataung Pagoda

Genealogy
- Born: 22 December 1897; Mogok, British Burma
- Died: February 1956 (aged 49–50); Mogok, Burma
- Parents: Chan Thar (father); Nann Kham (mother)

Mya Nan Nwe (Burmese: မြနန်းနွယ်; Thai: เมียะนานหน่วย, lit. 'angel of whispers'), also known as Thaiknanshin (သိုက်နန်းရှင်, lit. "keeper of the treasure trove") or more popularly known among Thai people as Amadaw Mya (Thai: อะมาดอว์เมียะ) is a prominent Burmese nat. She was known to be a dragon guarding the Botahtaung Pagoda and an elusive reservoir of wealth beneath the ground.

== Lifetime ==
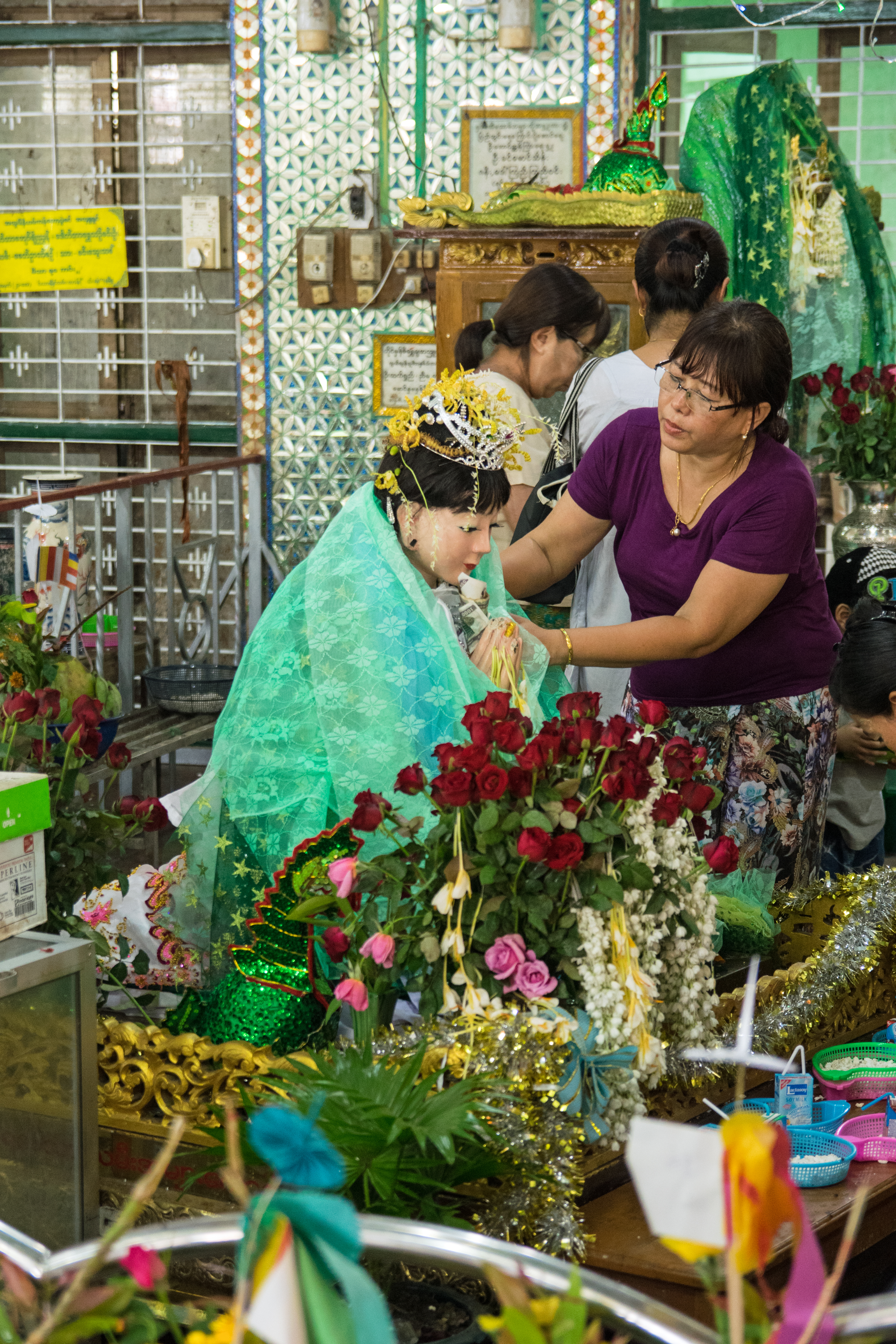
Statue of Mya Nan Nwe

Mya Nan Nwe was born on 22 December 1897 in Mogok, British Burma. She is the descendant of Saopha and the daughter of Chan Thar and Nann Kham. At 15-years-old, she was educated in India and graduated with a B.A. in 1926. From Mogok, dignitaries wanted to marry her, but she refused. She did not eat meat from an early age. In 1942, in her dream, an old man in white robes told her that she should move to Yangon as a missionary. So, she moved to Botataung Pagoda Road, Yangon, and visited the Botataung Pagoda daily. She was called Princess of Green as she wore green clothes. She contributed to religious works, including the rebuilding of the Botahtaung Pagoda after its destruction during World War II.

Some believe that she was the daughter of a nāga.

== Deification ==
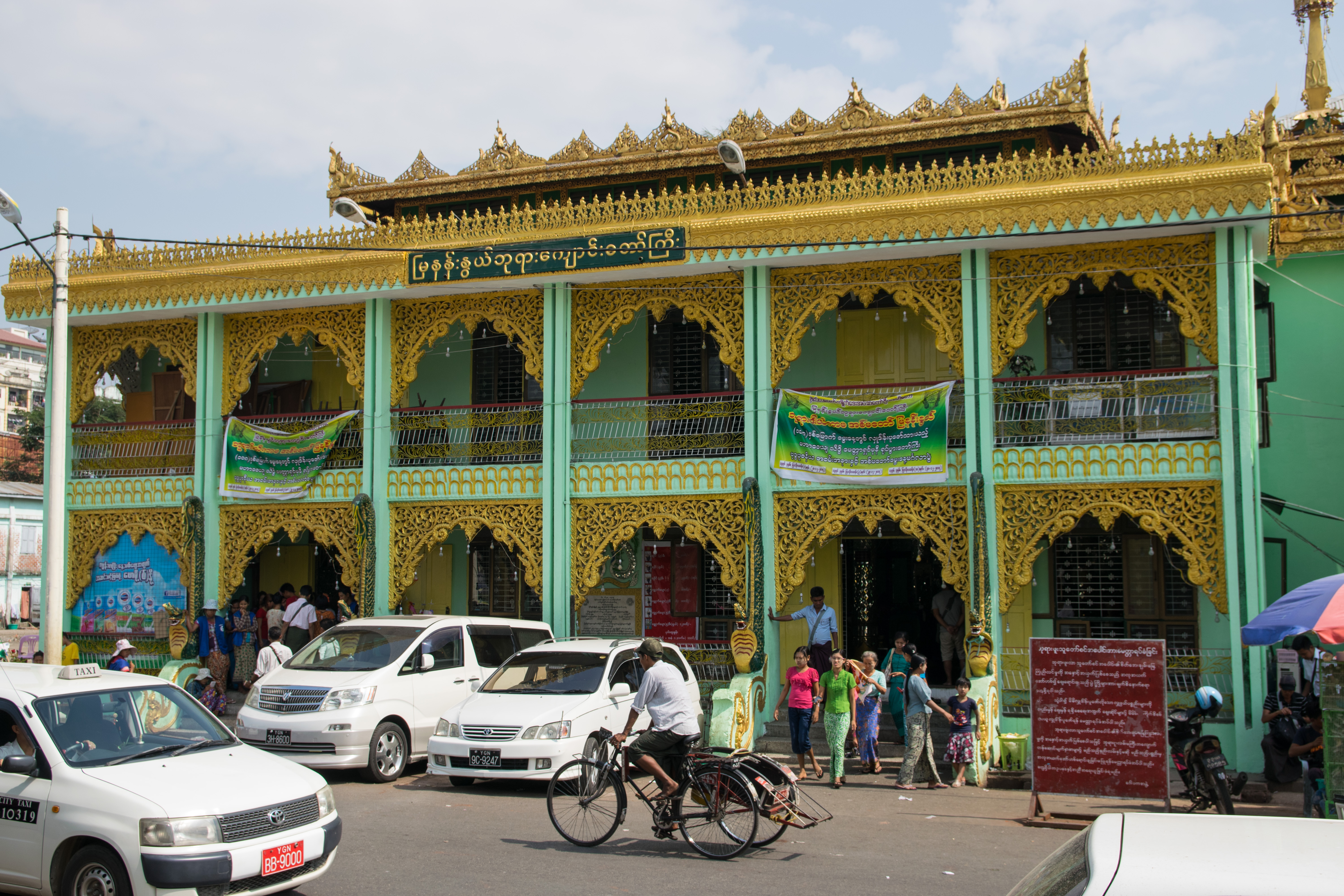
Shrine to Mya Nan Nwe, opposite Botataung Pagoda

Mya Nan Nwe died in Mogok in February 1956 due to complications related to long-term asthma. After she died in 1957, Mya Nan Nwe became a revered figure in her own right. In 1990, her shrine was erected inside the Botahtaung Pagoda, and from that point on, she was worshipped as Mya Nan Nwe Dewi (Goddess), a nat with the power to grant the wishes of those who appealed to her for help. She was known to be a nāga who guards the pagoda. Hundreds of people come to this place to donate offerings and also to ask for her blessing.

== Shrine ==
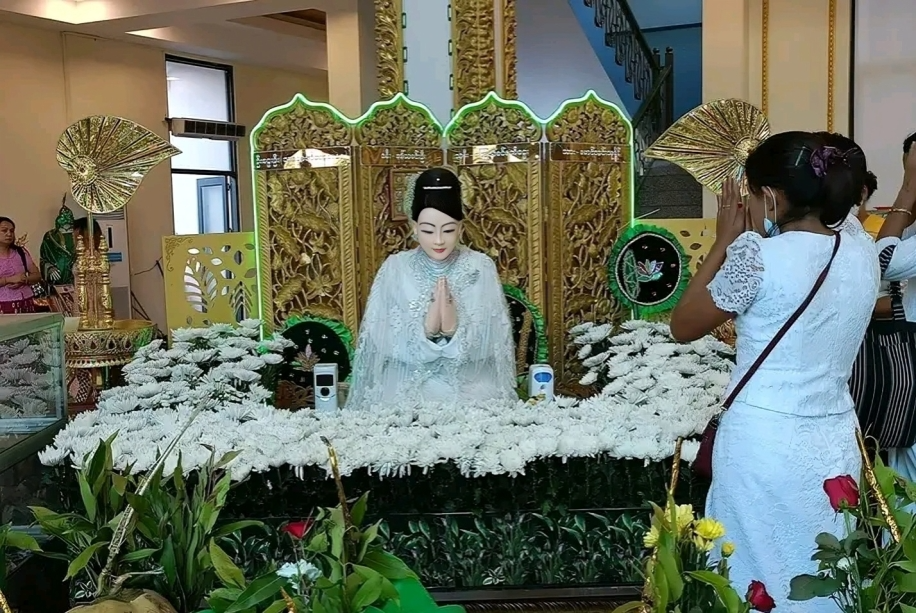
Statute of Mya Nan Nwe being worshipped in Yangon

The shrine attracts 700 worshippers per day, and between 1,000 and 3,000 worshippers on weekends, including many Thai devotees. She gained popularity in Thailand through a Thai television program that featured her biography.

The military dictator Than Shwe had ordered her statue to be handcuffed every night during his rule. It is said that she appeared in the dictator's dream, asking him to stop oppressing the citizens of Myanmar. The dictator was notably highly superstitious and saw this as a bad omen, hence ordering her statue in the shrine to be handcuffed at night.

== See also ==
- Botataung Pagoda
