= Wat Hong Rattanaram =

Buddhist temple in Bangkok, Thailand

Coordinates: 13°44′22″N 100°29′17″E

Wat Hong Rattanaram Ratchaworawihan
- วัดหงส์รัตนารามราชวรวิหาร
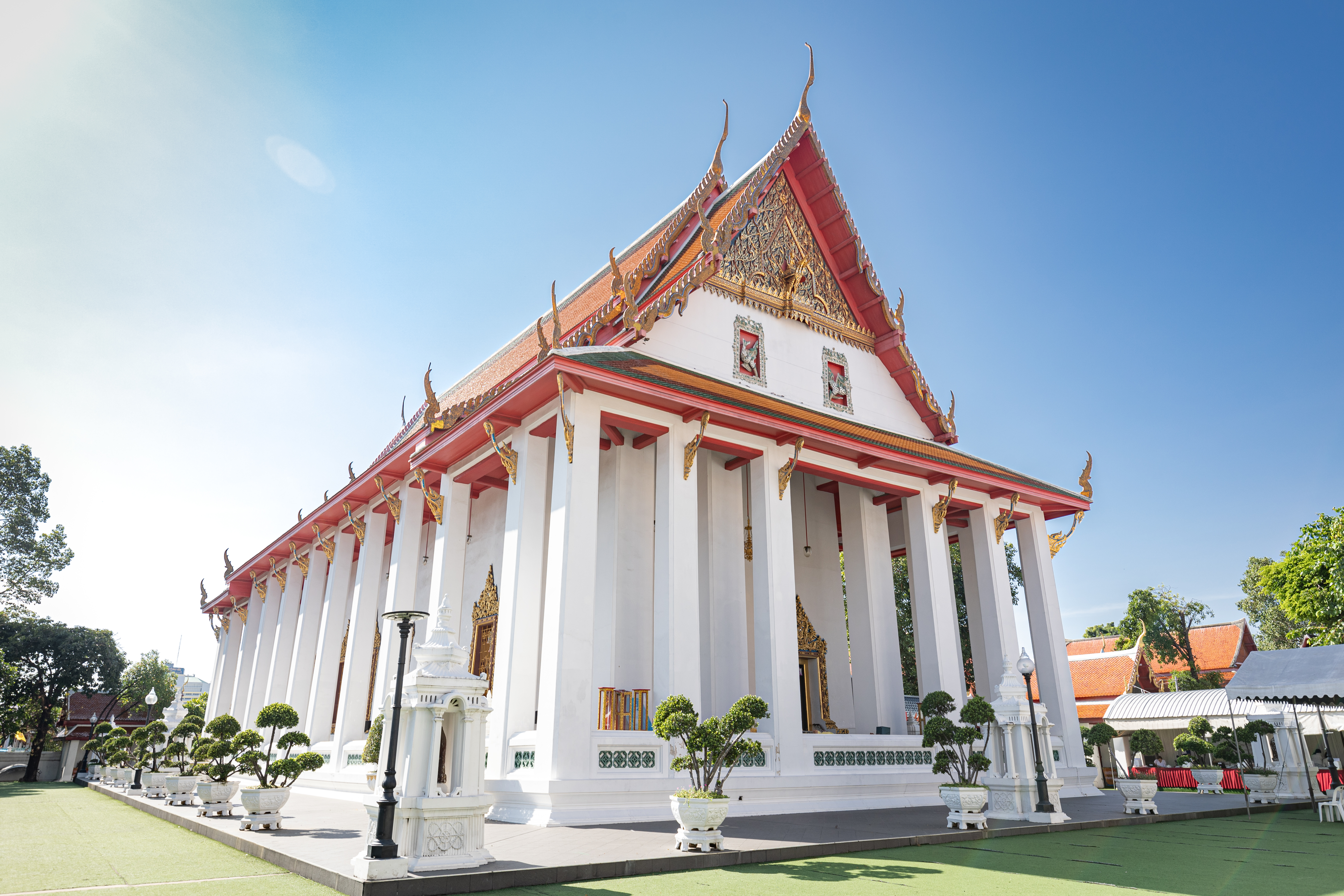
- Ordination hall of the temple

- Location within Thailand

Religion
- Affiliation: Buddhism
- Sect: Theravāda, Mahā Nikāya
- Region: Central

Location
- Location: 72 Soi Wang Derm 2, Wang Derm Rd, Wat Arun, Bangkok Yai, Bangkok
- Country: Thailand
- Interactive map of Wat Hong Rattanaram Ratchaworawihan

Architecture
- Type: Wat
- Style: Thai mixed European
- Founder: Chao Sua Hong

Wat Hong Rattanaram Ratchaworawihan, or just called Wat Hong Rattanaram (Thai: วัดหงส์รัตนารามราชวรวิหาร, วัดหงส์รัตนาราม) is an ancient Thai Buddhist temple located in Bangkok rim the Khlong Bangkok Yai canal. It is classified as the second rank of royal temple and can be considered a temple of Prince Pinklao.

This temple built since late Ayutthaya period by wealthy Chinese named Hong, who was donated funds to build a temple on the banks of the Khlong Bangkok Yai. Hence the names Wat Hong, Wat Chao Sua Hong or Wat Chao Khrua Hong after the benefactor.

After the fall of Ayutthaya in 1767, King Taksin decided to locate his new capital further away from Burma, he chose this area in Thonburi between two canals Bangkok Yai and Bangkok Noi.

He built his palace, Wang Derm near the old fort (Wichai Prasit Fort) and chose to worship at Wat Hong just 500 m (1,640 ft) to the south. During his reign, he also has patronized this temple in the royal support since it was a religious educational centre.

Until the reign of King Nangklao (Rama III) there was a major restoration of the temple. Within the ordination hall, the principal Buddha statue was enshrined, named "Phra Saen", which is a bronze Buddha statue in the Lan Xang art style. Its history was enshrined at one temple in Chiang Taeng (Steung Treng). Later, King Mongkut (Rama IV) invoke along with Emerald Buddha and enshrined it in this temple. Phra Sean is considered to be a very sacred Buddha statue, there are many people worshiping and vowing. When those who had vowed had achieved the desired results often preferred to make a votive offering on sticky rice, pla ra (pickled fish) and boiled eggs.

The ordination hall has beautiful architecture with ornate frames for the doors and windows and sculptured doors. The murals of the hall adorn all four walls inside depict the Mahanipata Jataka (Ten Great Birth Stories of the Buddha), tales of the ten previous lives of Buddha.

The sermon hall and where Buddha statues are enshrined. The main Buddha statue in this hall is one of gold from the late Sukhothai period. Originally it was encased in cement, when cement was cracked in the year 1957, it was found that it was actually a golden Buddha statue. Believe that it is a contemporary Buddha statue to the golden Buddha statue of Wat Traimit in Chainatown.

The temple there is a shrine in honour of King Taksin located just outside the temple near the Khlong Bangkok Yai. This was built by members of the community in gratitude for the king’s restoration of the temple. As well as a sacred pool that is believed to be a source of holy water for those who worship to bring water to bath or drink.

In the year 1915, the land of the temple was also the location of the Bangkok Yai district office. Before moving to the current location at the Ratchadaphisek road near Tha Phra intersection in year 1988.

Besides, the nearby Itsaraphap MRT station, the extension station of the MRT Blue Line. The main theme of this station is the golden swan, which pays tribute to the majestic Wat Hong Rattanaram and the ceilings and columns of the main terminal are decorated with golden swan iconography. This is because the word "Hong" in Thai means hamsa, a mythical swan according to the beliefs of Thais and Hindus and is also a steed of Brahma.

== Gallery ==
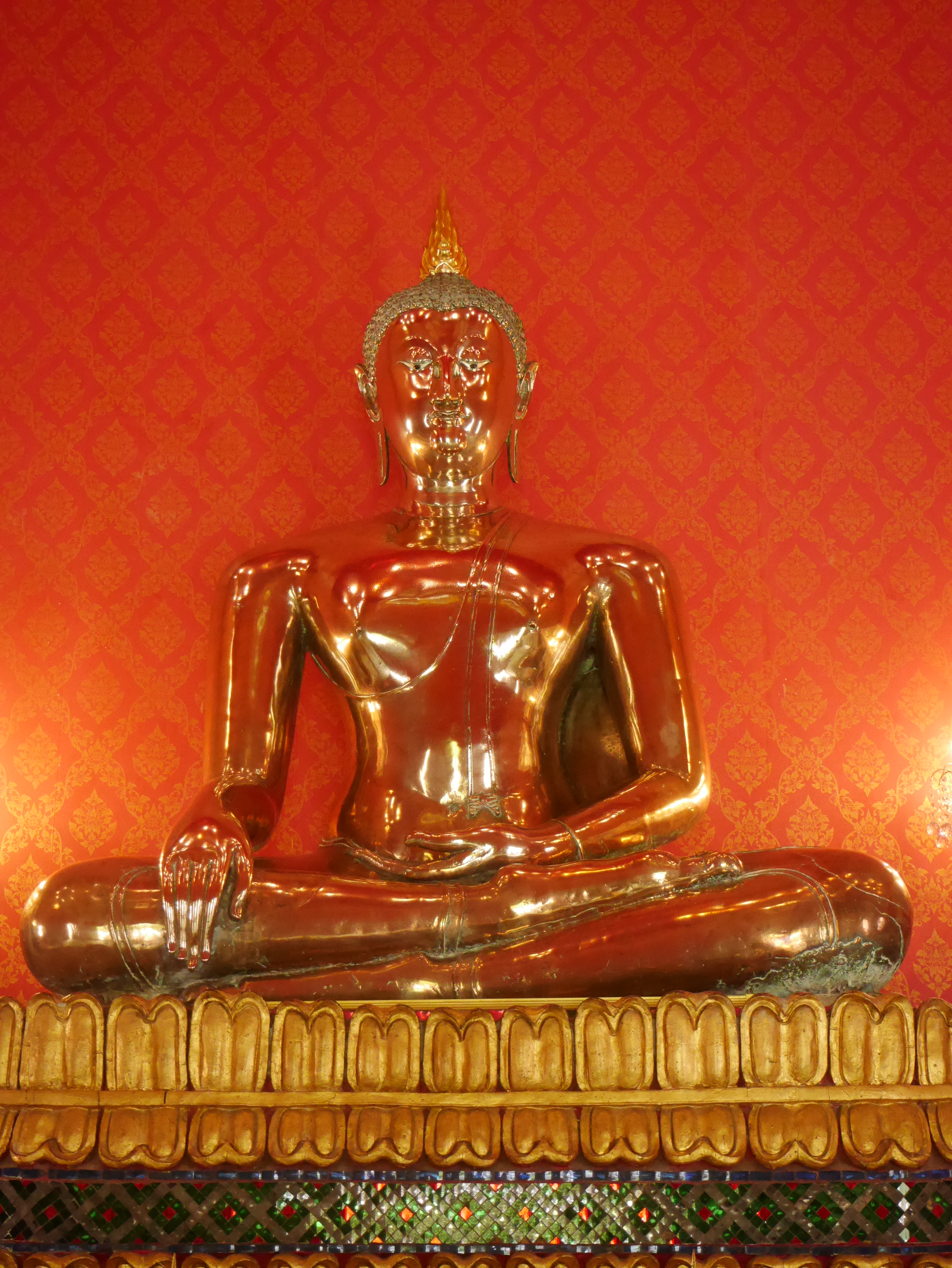
The golden Buddha

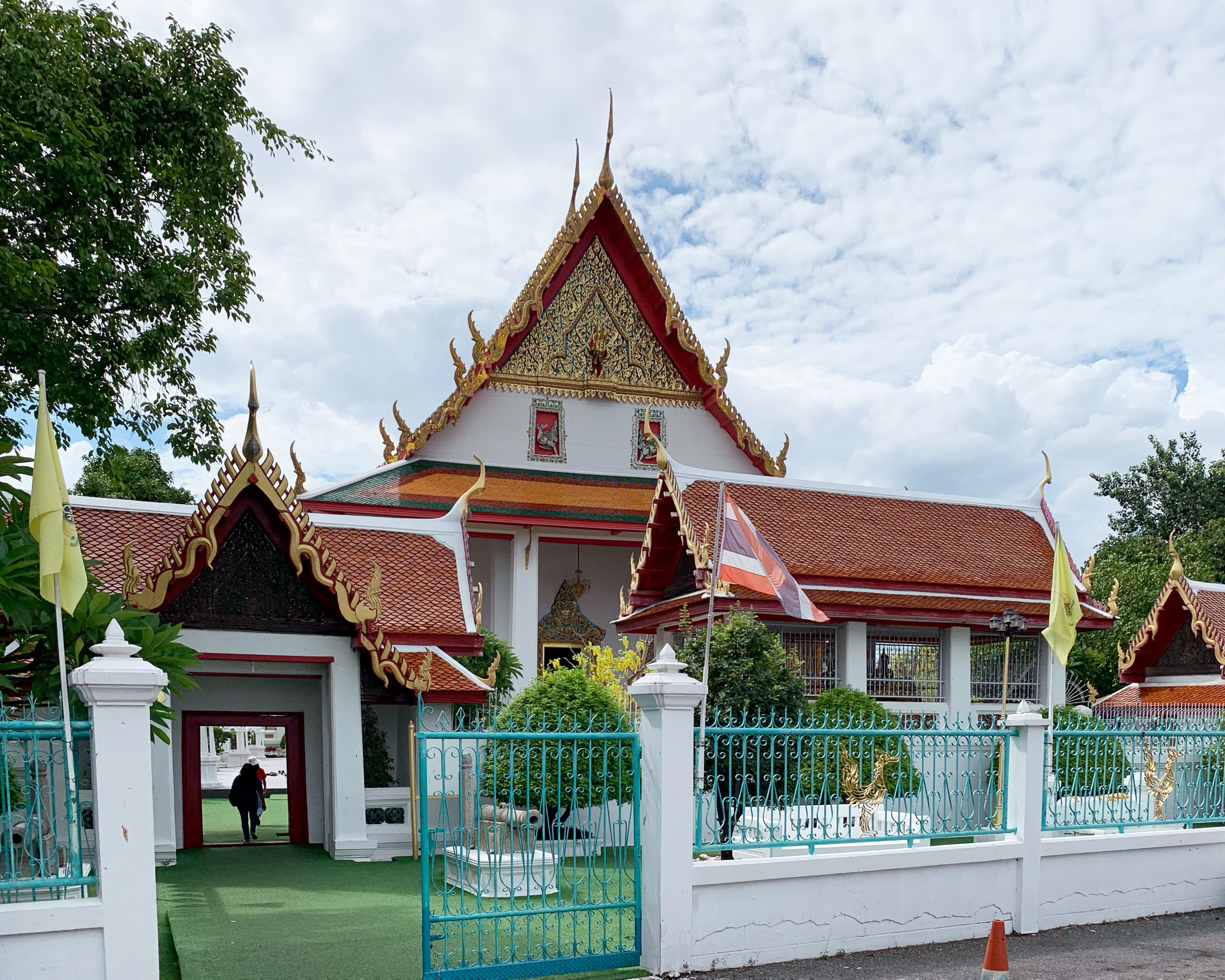
Outside the temple

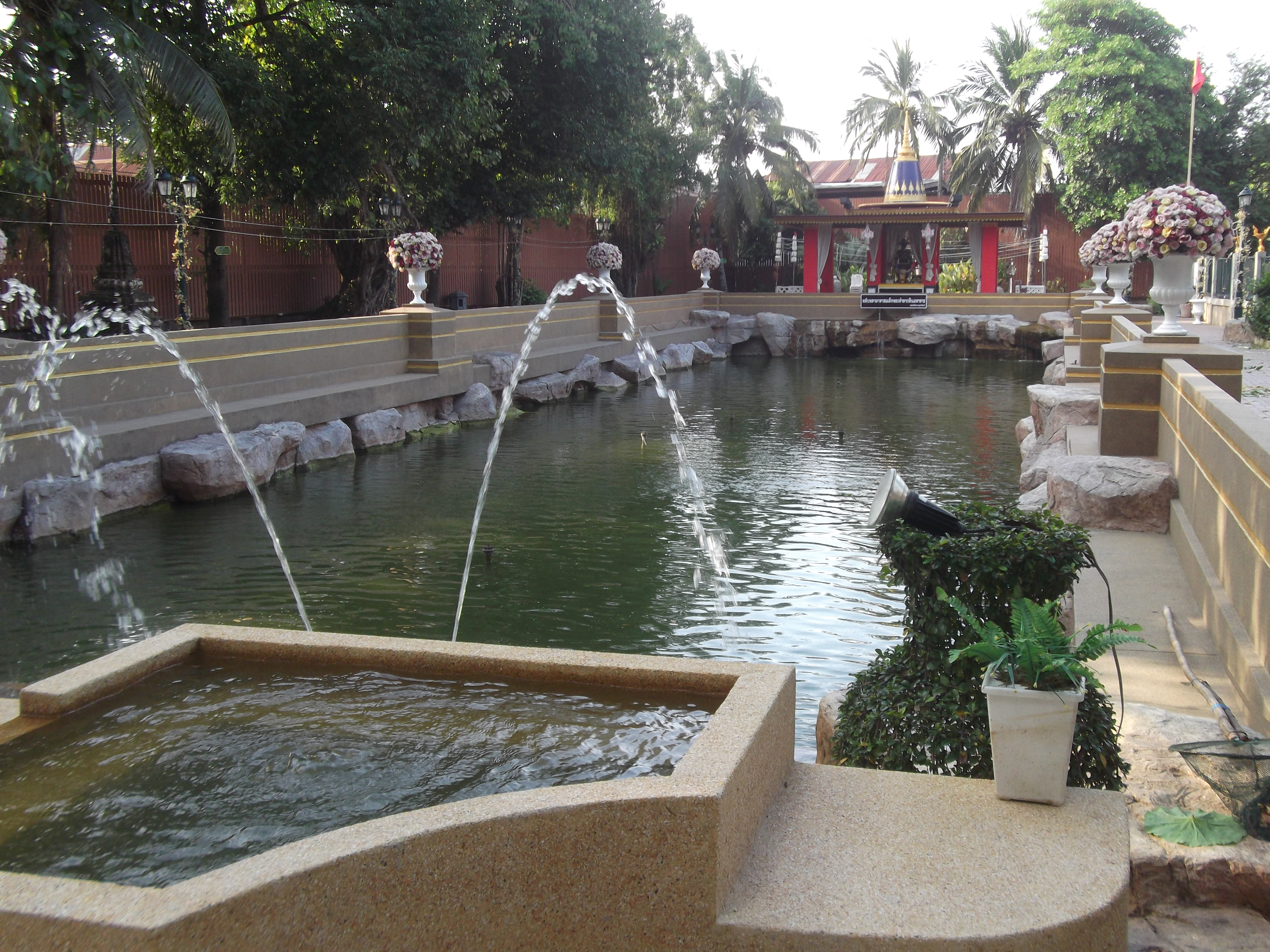
Sacred pool

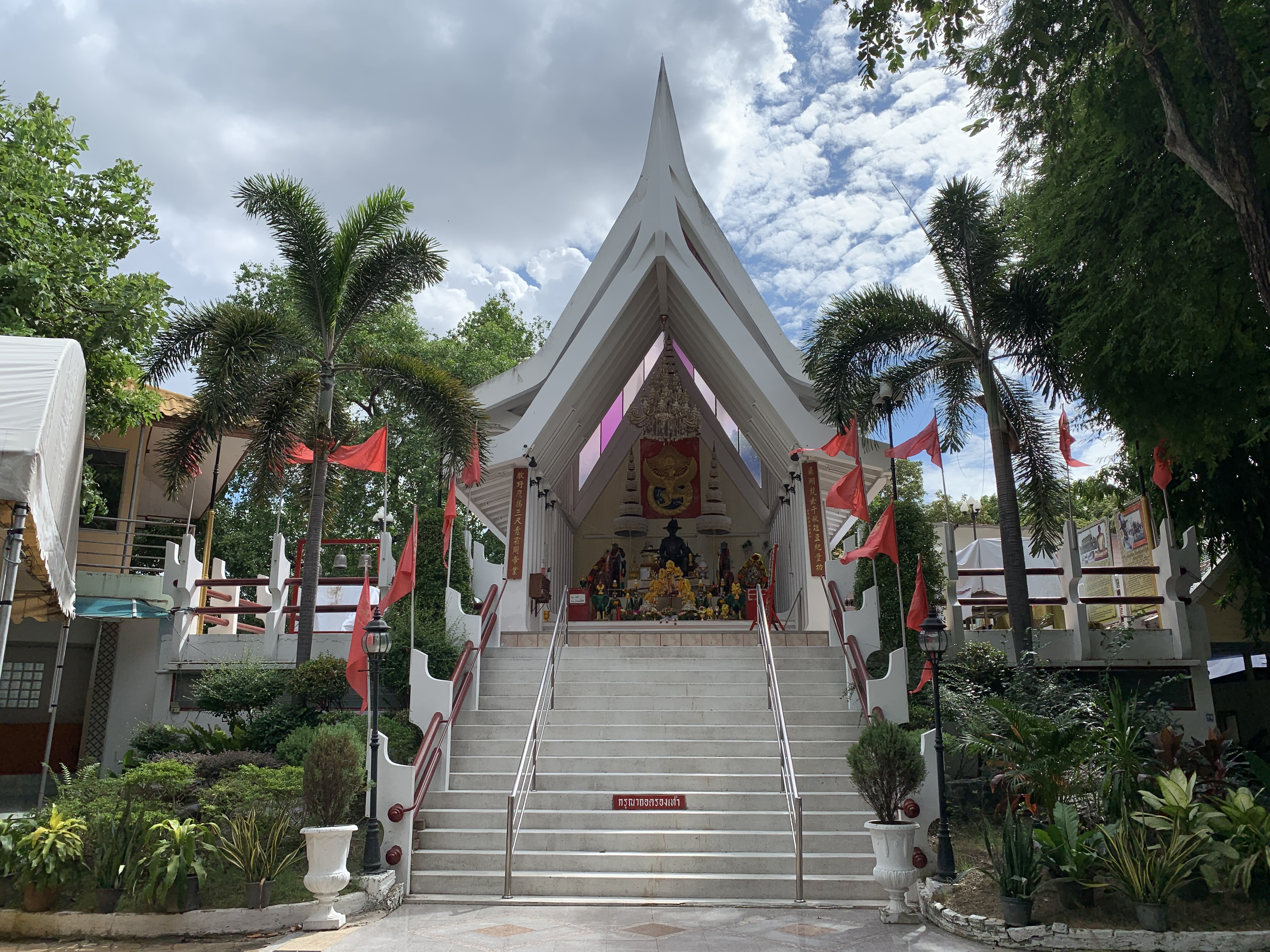
King Taksin shrine

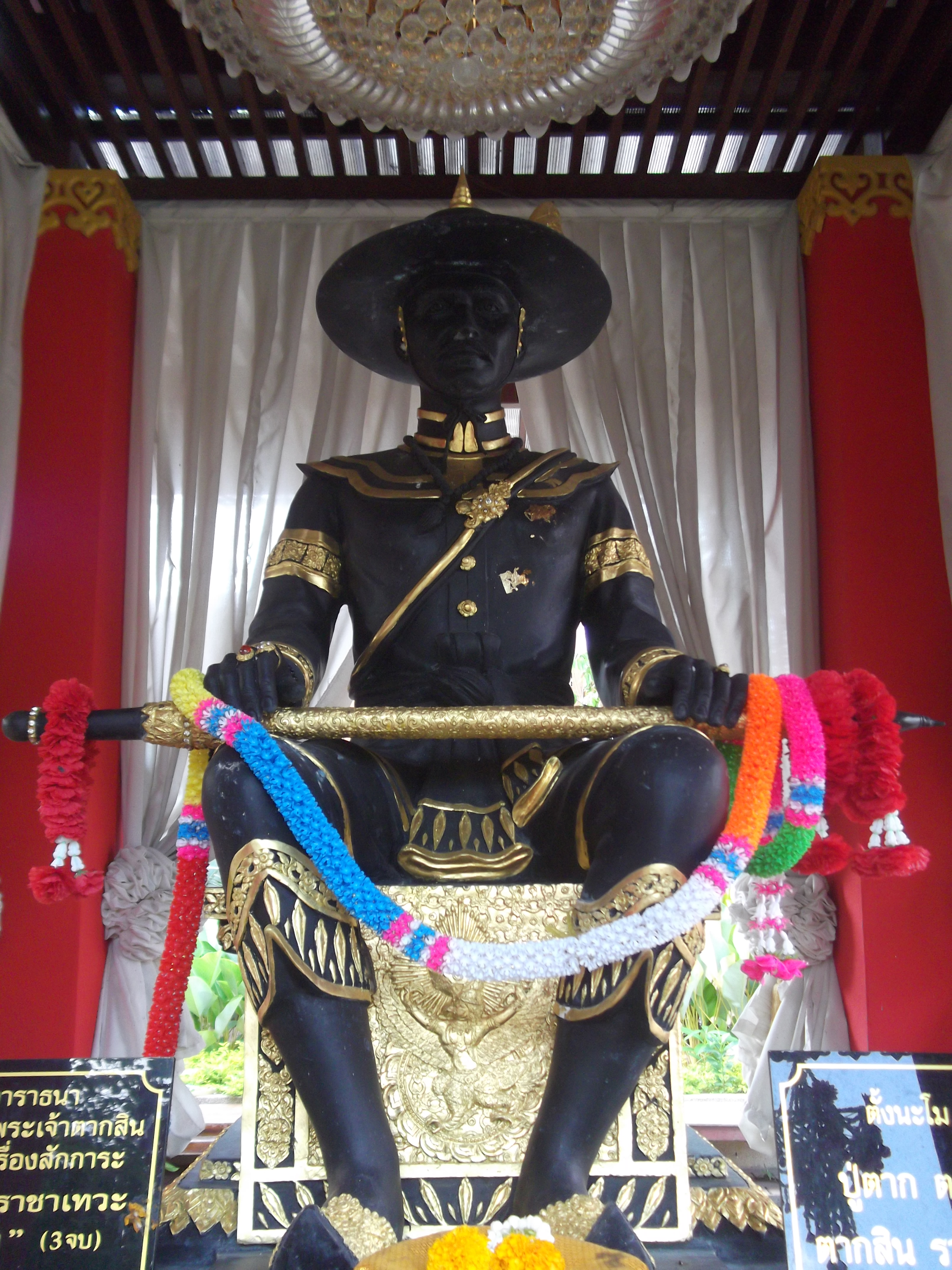
King Taksin statue

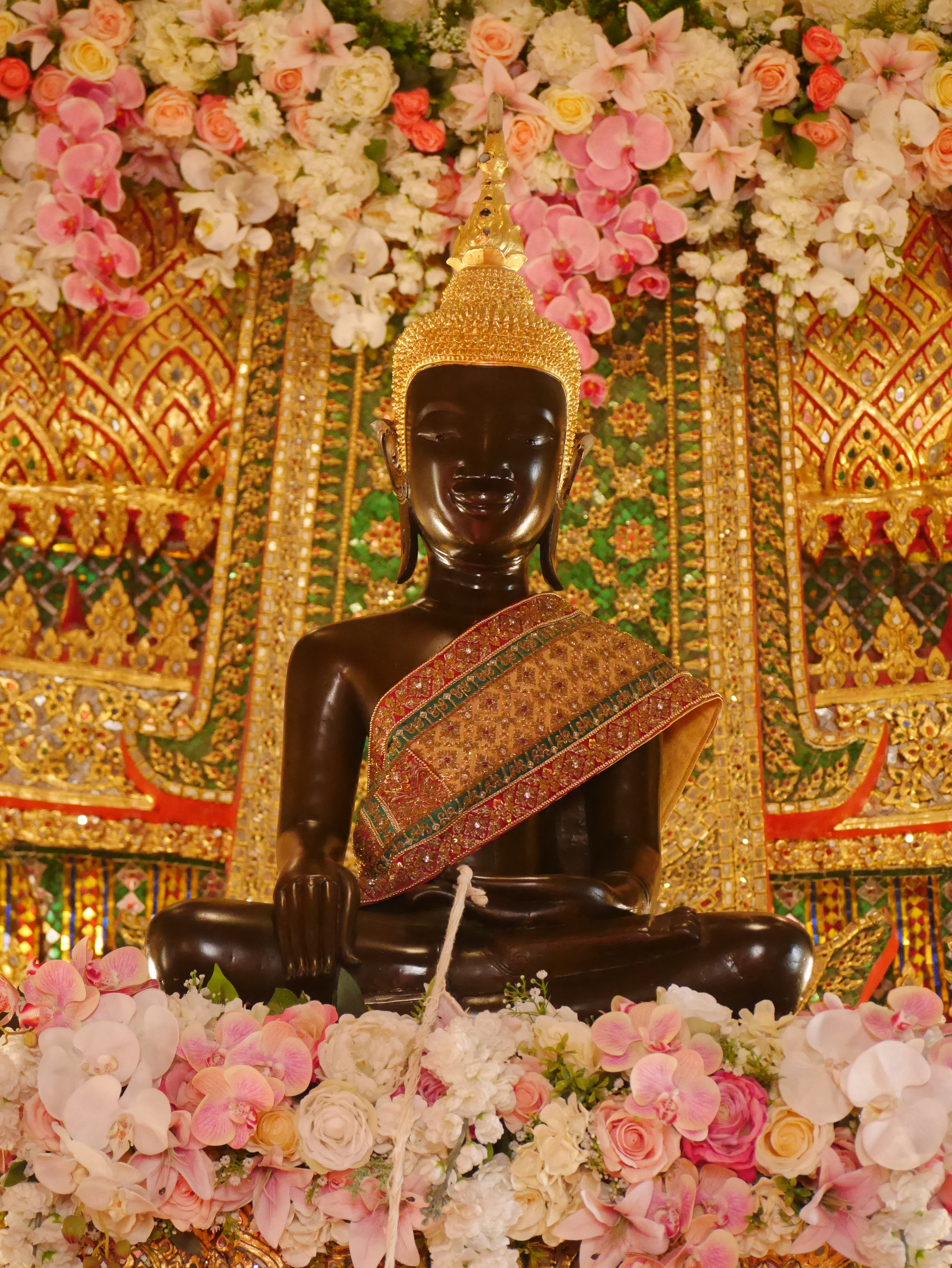
Phra Saen

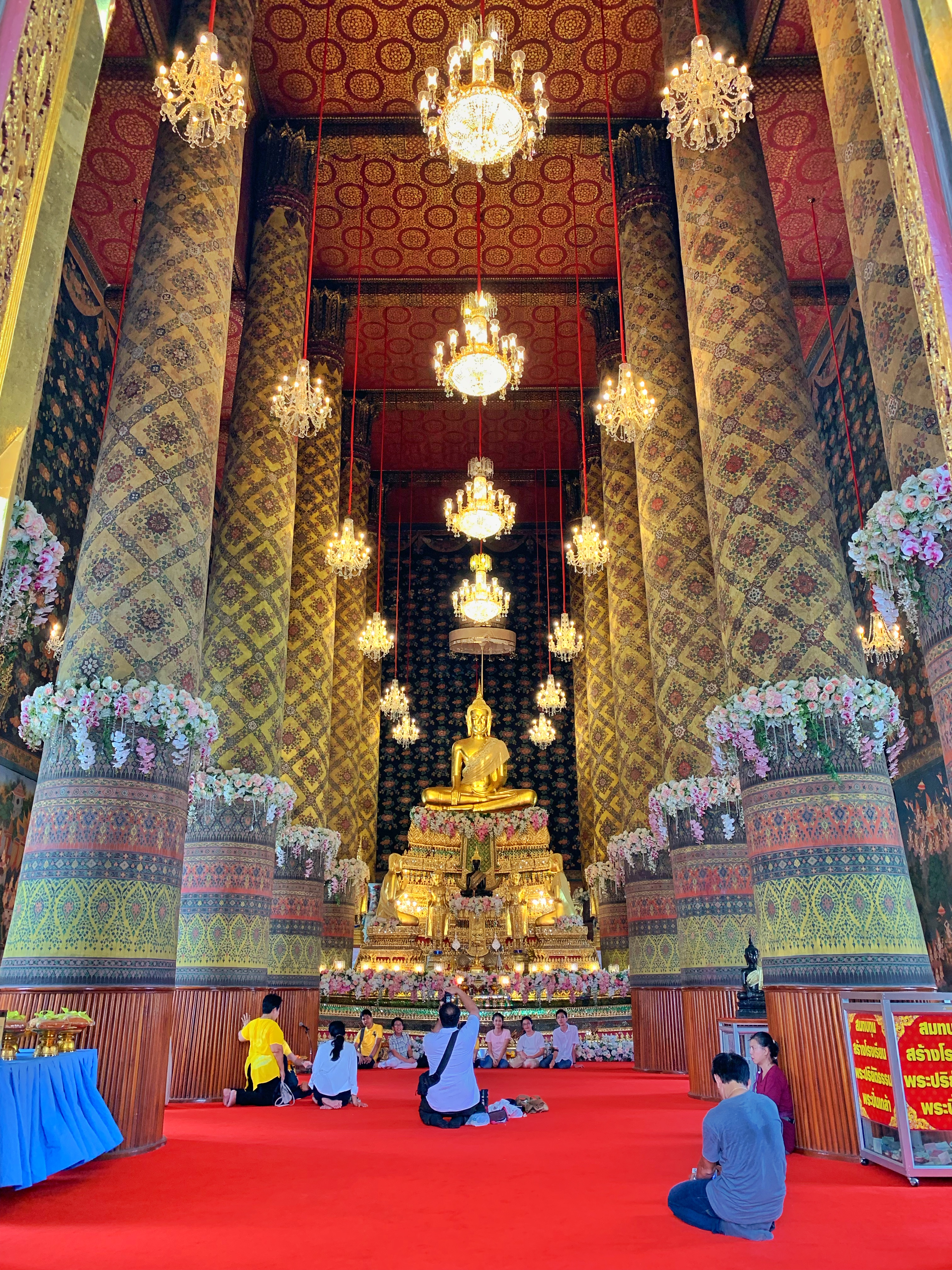
Inside the ordination hall

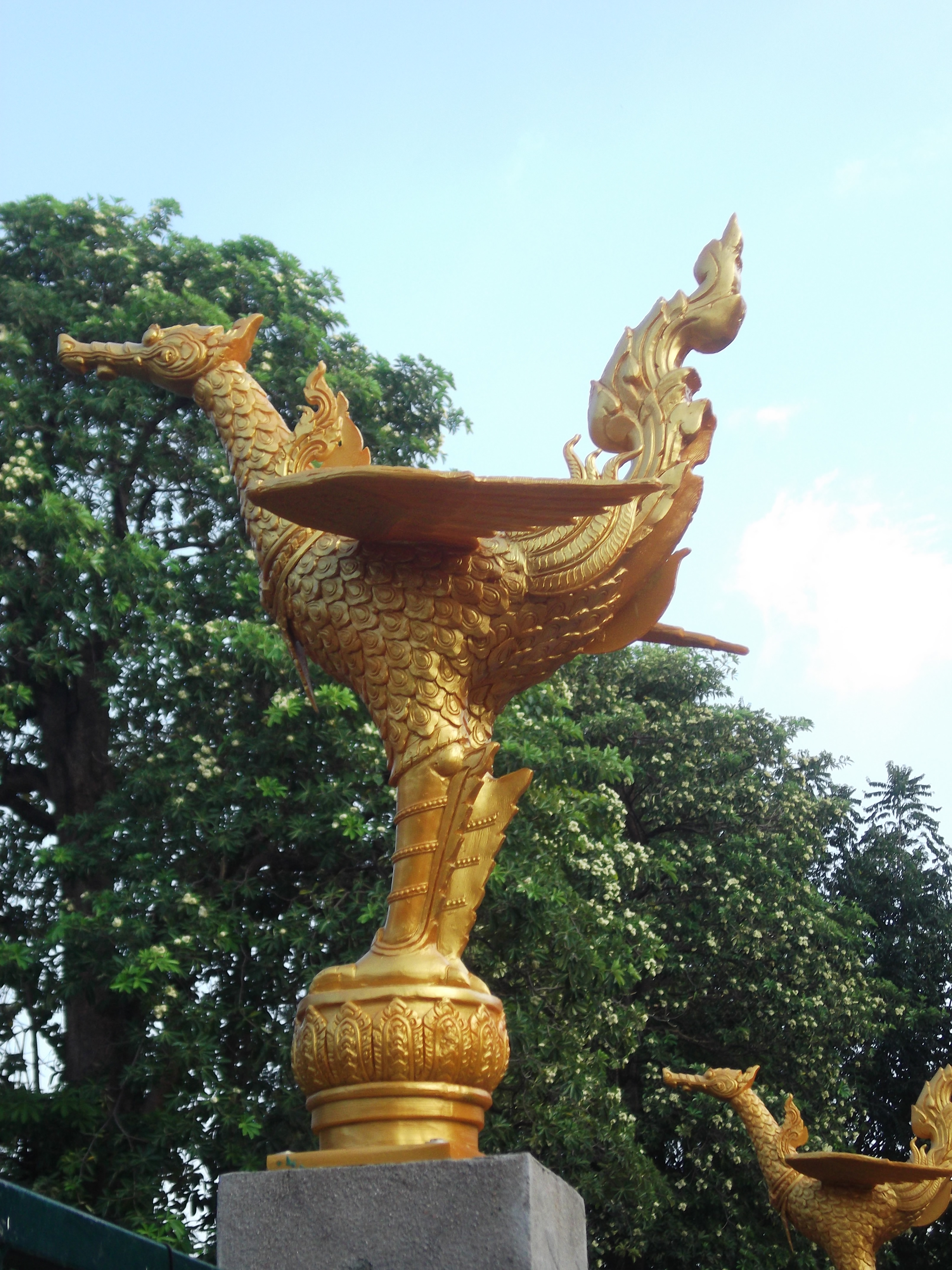
Swan-shaped pole, the origin name of the temple

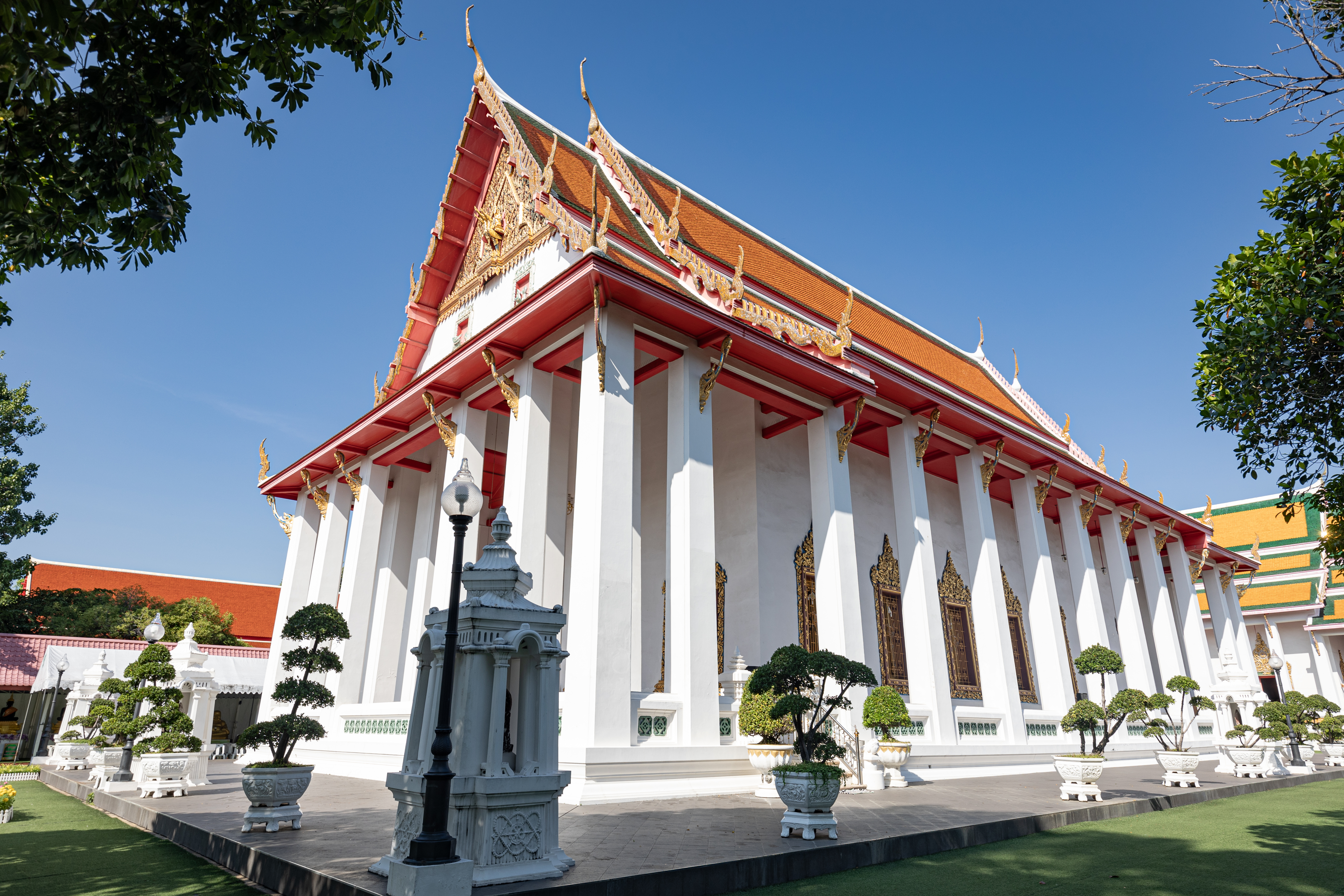
Ordination Hall (Ubosot)

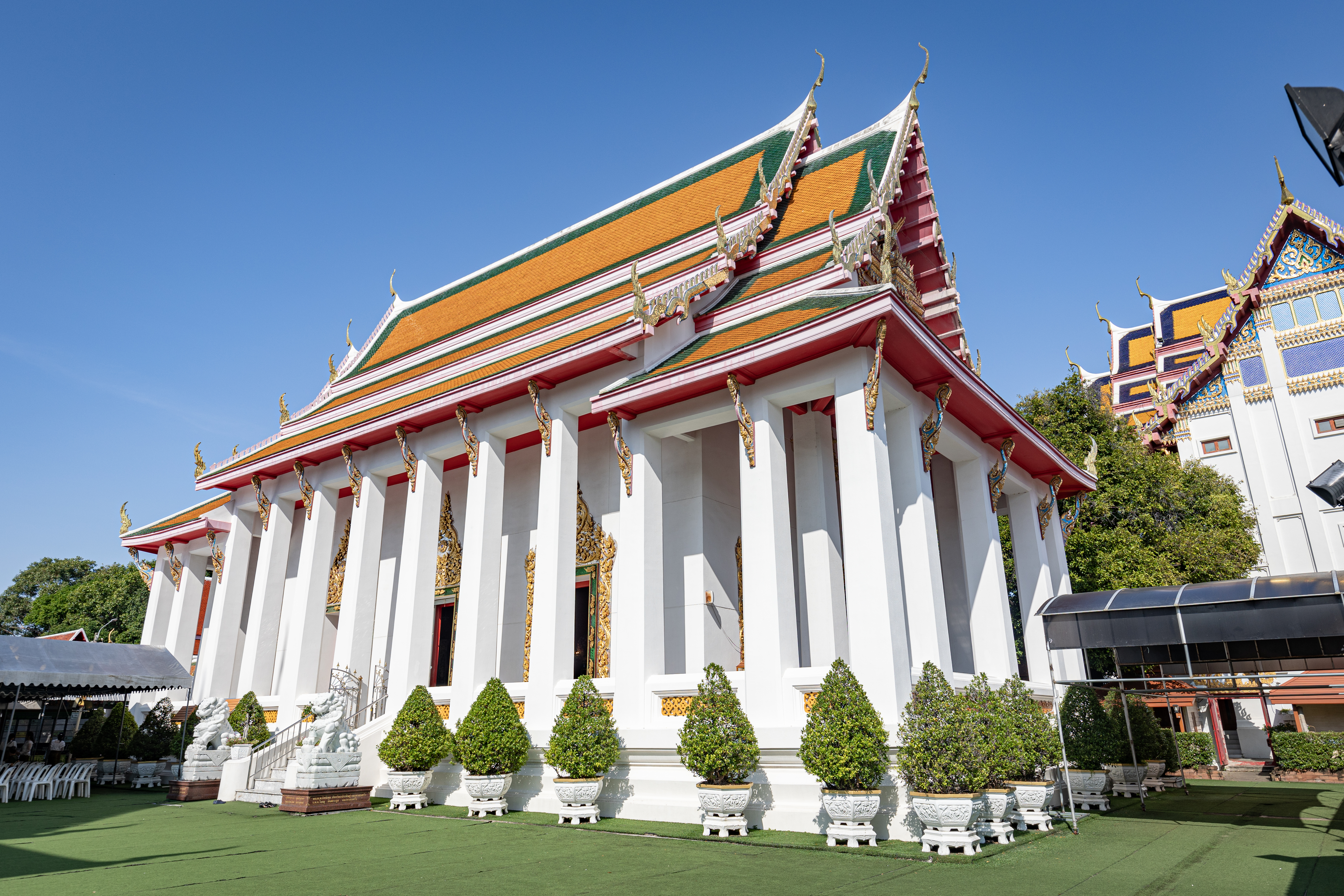
Vihara (Main Hall)

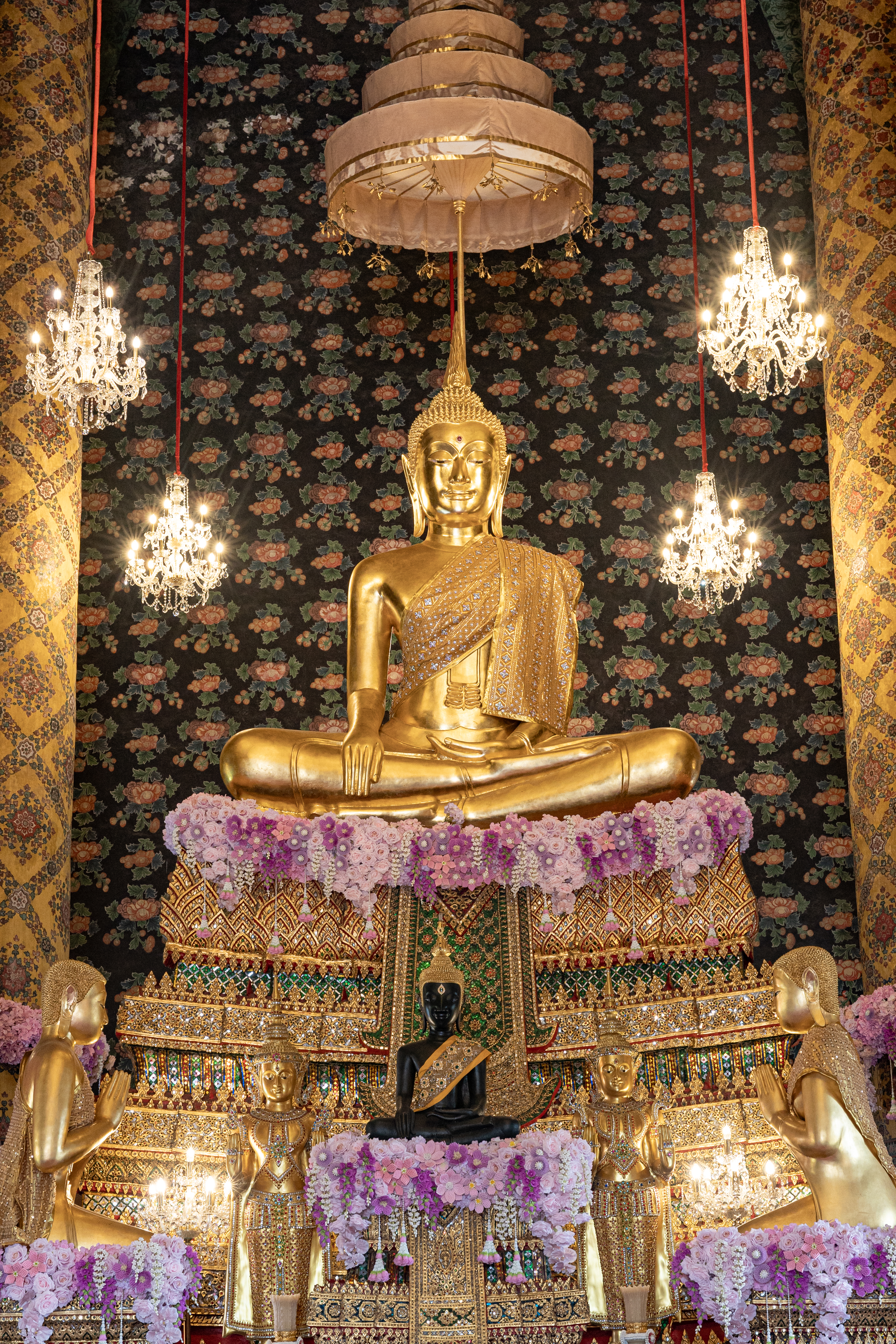
Principal Buddha image in the Ordination Hall

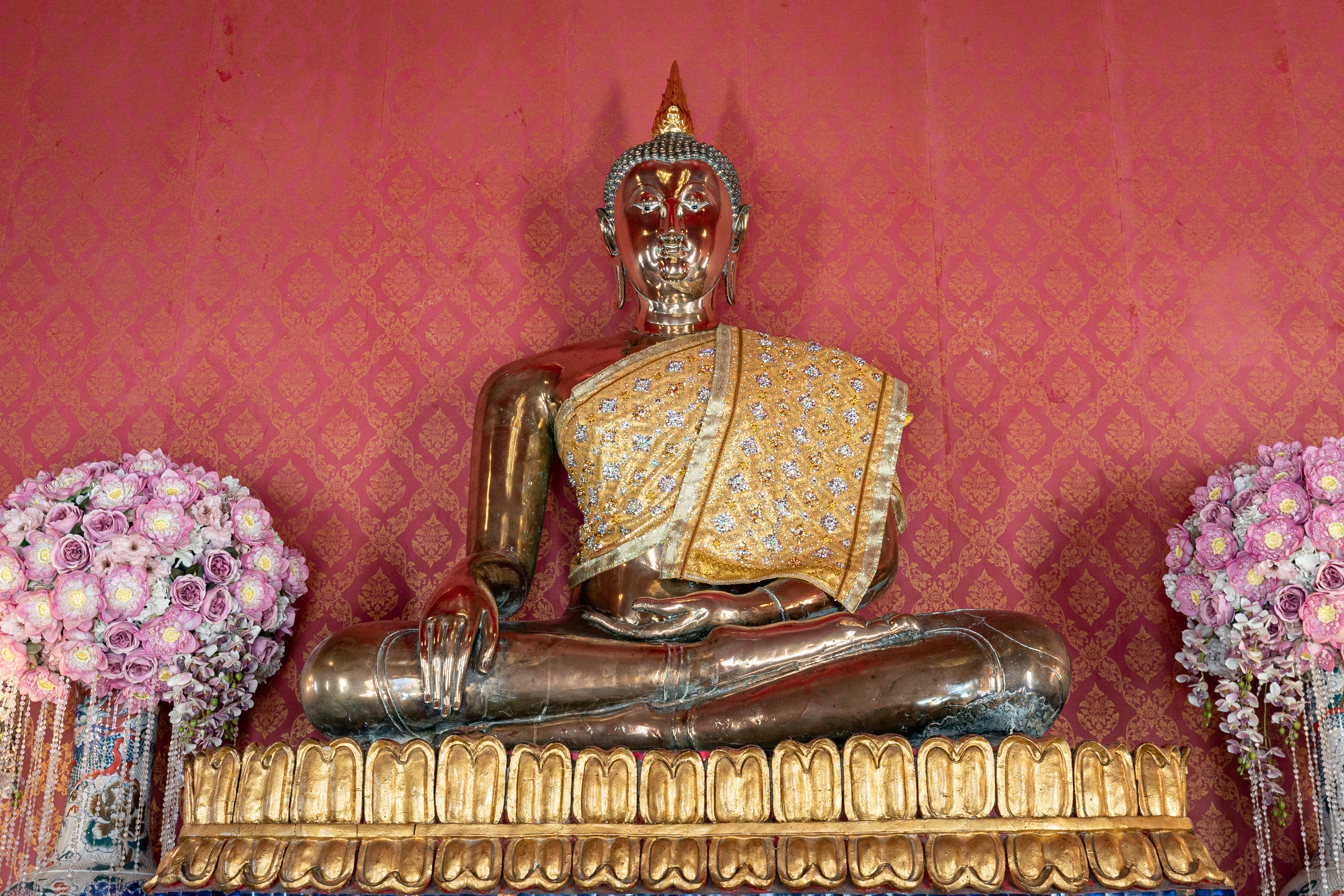
Luang Pho Thongkham, the principal Buddha image in the Vihara

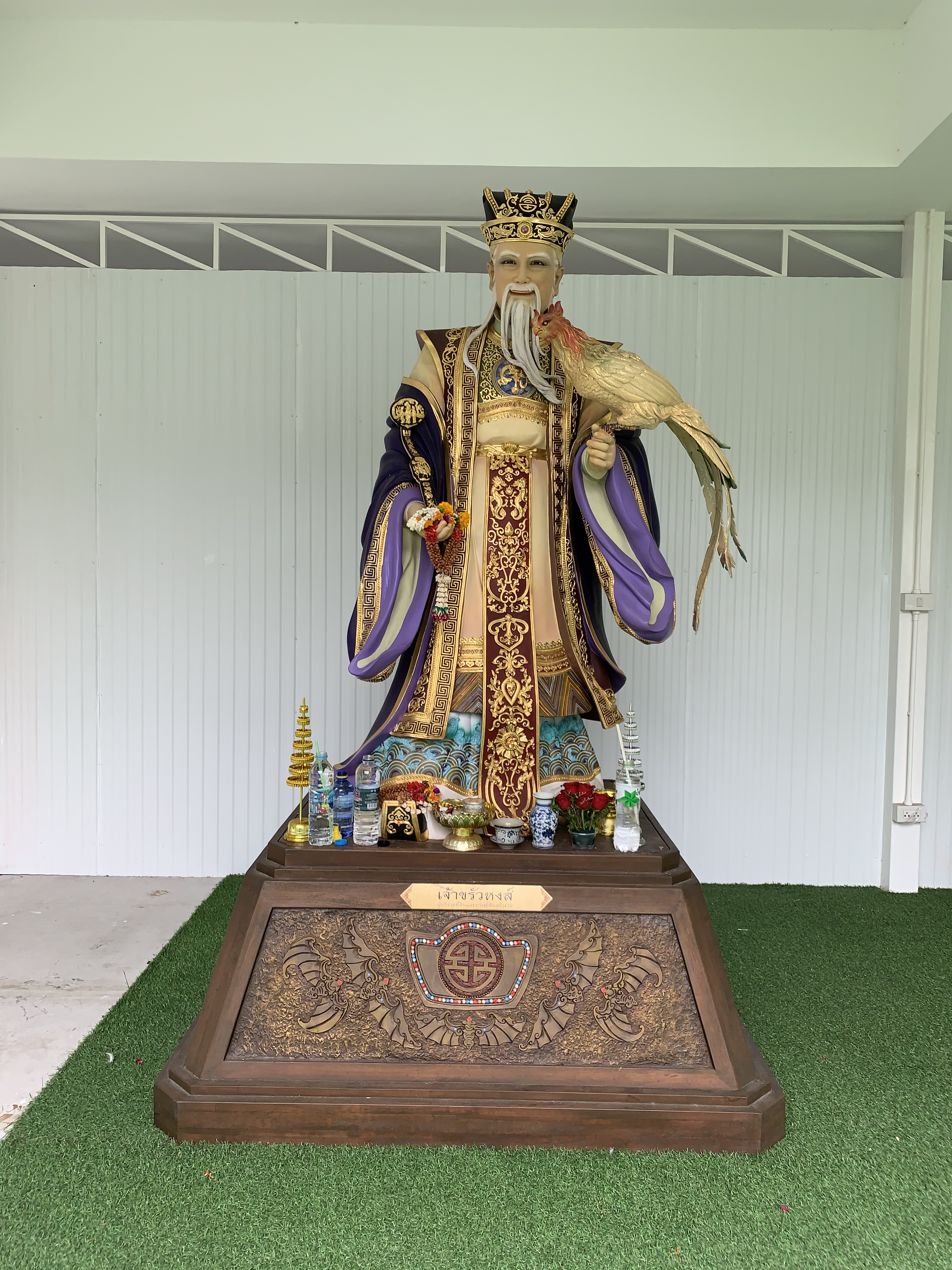
Chao Khrua Hong, the donor of land and assets for building the temple

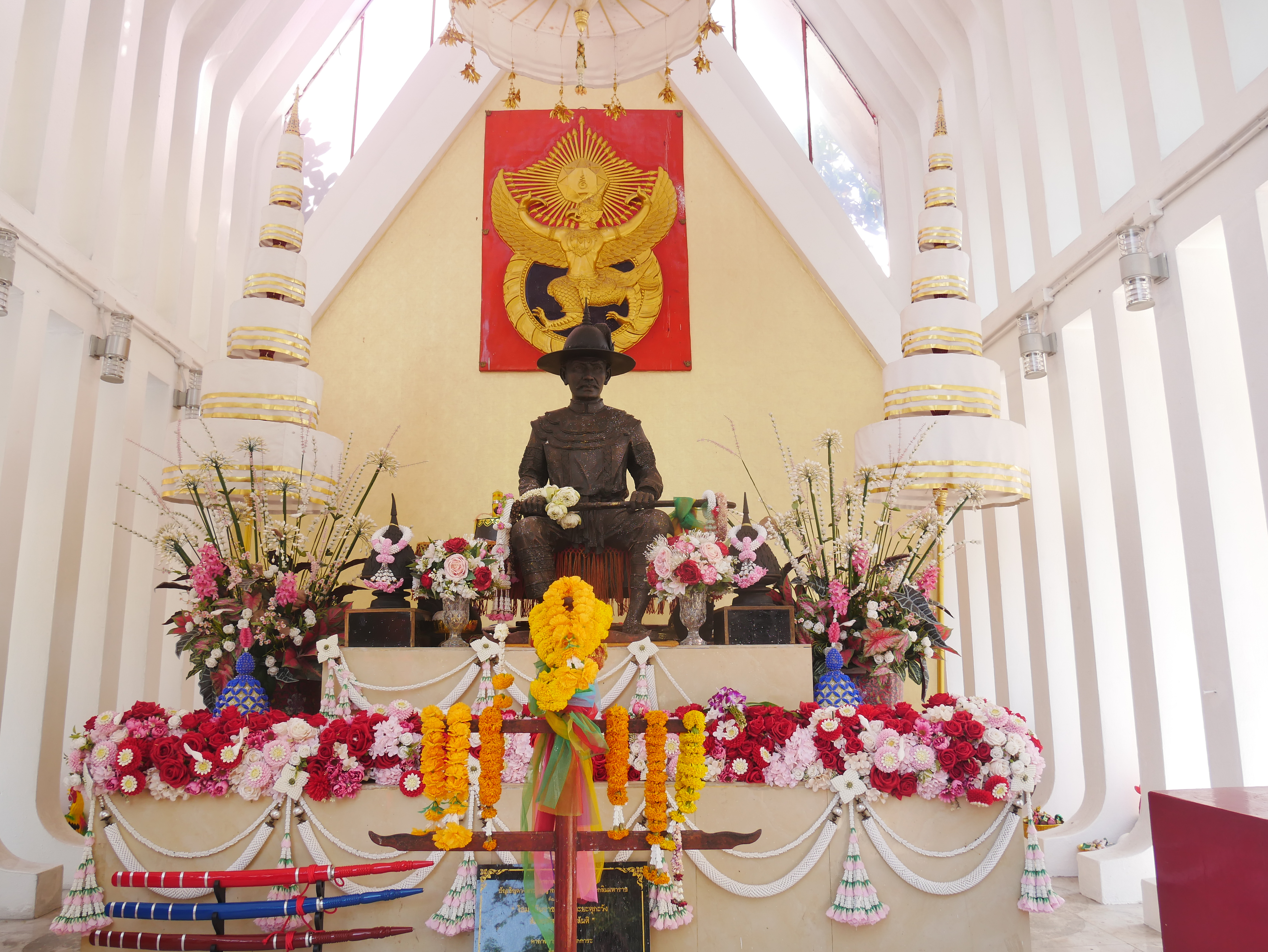
Shrine of King Taksin the Great

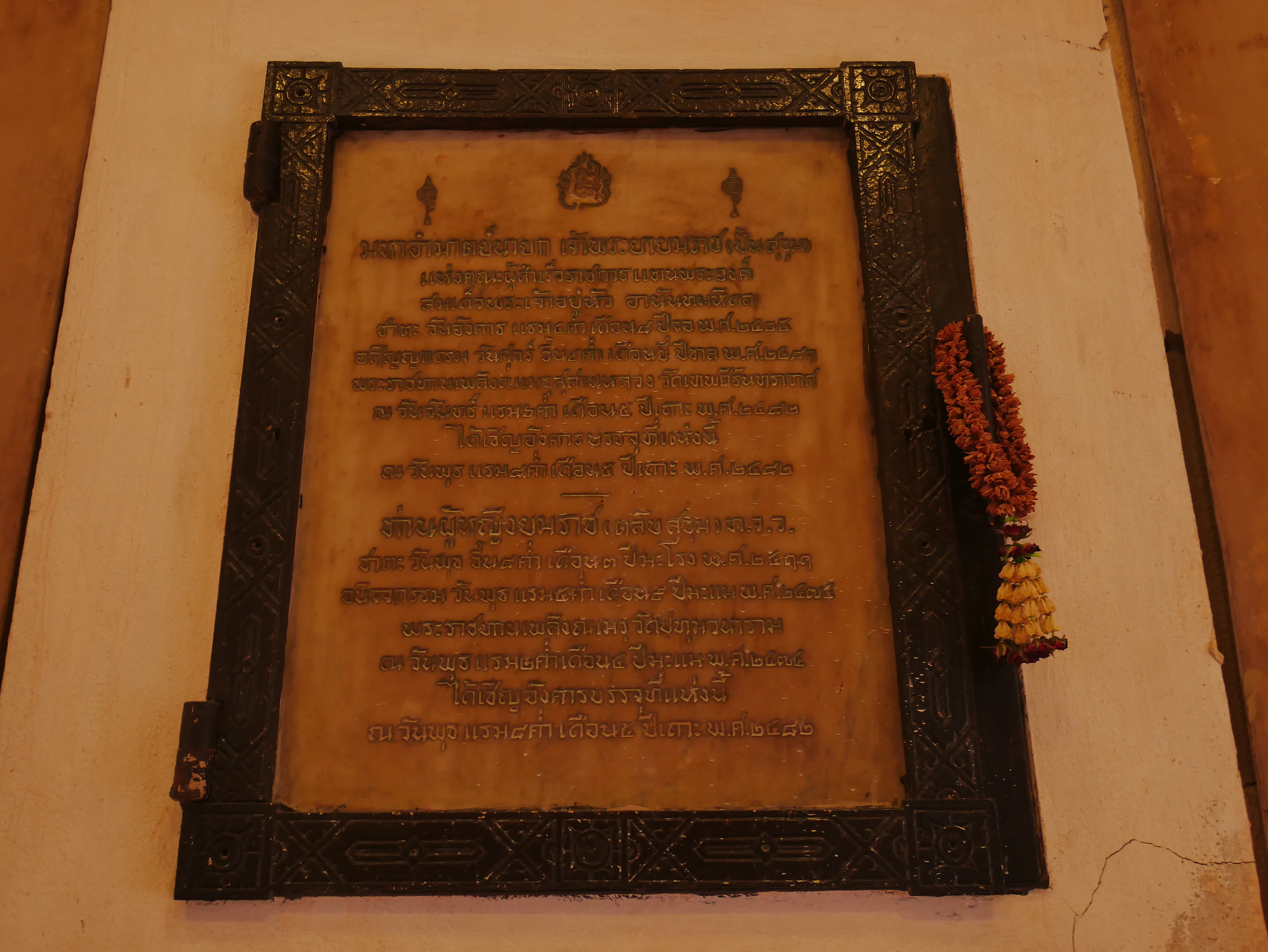
Ash container of Chao Phraya Yommarat (Pan Sukhum) and his wife inside the Ordination Hall

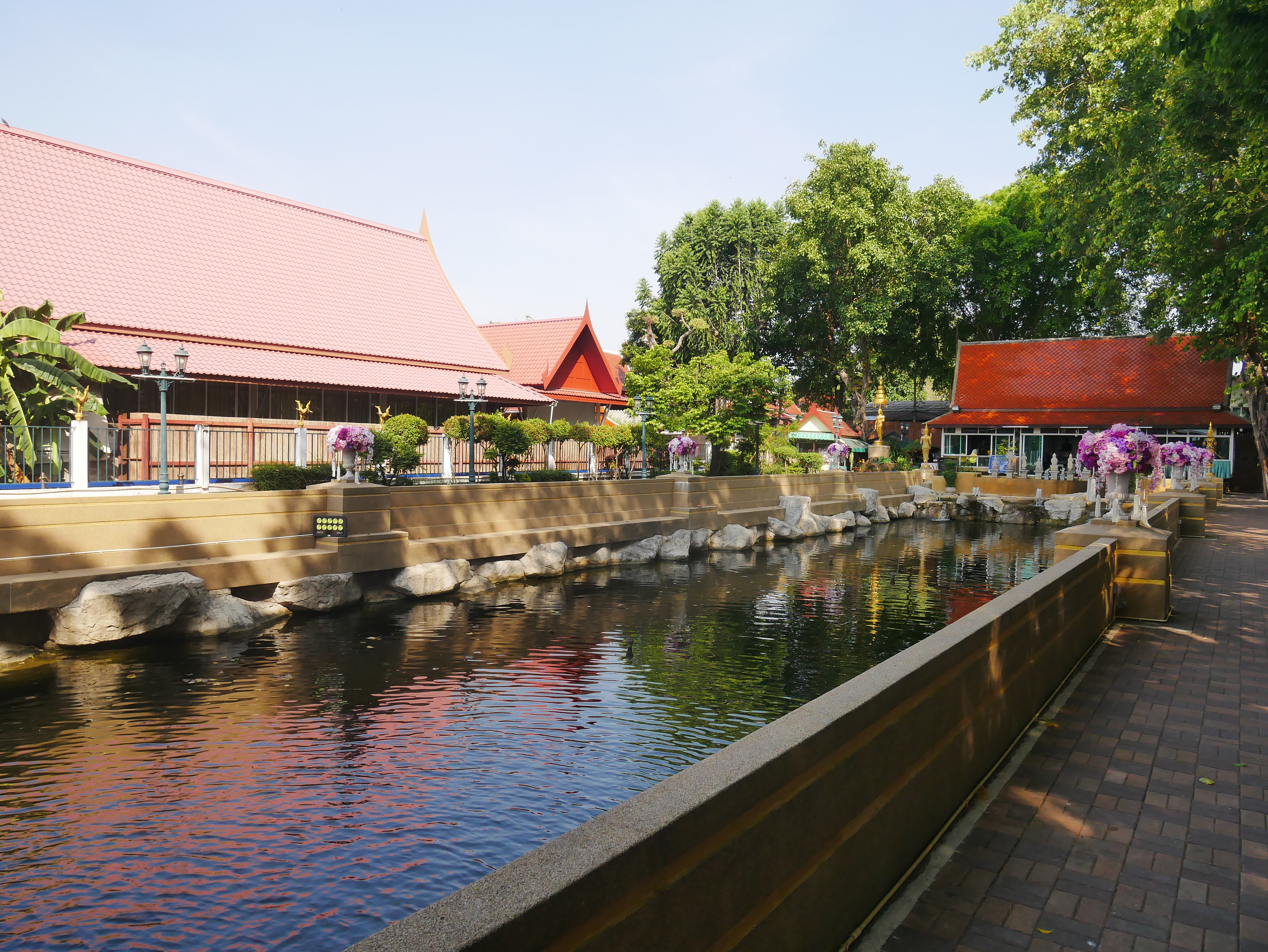
Sacred holy water well
