= Darunaman Mosque =

Mosque in Chiang Rai, Thailand

- มัสยิดดารุลอามาน
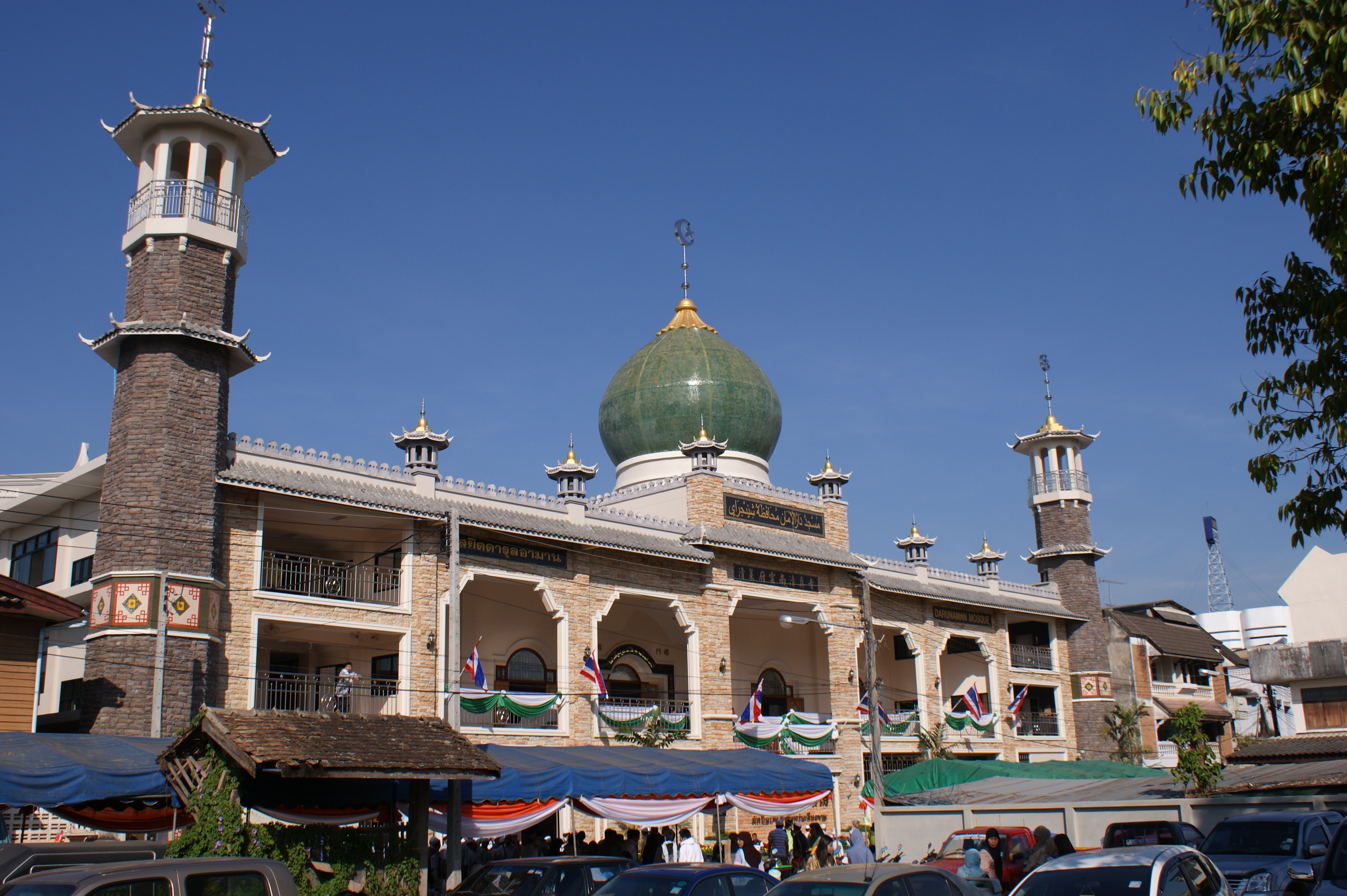

- Location of the mosque in Thailand

Religion
- Affiliation: Sunni Islam
- Ecclesiastical or organisational status: Mosque
- Status: Active

Location
- Location: Chiang Rai
- Country: Thailand
- Coordinates: 19°54′28.1″N 99°49′45.4″E

Architecture
- Type: Mosque architecture
- Style: Chinese
- Completed: 2009

Specifications
- Dome: One (maybe more)
- Minaret: Two

The Darun Aman Mosque (Thai: มัสยิดดารุลอามาน; RTGS: Matsayit Darun-aman), is the biggest Sunni mosque in the Chiang Rai Province of Thailand. The mosque was one of the mosques in northern Thailand built by Hui people, known as Chin Haw in Thai.

== Architecture ==
The new building was opened on 27 December 2009, replacing the old one. It is a mixture of Chinese and Islamic architecture. The main structure is influenced by Persian architecture with Chinese decorations. The tip of the two minarets has been replaced with the small Chinese pavilion, instead of a typical Islamic dome. Its total cost was around 20 million baht.

== Gallery ==
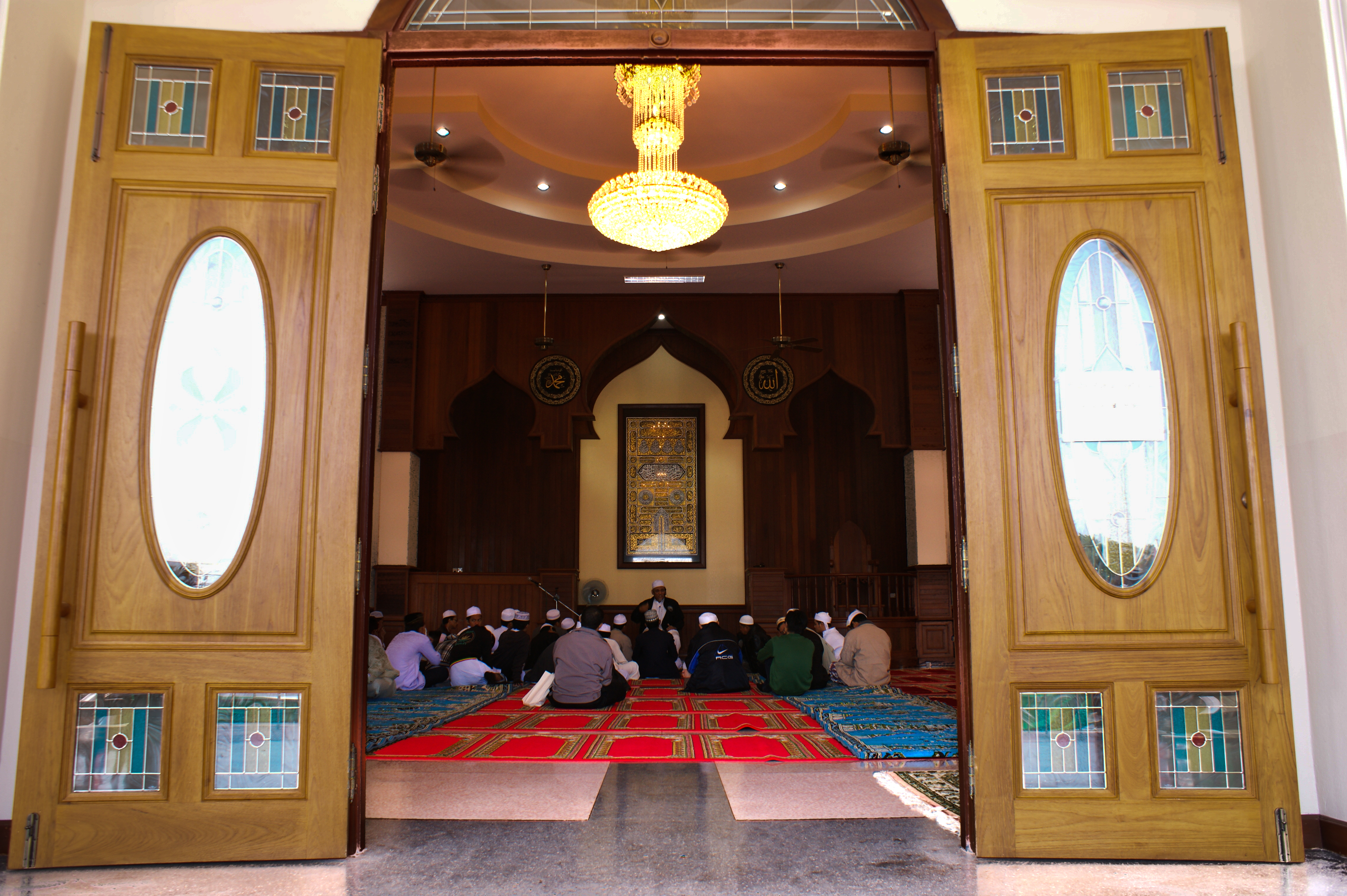
The main gate of the prayer hall

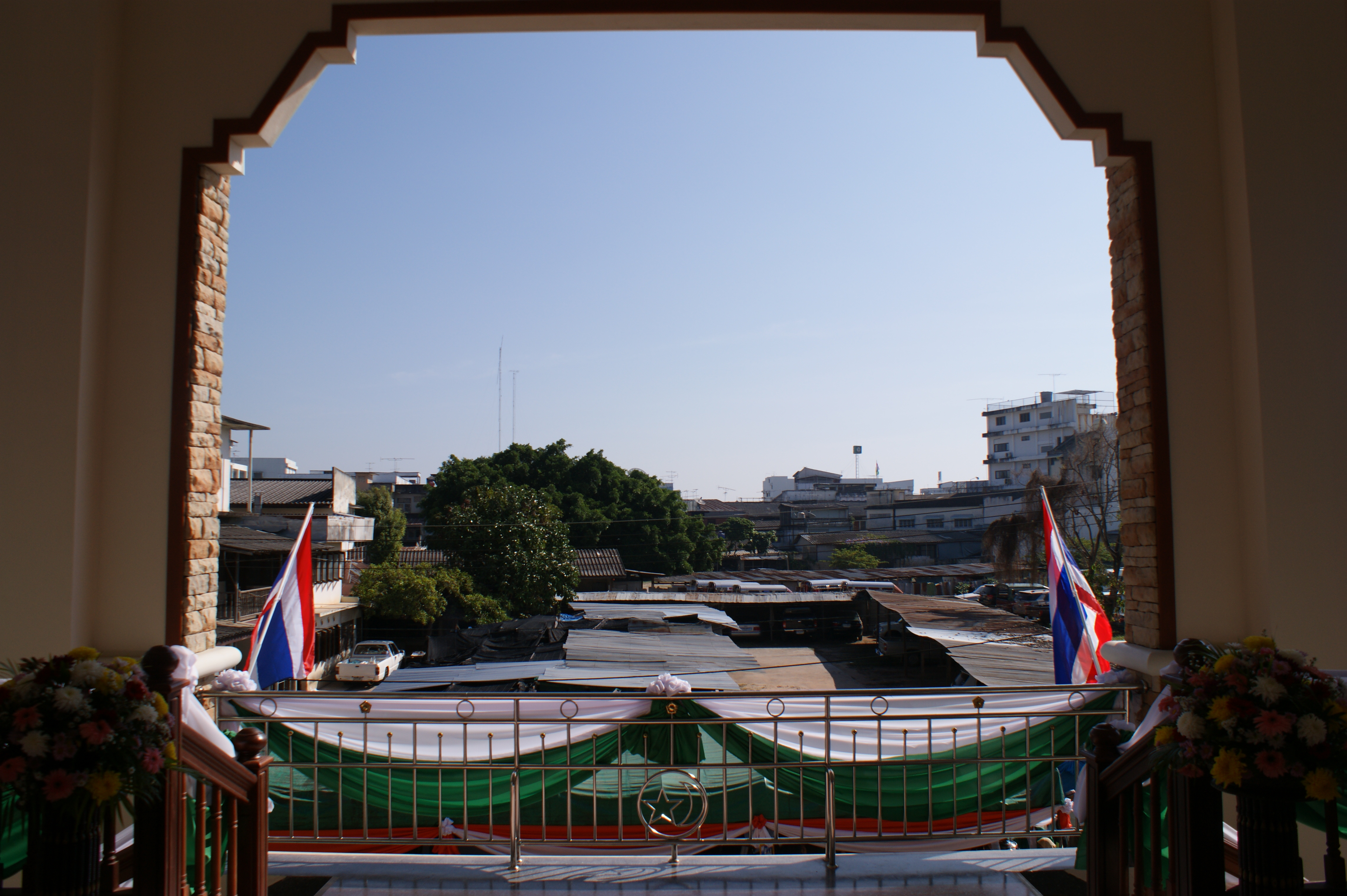
The central gate of the mosque, looking from inside

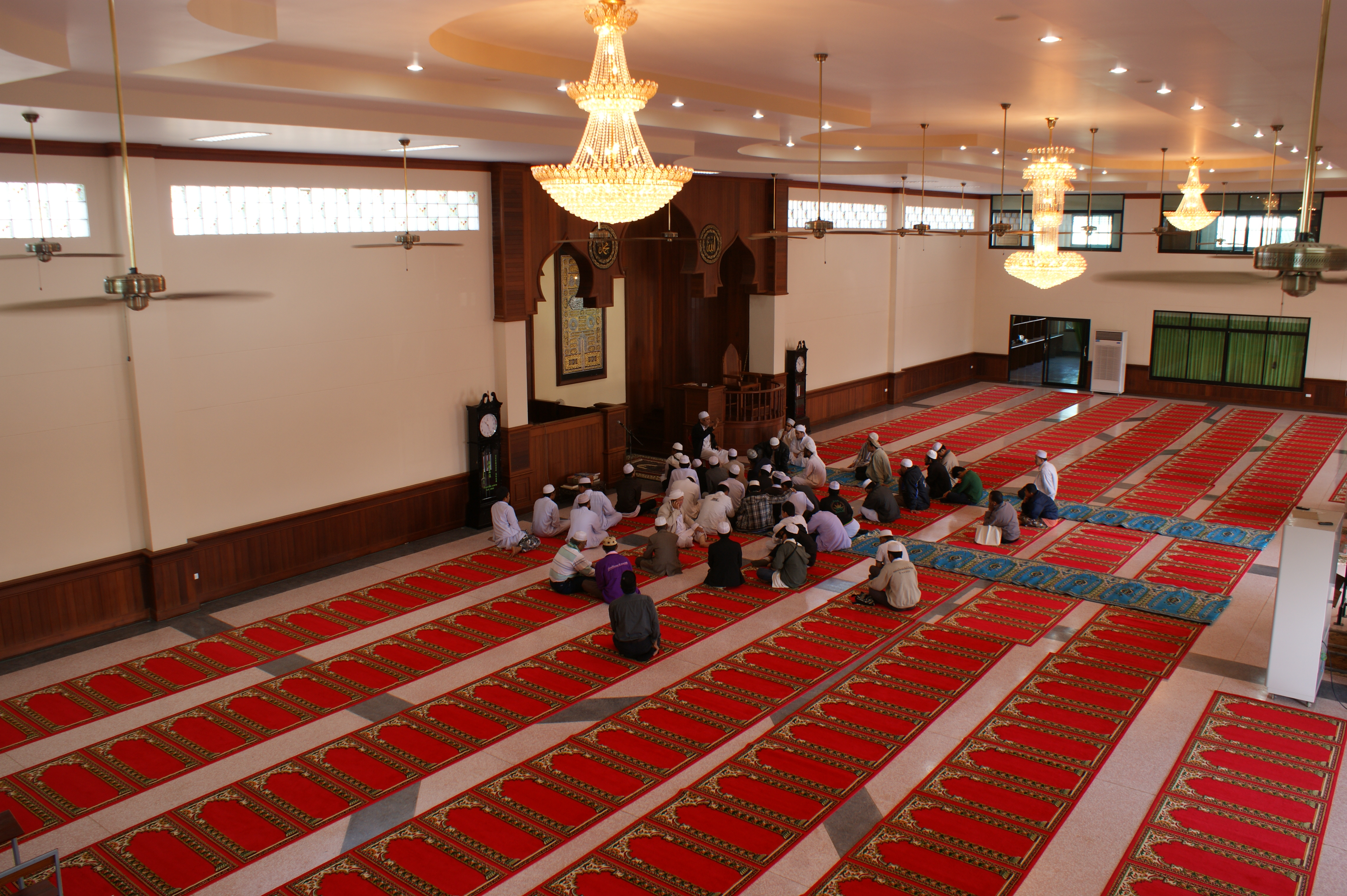
Inside the prayer hall with the three chandeliers, brought from China

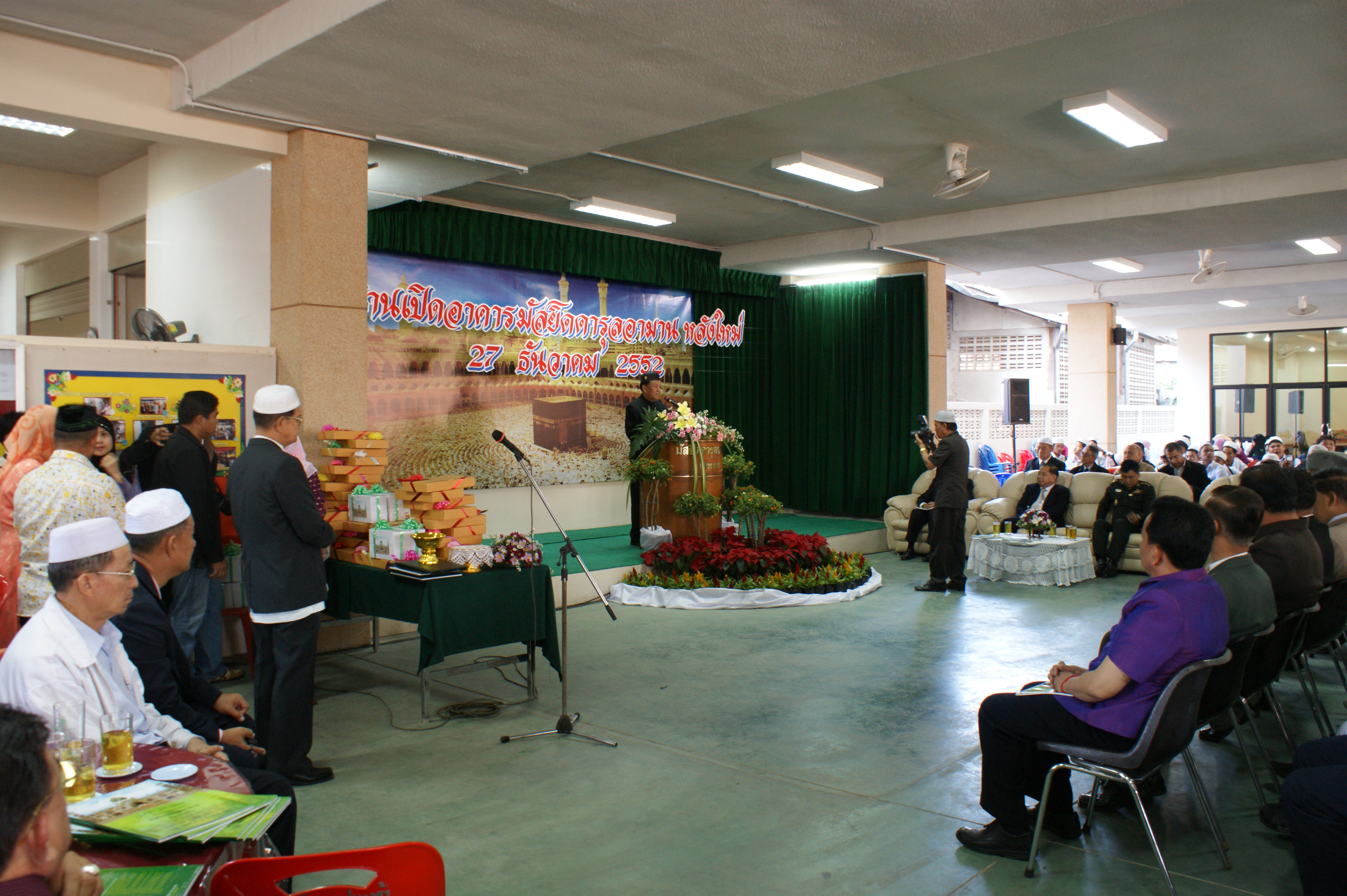
Wan Muhammad Noor Matha gave a speech in the opening ceremony of the new building

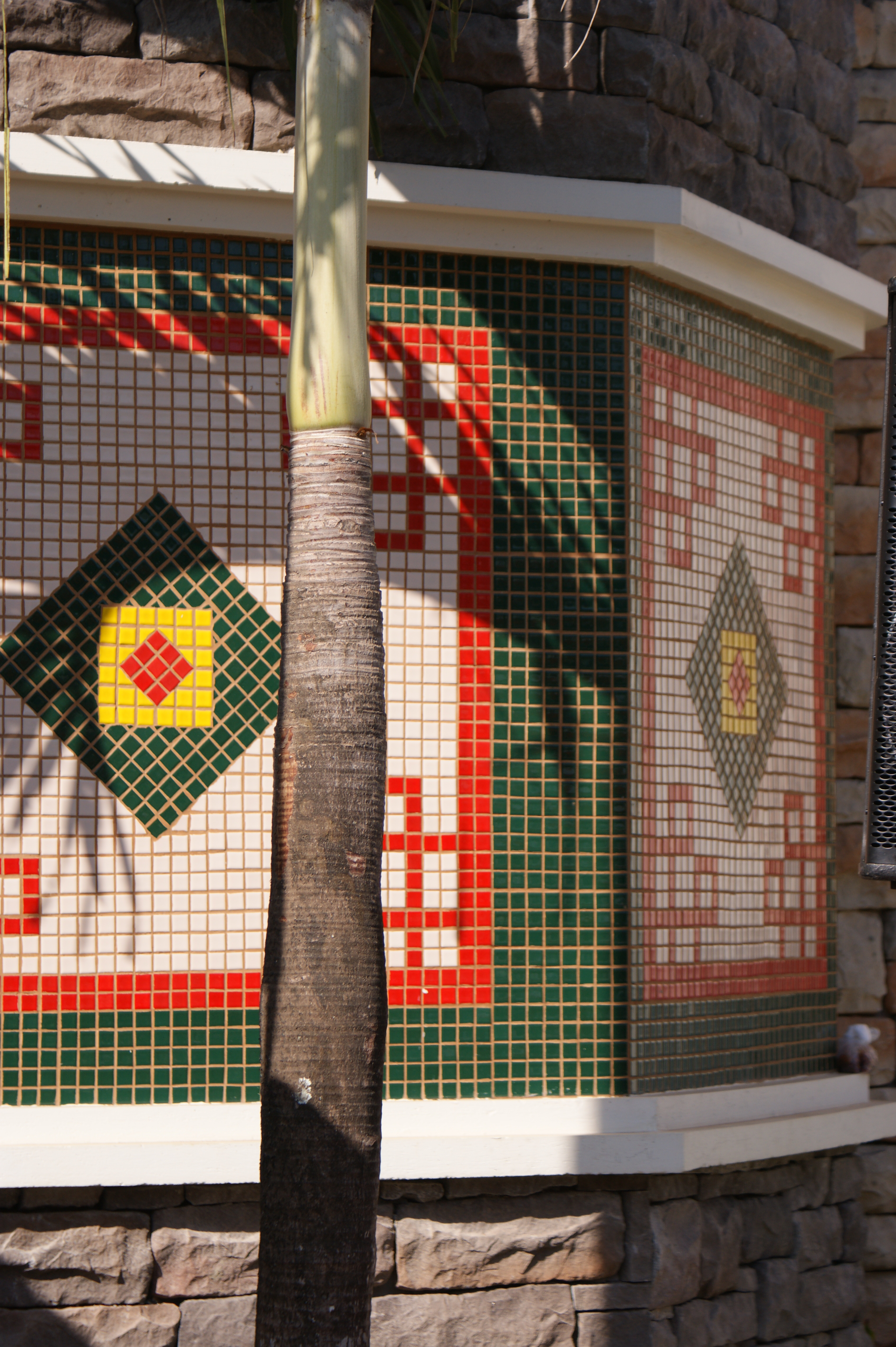
Chinese-style tilework

== See also ==
- Islam in Thailand
- List of mosques in Thailand
