= Chakraphong Mosque =

Mosque in Bangkok, Thailand

Coordinates: 13°45′42.65″N 100°29′49.07″E

- มัสยิดจักรพงษ์
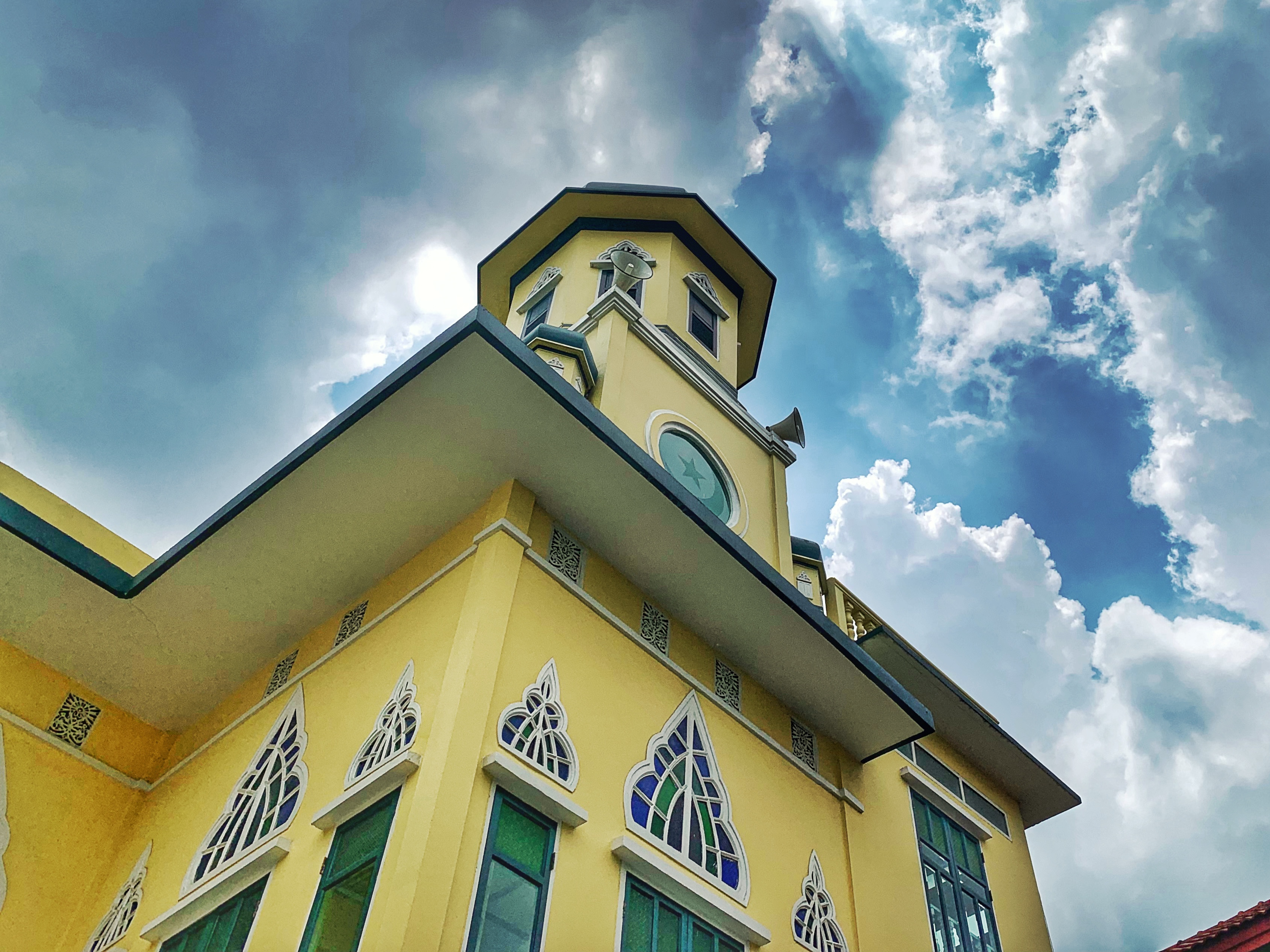

- Location within Bangkok

Religion
- Affiliation: Sunni Islam

Location
- Location: 70 Trok Surao Chakraphong, Chakrabongse rd, Chana Songkhram, Phra Nakhon, Bangkok
- Country: Thailand
- Interactive map of Chakraphong Mosque

Architecture
- Type: Mosque
- Style: Persian mixed Arab
- Founder: Pattani Muslims

Chakraphong Mosque (Thai: มัสยิดจักรพงษ์) is a historic mosque in Bangkok. It is considered the oldest mosque located in the inner city area, or Rattanakosin Island near the Grand Palace and royal field Sanam Luang.

This mosque dating back to the King Phutthayotfa Chulalok (Rama I)'s reign during the early Rattanakosin period. It was built by war captives brought back to Bangkok from Pattani after the autonomous Muslim sultanate in the south was subjugated by an army commanded by the younger brother of the King, Somdet Phra Bawornrajchao Maha Sura Singhanat. His Majesty the King allowed the Pattani Muslims to build houses and a mosque within the city walls, granting them land in Ban Tuek Din (along present-day Ratchadamnoen avenue near the Democracy Monument and Satriwitthaya School) and in Bang Lamphu (near Chakraphong road). Later, during King Nangklao (Rama III)'s reign, descendants of some of these people settled down along the banks of Khlong Maha Nak canal (now is Maha Nak Mosque in Bobae area).

In addition, these captives were also goldsmiths serving in the royal court of the King Phutthayotfa Chulalok. They were adept at making the decorative objects and other regalia needed for royal ceremonies.

Originally, it was named "Surao Tong Pu" (สุเหร่าตองปุ) according to the names of nearby wat (Thai temple), Wat Tong Pu (later Wat Chana Songkhram). It was renamed Chakraphong Mosque according to the name of the road where its location, Chakraphong road (or spelled Chakrabongse), the short road named in honour of Prince Chakrabongse, who was one of the sons of King Chulalongkorn (Rama V).

Formerly, the building was entirely wooden. And renovated into a three-story yellow concrete building today.

== See also ==
- Islam in Thailand
- List of mosques in Thailand
