= List of mosques in Thailand =

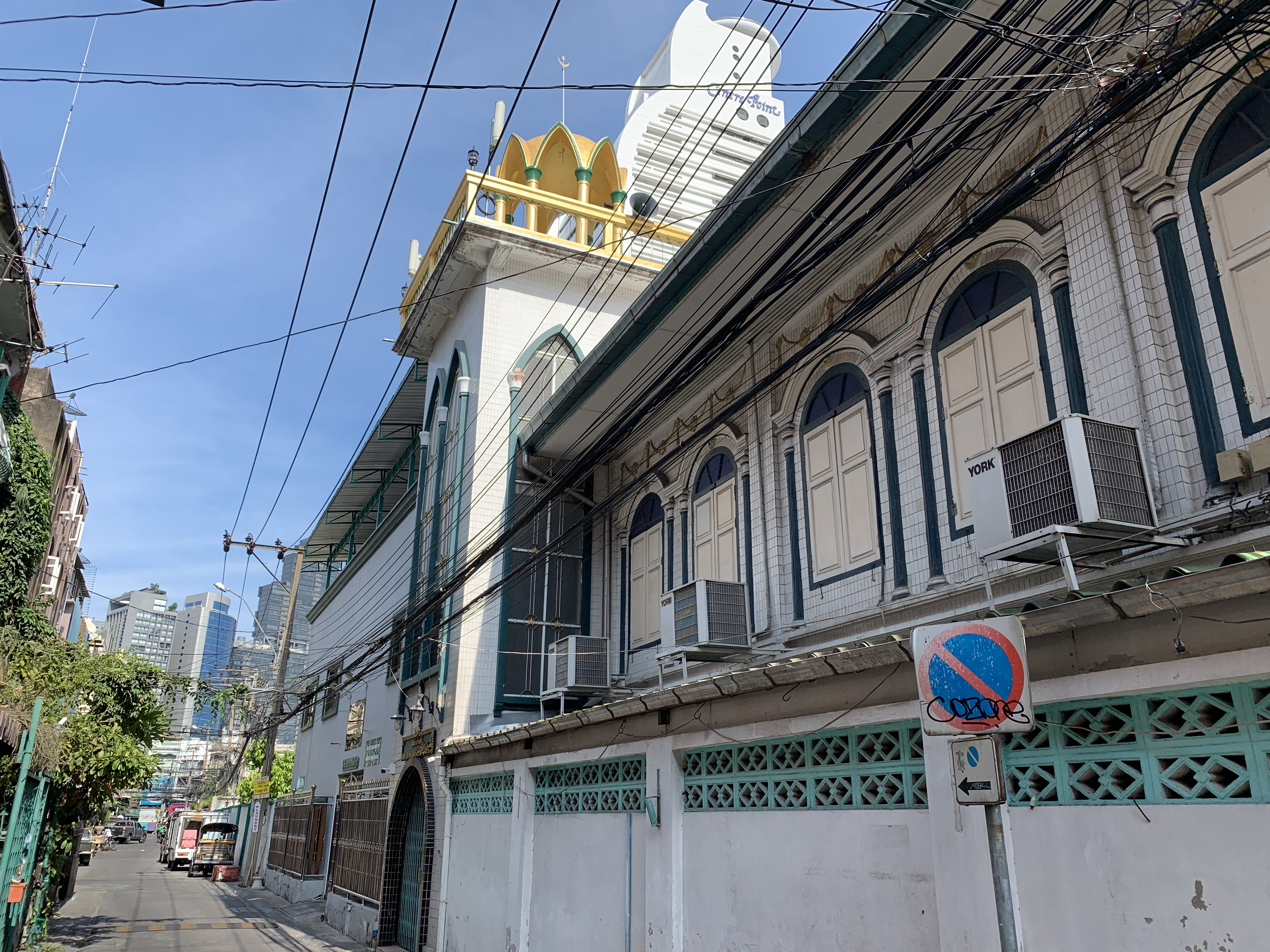
Ban Oou Mosque, Bangkok was the first mosque to be officially registered to the Thai government as a mosque.

There are 4,037 mosques in Thailand as of March 2022. The Southern region has the most number of mosques in the kingdom with 3,403 mosques or roughly 85% of all mosques. In terms of provinces; Pattani Province has the biggest share at 720 mosques, followed by Narathiwat Province with 679 mosques, and Yala Province with 519 mosques, whilst the capital city, Bangkok, has 187 mosques.

The lists below are some notable mosques in Thailand by regions:

== Bangkok ==
Name	Image	District	Sub-district	Founded
Kudi Charoenphat		Bangkok Yai	Wat Arun	1785
Goowatin Islam Mosque (Tuek Daeng)		Khlong San	Somdet Chao Phraya	1959
Chakraphong Mosque		Phra Nakhon	Chana Songkhram	1922
Saifee Mosque (Teuk Khao)		Khlong San		1910
Darulaman Phayathai Mosque		Ratchathewi	Thung Phayathai	
Ton Son Mosque		Bangkok Yai	Wat Arun	1668
Bang Luang Mosque (Kudi Khao)		Thonburi	Wat Kanlayan	
Bang Ao Mosque	Bang Ao mosque 05.2023 (I)	Bang Phalt	Bang O	1918
Bang Uthit Mosque		Bang Kho Laem	Wat Phraya Krai	1915
Ban Teuk Din Mosque[id]		Phra Nakhon	Bowonniwet	
Ban Oou Mosque		Bang Rak	Bang Rak	1947
Phadung Tham Islam Mosque		Bangkok Yai	Wat Arun	
Mahanak Mosque		Pom Prap Sattru Phai	Khlong Mahanak	1993
Thai-Pakistan Friendship Mosque		Bang Rak	Si Phraya	
Jawa Mosque		Sathon	Yannawa	1905
Khlong Chan Mosque (Ridhwanun)		Bang Kapi	Khlong Chan	1949
Luang Kocha Itsahak Mosque		Samphanthawong	Samphanthawong	
Indonesia Mosque		Pathum Wan	Lumphini	
Khlong Khlet Mosque		Suan Luang	Suan Luang	
Haroon Mosque		Bang Rak	Bang Rak	1828
Thailand Central Mosque		Suan Luang	Suan Luang	1954
Jamiul Idhard Mosque		Suan Luang	Phattanakhan	

== Central ==
Mosque name	Image	Province	District	Founded
Kudi Chofa Mosque		Ayutthaya	Phra Nakhon Si Ayutthaya	1616
Kaew Nimit Mosque		Pathum Thani	Khlong Luang	

== Northern ==
Mosque name	Image	Province	District	Founded
Darunaman Mosque, Chiang Rai		Chiang Rai	Mueang	1910
Attaqwa Mosque		Chiang Mai		
Ban Ho Mosque		Chiang Mai	Mueang	1915
Abubar Hafis Mosque		Chiang Rai	Mae Sai	

== Northeastern ==
Mosque name	Image	Province	District	Founded
Anwarussalam Mosque		Buriram	Mueang	
Khon Kaen Mosque		Khon Kaen	Mueang	
Bueng Kan Mosque		Bueng Kan	Pak Khat	2016

== Southern ==
Mosque name	Image	Province	District	Founded
Talo Mano Mosque (300 Years Mosque)		Narathiwat	Bacho	1624
Krue Se Mosque		Pattani	Mueang	unknown
Krabi Central Mosque		Krabi	Mueang	
Nakhon Si Thammarat Central Mosque		Nakhon Si Thammarat	Mueang	2014
Narathiwat Central Mosque		Narathiwat	Mueang	1981
Pattani Central Mosque[th]		Pattani	Mueang	1954
Yala Central Mosque		Yala	Mueang	
Satun Central Mosque		Satun	Mueang	
Panyee Darussalam Mosque		Phang Nga	Mueang	
Prince of Songkhla University Mosque		Narathiwat	Mueang	
Muqarrom Mosque		Phuket	Thalang	
Ao Nang Mosque		Krabi	Mueang	1945
Aho Mosque		Pattani	Yaring	
Yameay Mosque		Phuket	Mueang	

== See also ==
- Islam in Thailand
- Lists of mosques
