= Bang Luang Mosque =

Mosque in Bangkok, Thailand

- มัสยิดบางหลวง
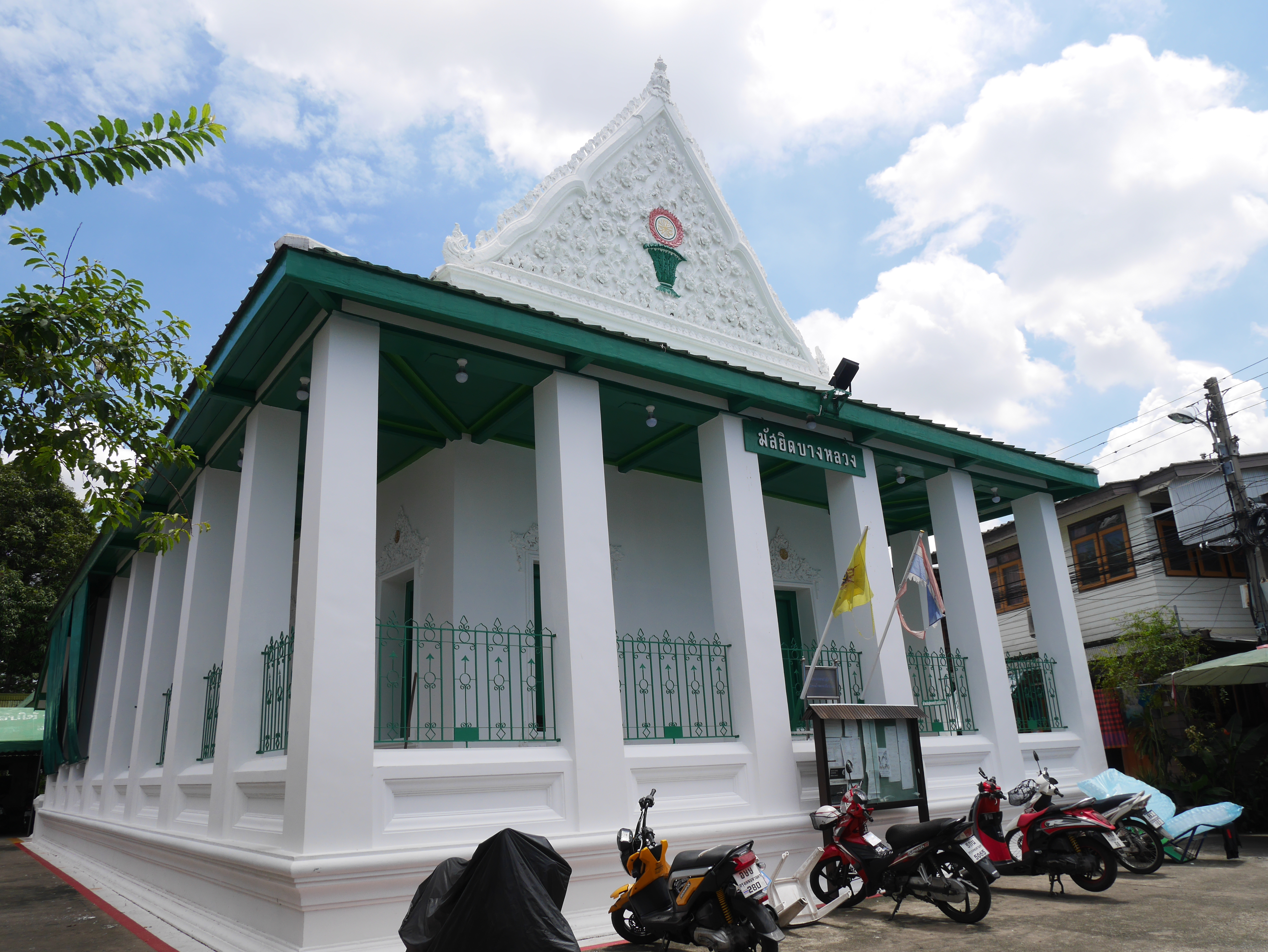

- Location of the mosque in Bangkok

Religion
- Affiliation: Sunni Islam
- Ecclesiastical or organizational status: Mosque
- Status: Active

Location
- Location: 151, Soi Arun Amarin 7, Arun Amarin Road, Wat Kanlaya Subdistrict, Thonburi District, Bangkok
- Country: Thailand
- Interactive map of Bang Luang Mosque
- Coordinates: 13°44′17″N 100°29′22″E

Architecture
- Type: Mosque architecture
- Style: Thai; Chinese; European
- Founder: To Yi
- Groundbreaking: c. 1784 CE
- Completed: 1786 CE

Specifications
- Length: 24 m (79 ft)
- Width: 12 m (39 ft)
- Height (max): 16 m (52 ft)

Bang Luang Mosque (Thai: มัสยิดบางหลวง, RTGS: Matsayit Bang Luang, pronounced [mát.sà(ʔ).jìt.bāːŋ.lǔaŋ]) is a historic mosque, located in Soi Arun Amarin 7, New Arun Amarin Road, Wat Kanlaya Subdistrict, Thon Buri District, of Bangkok. The mosque is situated on the Thonburi side within Kudi Khao Community by the Khlong Bangkok Yai (formerly Khlong Bang Luang) near mouth of Chao Phraya River. The mosque is also known as Kudi Khao (กุฎีขาว, lit. 'white cloister') and Kudi To Yi (กุฎีโต๊ะหยี, lit. 'To Yi's cloister').

== Overview ==
This mosque was built in the early Rattanakosin period (c. 1784 CE) during the reign of King Phutthayotfa Chulalok (Rama I) by a Muslim merchant named "To Yi" (โต๊ะหยี).

The mosque is decorated with Thai brick and painted in white color, which gave the mosque its name. It is the only Thai-style mosque in the world, decorated with three-tiered art including Thai, Chinese and European. There's embodiment of the spirit of the goddess reflecting the devotion of Allah. Furthermore, they're tombs located in front of the mosque and the mosque is now being classified as “Unseen in Bangkok” tourist destination.

Bang Luang Mosque is located not far from other houses of worship, including Wat Prayurawongsawat, Wat Kalayanamitr, Santa Cruz Church and Kian Un Keng Shrine. Opposite the old mosque stands another important one, Tonson Mosque.

== See also ==
- Islam in Thailand
- List of mosques in Thailand
