= Egypt–Thailand relations =

- Egypt: Thailand

Egypt and Thailand began diplomatic relations in 1954. Egypt is the first Arab nation with whom Thailand has formal diplomatic ties. There are no political disputes between the two parties, and they have improved their mutual collaboration and established cordial connections in a number of sectors through the use of the current mechanisms—political consultation at the senior official level and the Joint Commission at the foreign ministry level. The two nations are members of the G20 developing nations, Non-Aligned Movement and the World Trade Organization (WTO). In 2012, around 2331 Thais reside in Egypt.

== History ==
During the reign of King Chulalongkorn, Thailand actively developed diplomatic ties with European and American countries. Chulalongkorn himself visited Egypt via the Suez Canal on his first trip to Europe in the 19th century. Thailand had already established formal ties with Egypt under the Ottoman Empire in the late 19th century. The royal families of the two nations exchanged certain things throughout the period. However, Thailand did not establish diplomatic ties with the subsequently formed Republic of Egypt until 27 September 1954.

The nationalization of the Suez Canal was Egypt's sovereign right, according to Thai Prime Minister Luang Phibun Somkhon, who supported Egypt's defense of its sovereignty over the waterway in 1956 during the Second Middle East War. However, it was also thought that Egypt needed to make up for the losses incurred by the canal's shareholders and ensure its freedom of navigation. Following the adoption of the "New Foreign Policy" in the 1970s, Thailand made a commitment to fortifying its bilateral ties with Egypt. Since then, there has been additional development in the two nations' relations.

During her maiden tour to Asia in 1976, Egypt's maiden Lady Jehan Sadat made her first visit to Thailand, where she signed the first agreement on scientific, cultural, and educational cooperation between the two nations. Through political consultation meetings like the Ministerial Meeting of the Joint Commission and the Political Consultative Meeting of Assistant Ministers of Foreign Affairs, as well as through their cooperation in international organizations like the United Nations and the Organization of Islamic Cooperation (where Thailand is an observer state), the two nations have strengthened high-level exchanges since 2003.

On March 17, 2021, H.E. Mr. Thani Thongphakdi, Thailand's Permanent Secretary for Foreign Affairs, had a courtesy call from H.E. Mr. Moustapha Mahmoud Moustapha Elkouny, then ambassador of Egypt to Thailand. The main topic of conversation was how to strengthen the two nations' bilateral ties. In order to benefit from Thailand's vast knowledge and competence, Egypt wants to expand its collaboration in five major areas: education, commerce and investment, tourism, culture and fisheries.

Following her appointment to the position, H.E. Mrs. Hala Youssef Ahmed Ragab, the Egyptian ambassador to Thailand, paid a courtesy call on Mrs. Kanchana Patarachoke, the director general of the Department of Information, on February 15, 2024. In honor of the 70th anniversary of the start of their diplomatic ties, both parties decided to further develop the vibrancy of Thailand-Egypt relations with a number of events that will take place during 2024. They also talked about potential approaches of disseminating information to the people of Egypt and Thailand. Additionally, both parties discussed ways to improve people-to-people ties, tourism, education, and cultural collaboration.

== Cultural exchanges ==
A cultural, educational, and scientific cooperation agreement was signed by two countries in 1976 during Jehan Sadat's visit to Thailand. This agreement established a legal framework for future artistic and cultural interactions. Thailand then dispatched folk artists to take part in the Egyptian International Folklore Festival. To promote Egypt's positive artistic image in Thailand, the Egyptian Embassy in that country collaborated with the National Children's Cultural Center to host a painting competition with the topic "Egypt in the Eyes of Youth" and a contest for handmade toys. To commemorate the 60th anniversary of the start of diplomatic ties and to promote Thai culture, the Thai Embassy also organized an art and cultural festival in Egypt in 2014.

As a result of the lack of any agreements pertaining to visa waivers, nationals of the two nations require visas in order to enter each other's country. Nevertheless, 24,096 Egyptian visitors traveled to Thailand in 2017, whereas roughly 17,527 Thai tourists traveled to Egypt in the same year.

Regarding schooling, Egypt, a pioneer in Islamic studies, and many of its universities are also well-liked by Thai Muslim students. Although Thailand is primarily a Buddhist country, there are still many Muslim communities that practice Islam in four of the provinces in Southern Thailand. Egypt's Mufti and Al-Azhar Imams have also traveled to Thailand to encourage educational exchanges between the two countries. Egypt's higher education institutions have developed cordial links with Thailand's partner universities to collaboratively carry out educational cooperation projects. Additionally, several Egyptian academics were dispatched to Thailand to instruct Arabic. Each year, Al-Azhar University provides 80 scholarships to Muslim students from Thailand to help them pay for their education in Egypt. 3,500 Thai students were enrolled in 2022 at Egyptian universities, including Al-Azhar University, to continue their education. However, Thailand also frequently grants complete scholarships to Egyptian students who wish to apply for further study in Thailand under the International Graduate Program.

== Economic relations ==
The two nations have signed several bilateral treaties, including the Agreement on Mutual Encouragement and Protection of Investments and the Agreement on the Avoidance of Double Taxation, since the first trade agreement was signed in 1984. These agreements have given the regular economic and trade exchanges between Thailand and Egypt a certain legal foundation. Bilateral trade has gotten stronger as a result.

Egypt is the target of certain investment initiatives from Thailand; PetroThailand has been supplying natural gas and other energy supplies to Egypt since 2008; Additionally, the chemical company Yindu Rama has bought peer companies in Egypt and holds a particular position in the country's plastics industry; A few Egyptian businesses have begun making investments in Thailand, primarily in the hospitality industry.

Egypt exported $106 million to Thailand in 2022. Petroleum gas ($184 million), small iron containers ($32.5 million), and vaccines, blood, antisera, toxins, and cultures ($2.43 million) were Egypt's top exports to Thailand. Egypt's exports to Thailand have grown at an annualized rate of 69.1% over the last five years, from $7.66 million in 2017 to $106 million in 2022.

Thailand exported $769 million to Egypt in 2022. Processed fish ($176 million), polycarboxylic acids ($157 million), and automobile parts and accessories (8701 to 8705) ($87.5 million) were Thailand's top exports to Egypt. Thailand's exports to Egypt have grown at an annualized rate of 48.1% over the last five years, from $108 million in 2017 to $769 million in 2022.

== Diplomatic missions ==
- Egypt maintains an embassy in Bangkok.
- Thailand maintains an embassy in Cairo.

== See also ==
- Foreign relations of Egypt
- Foreign relations of Thailand
