= Ban Ho Mosque =

Mosque in Chiang Mai, Thailand

- มัสยิดเฮดายาตูลอิสลามบ้านฮ่อ
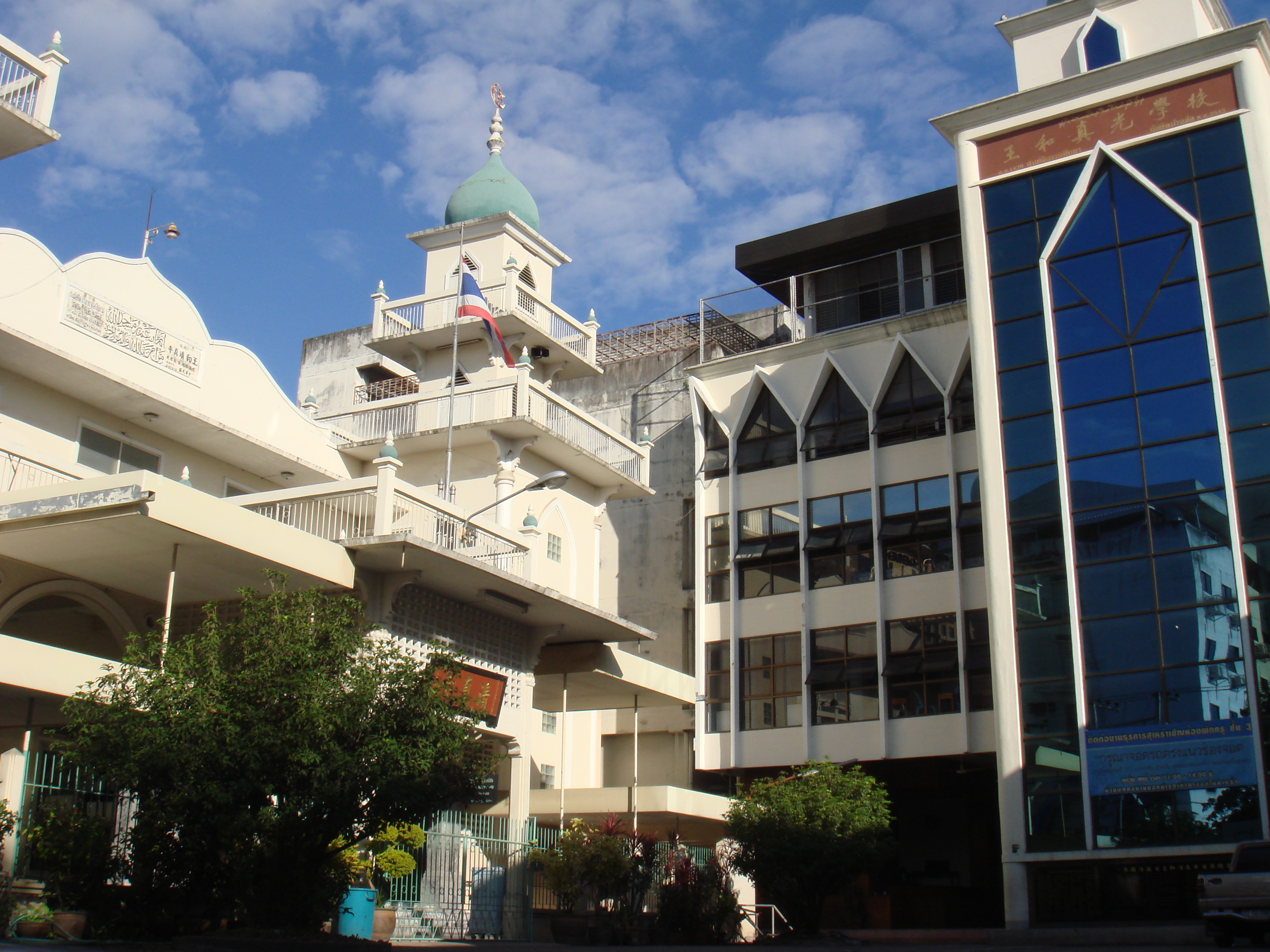
- On the left is the prayer hall, and on the right is the educational hall

- Location of the mosque in Thailand

Religion
- Affiliation: Sunni Islam
- Ecclesiastical or organizational status: Mosque
- Status: Active

Location
- Location: Chiang Mai
- Country: Thailand
- Interactive map of Ban Ho Mosque
- Coordinates: 18°47′12″N 99°0′4″E

Architecture
- Type: Mosque architecture
- Completed: 19th century
- Minaret: Two

The Hedaytul Islam (Ban Ho) Mosque (Thai: มัสยิดเฮดายาตูลอิสลามบ้านฮ่อ; Chinese: 王和清真寺; pinyin: wánghéqīngzhēnsì), near the Chiang Mai Night Bazaar, is one of the biggest mosques in the province, and also one of the seven mosques in Chiang Mai, Thailand, founded by Chinese migrants.

== History ==
The mosque was built in nineteenth century by a group of Chinese people, called Chin Haw (Chin Ho) or Hui, mostly from Yunnan Province. The present-day buildings were built later, in Arabic, rather than Chinese-style, except in front of the prayer hall, where there is the Chinese phrase, "清真寺" or qingzhensi, which means a mosque (literally 'temple of purity and truth').

== Education ==
Every Saturday and Sunday, there is a class for young Muslims, from 08:00 to the noon prayer (dhuhr). Every year the mosque enrolls, gratis, 20 students who cannot afford government school.

== Imams ==
Name	Thai Name	Tenure
Imam Ma Yuting (马雨亭)	Pirun Maipaphot	1925-47
Imam Li Renfu (李仁普)		1947-76
Imam Masuliang	Surin Mancharas	1976-79
Imam Matinghua Ibrahim		1979-93
Imam Na Sun Ching		1993-99
Imam Changfu Saephan (Ibrahim)		1999-Present

== Gallery ==
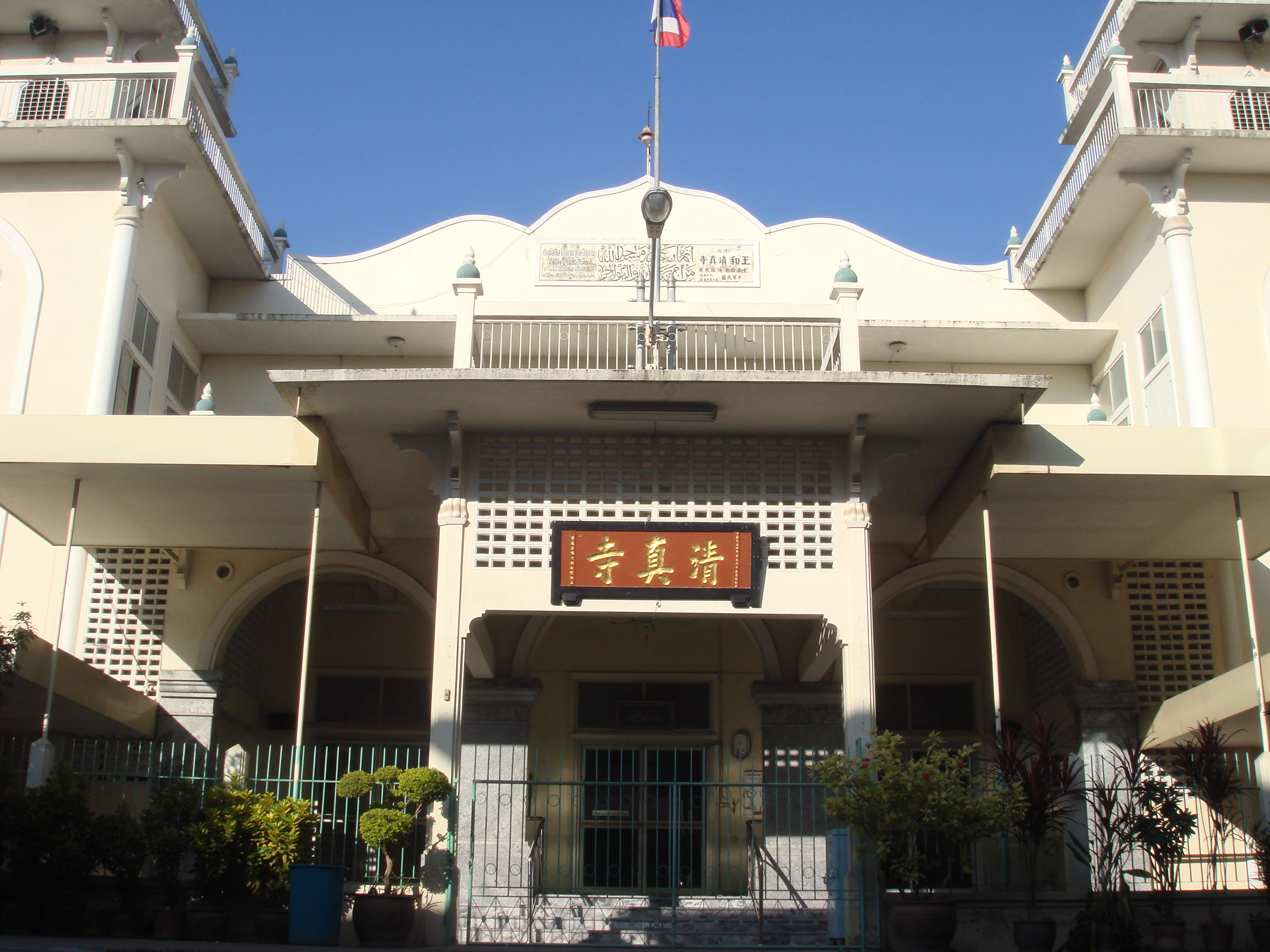
Chinese: 清真寺; pinyin: qingzhensi, meaning mosque

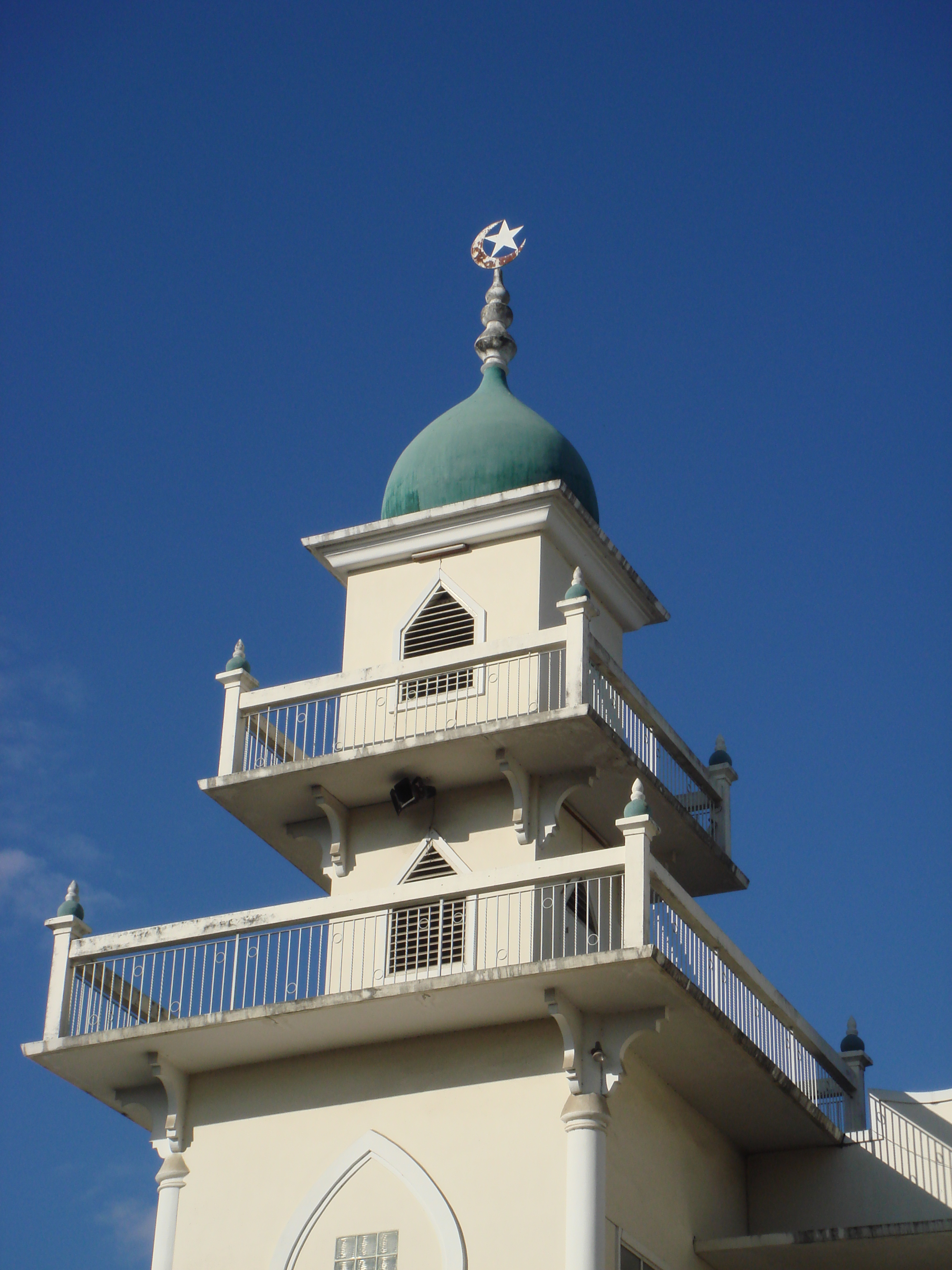
The left minaret of the mosque

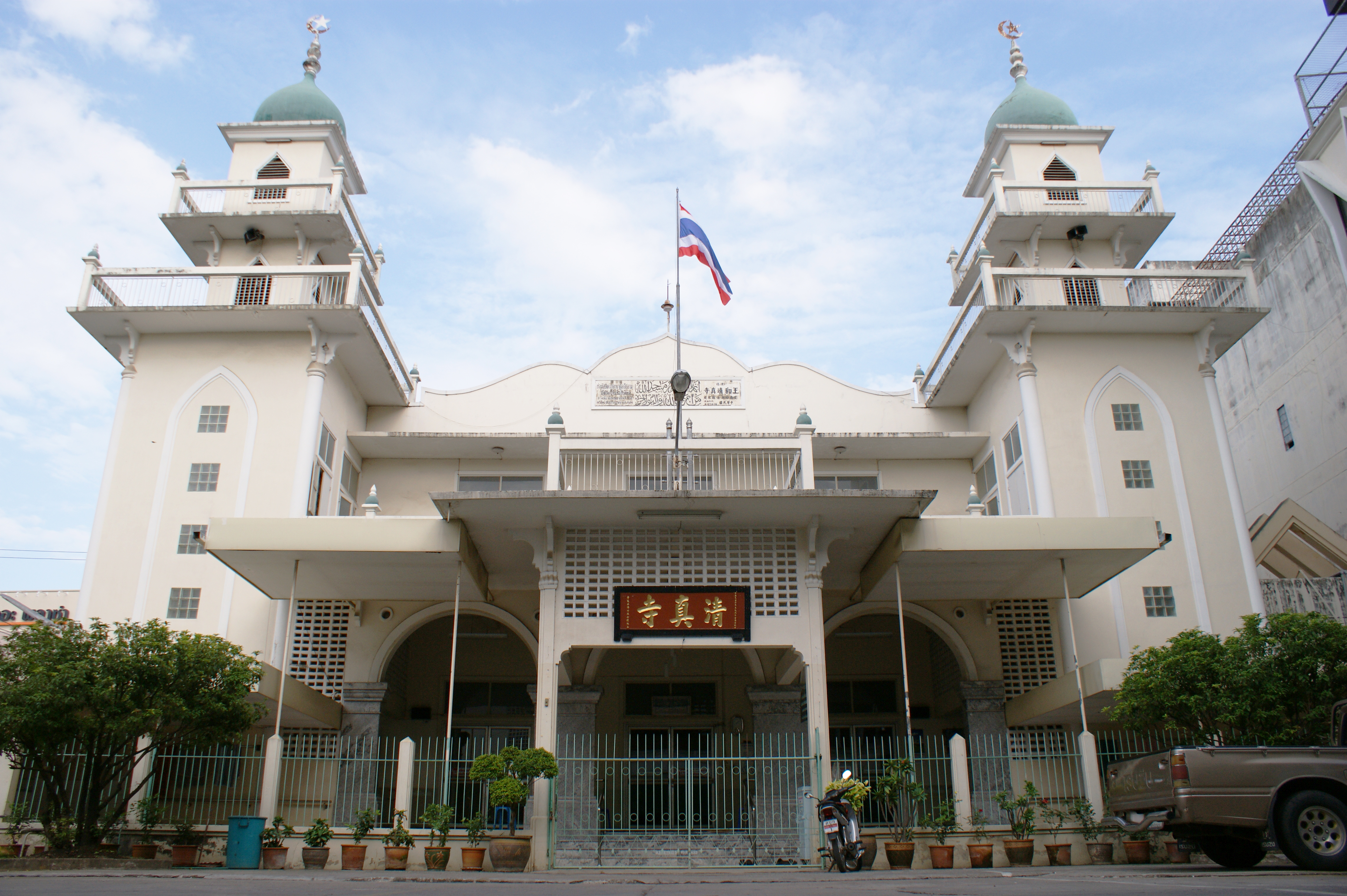
The main building

== See also ==
- Islam in Thailand
- List of mosques in Thailand
