= Kampung Jawa, Bangkok =

Kampung Jawa, or Java Village, is a neighborhood of Sathorn, Bangkok that historically served as a home for the city's community of Javanese descent. The community was previously named the Ban Thawai Muslim Community, and is located on Rangnamkeang (Thai: ตรอกโรงน้ำแข็ง) 707 in Yan Nawa subdistrict.

== History ==
The Javanese residents descended from the palace gardeners brought to Bangkok during the reign of King Chulalongkorn. The residents established the Jawa Mosque and a cemetery.

As of 2016, approximately 3,000 residents lived in the neighborhood.

== Locations ==
=== Jawa Market ===
Jawa Market (Thai: ตลาดยะวา) A public market known for food and selling teak logs floated down the Chao Phraya River from the north. The market is the origin of gaeng khaek yawa (Thai: แกงแขกยะวา), a Siamese-Javanese curry of chicken and golden raisins, based in coconut.

=== Jawa Mosque ===
Jawa Mosque (Thai: มัสยิดยะวา; Javanese: ꦩꦱ꧀ꦗꦶꦢ꧀ꦗꦮ; Malay: مسجد جاوا) is a mosque in Sathorn, Bangkok, Thailand. The Mosque is the center of the Thai muslim community of Javanese descent.
