= Ton Son Mosque =

Mosque in Yai, Bangkok, Thailand

- มัสยิดต้นสน
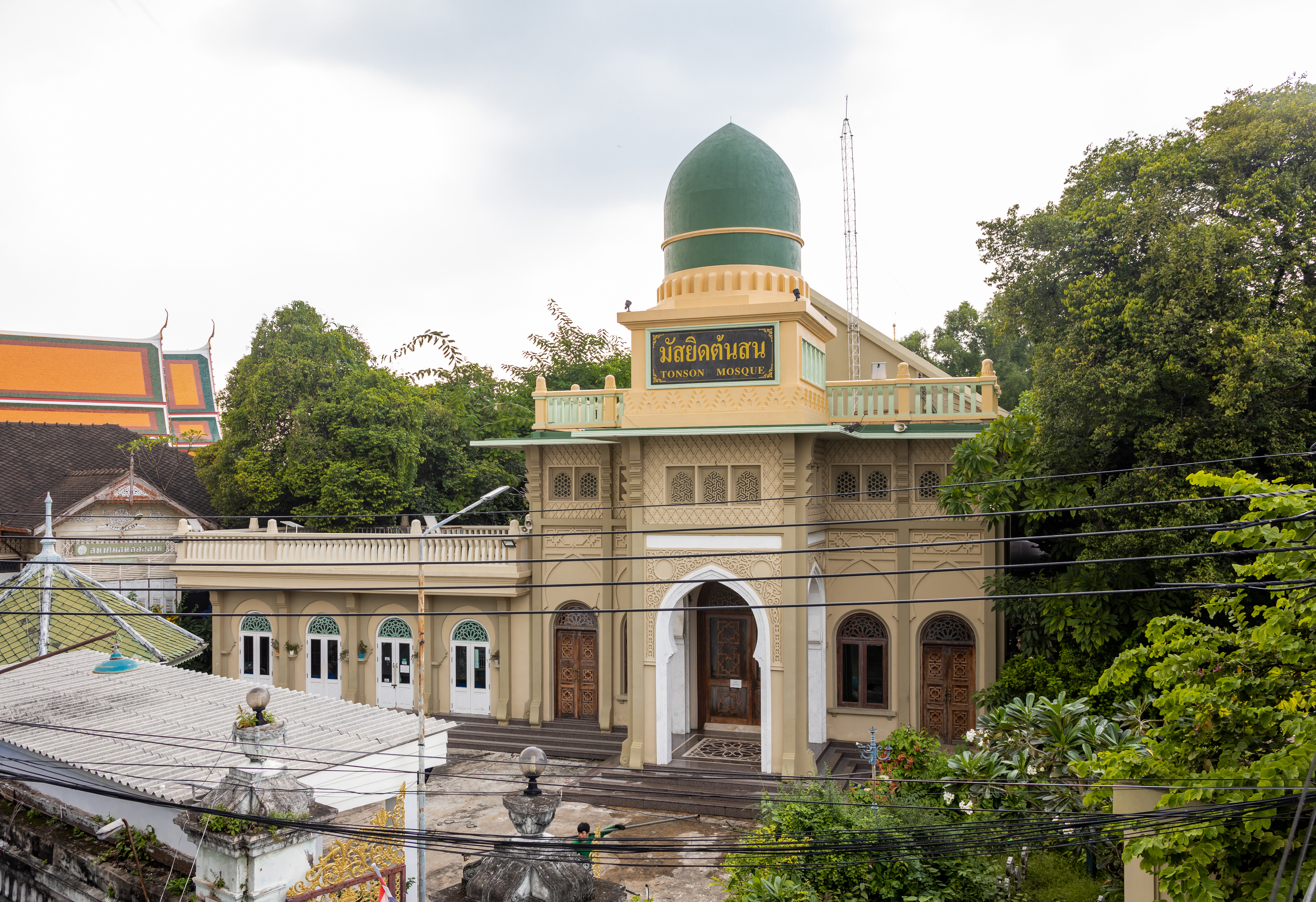

- Location of the mosque in Bangkok

Religion
- Affiliation: Sunni Islam
- Ecclesiastical or organizational status: Mosque
- Status: Active

Location
- Location: Bangkok Yai District, Bangkok
- Country: Thailand
- Interactive map of Ton Son Mosque
- Coordinates: 13°44′24″N 100°29′19″E

Architecture
- Type: Mosque architecture
- Style: Islamic
- Completed: 1688 CE

The Ton Son Mosque (Thai: มัสยิดต้นสน, lit. 'the Pine Tree Mosque') is a historic Sunni mosque, located on the left bank of Khlong Bangkok Yai canal, Wat Arun Subdistrict, Bangkok Yai District of Bangkok, in Thonburi, Thailand. The mosque is situated opposite the Wat Moli Lokayaram temple, and across the canal is Bang Luang Mosque.

== Overview ==
The ancient mosque was founded in the Ayutthaya era during the reign of King Narai in 1688 by Chao Phraya Ratchawangsanseni (Mahmud). It is considered the oldest mosque in Bangkok and Thailand. The first name was called "Kudi Yai" (กุฎีใหญ่), an abbreviation of "Kudi Bangkok Yai" (กุฎีบางกอกใหญ่). It was originally a teak house raised on a platform and roofed with terracotta tiles. The form of the architecture is similar to the hall in Buddhist monasteries. Worshippers in the Bangkok Yai area renovated it and changed the old structure to brick building during the reign of King Rama II. In 1952, the new building was transformed into a reinforced concrete building since the former architecture was too old to be rebuilt. The twin pine tree (Ton Son) was planted in front of the gate of the mosque's wall since the reign of King Rama III. And the name was officially changed to Ton Son Mosque.

Ton Son Mosque not only functions as a religious ground, but it also features ancient remains and relics that are worth seeing. At the outside of the building lies a graveyard of the chiefs of the Muslims in Thailand. Inside the mosque is the beautiful pulpit, called Mimbun, which has large pictures of Arabic calligraphy, a picture of the Kaaba and the plan of the mosque in Mecca, all using forms found in the period of King Taksin of Thonburi Kingdom.

== See also ==
- Islam in Thailand
- List of mosques in Thailand
