= Attaqwa Mosque =

Mosque in Chiang Mai, Thailand

- มัสยิดอัตตักวา
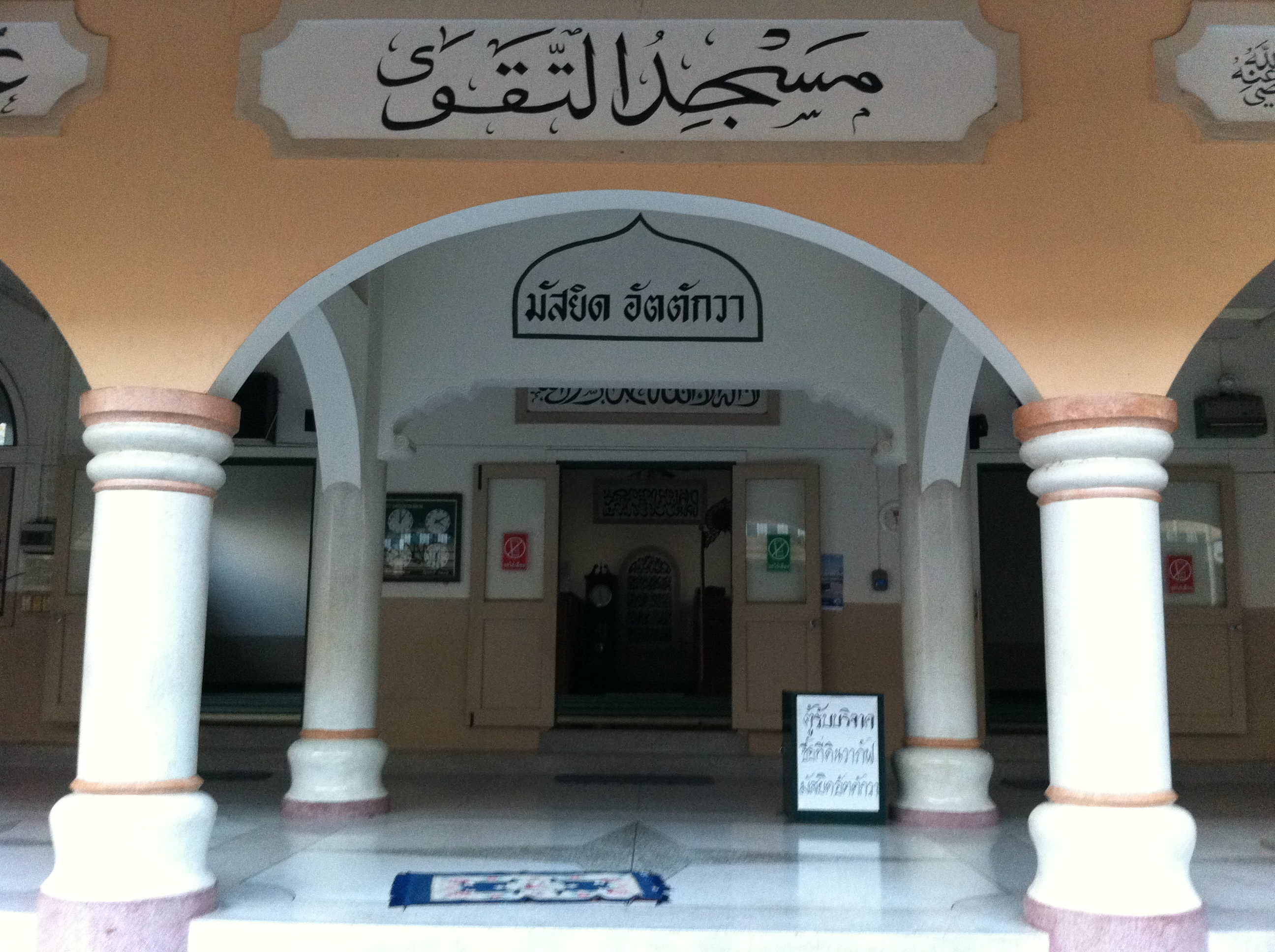

- Location of the mosque in Thailand

Religion
- Affiliation: Sunni Islam
- Ecclesiastical or organizational status: Mosque
- Status: Active

Location
- Location: Chiang Mai
- Country: Thailand
- Interactive map of Attaqwa Mosque
- Coordinates: 18°47′31.32″N 99°0′25.36″E

Architecture
- Type: Mosque architecture
- Groundbreaking: 1967
- Completed: 1969

The Attaqwa Mosque, sometimes spelled Attakkawa Mosque; Chinese: 訕巴契清真寺; pinyin: shànbāqìqīngzhēnsì, Thai: มัสยิดอัตตักวา; RTGS: Matsayit Attakkwa, and also known as the San Pa Koi Mosque (Thai: มัสยิดสันป่าข่อย; RTGS: Matsayit San Pa Khoi), is a mosque situated on the east side of the Ping River in Chiang Mai, is one of the seven Chinese mosques in the Chiang Mai Province.

== Overview ==
It was built in 1967, and finished in 1969 by a group of both Chinese and non-Chinese Muslims. The mosque also houses the first Islamic school in Chiang Mai, which maintains cultural and educational links with similar establishments in Kunming, in the Yunnan Province of China.

== See also ==
- Islam in Thailand
- List of mosques in Thailand
