= Talo Mano Mosque =

Mosque in Narathiwat, Thailand

- มัสยิดตะโละมาเนาะ
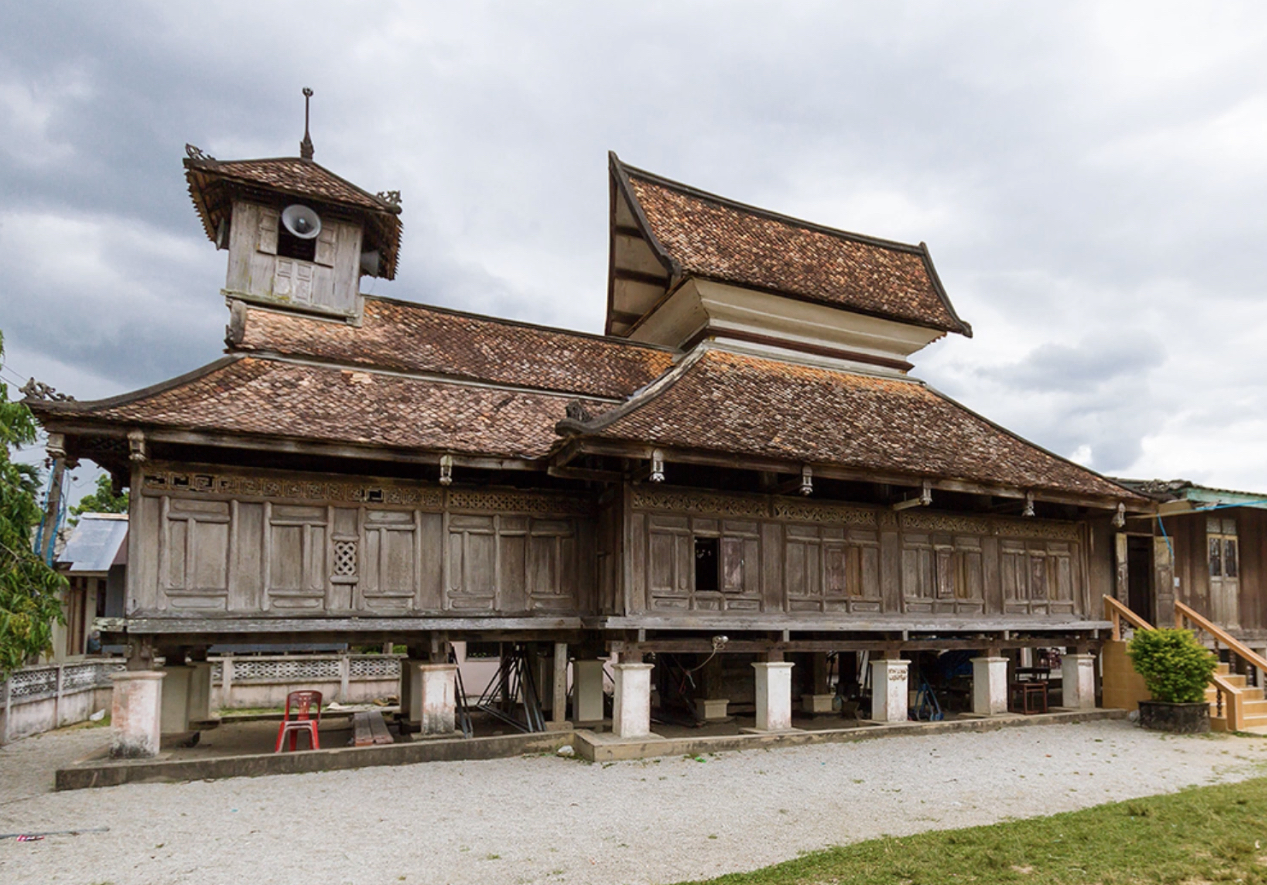

- Location of the mosque in Thailand

Religion
- Affiliation: Sunni Islam
- Ecclesiastical or organizational status: Mosque
- Status: Active

Location
- Location: Narathiwat
- Country: Thailand
- Interactive map of Talo Mano Mosque
- Coordinates: 6°29′03.3″N 101°39′22.0″E

Architecture
- Type: Mosque architecture
- Style: Malay
- Completed: 1634 CE
- Materials: Timber

The Talo Mano Mosque (Thai: มัสยิดตะโละมาเนาะ), also known as Al-Hussein Mosque (Thai: มัสยิดวาดี อัล ฮูเซ็น, RTGS: Matsayit Wadi An Husen) or 300 Years Mosque (Thai: มัสยิด 300 ปี, RTGS: Matsayit Sam Roi Pi) is one of the oldest mosques in Thailand. Located in Narathiwat, a southern province in Thailand, it is in use today by the large Muslim community in the area. The mosque was built in 1634 to serve the newly settled Muslim community during that time. It is the oldest wooden mosque in Thailand.

== History ==
The mosque dates back to the Pattani Kingdom, when it was ruled by a sultan. The villagers in that area who were both Muslims and Buddhists built the mosque in 1634. They cooperated in the construction of the mosque. Legend states that during the war between the Ayutthaya Kingdom and the Pattani Kingdom, a young woman of a village in the Pattani Kingdom was fleeing from the war. She was the keeper of the village's Quran and fled with it in her hands. Upon fleeing, she fell into a small valley. Rescued by the villagers in that area, she surprised them as she had the Quran tight in her hands. The villagers so then decided to build the Mosque after the war ended. Another legend states that the mosque was built by Wan Husein Az-Sanawi, a teacher who migrated to the Pattani Kingdom, in 1624. The hand-written Quran and the construction plan of the mosque are kept in the mosque itself.

== Architecture ==
The mosque combines several architectural styles from the Chinese, Thais, and the Malays. The mosque was built with wood from the merbau tree and an belian tree. Because nails were not invented at that time, wedges were used instead to hold the wood into place. Original roofing was made of palm tree leaves and it was later changed to terracotta tiles. The mosque consists of two buildings. The smaller building is where the mihrab is located and has three layers of roof. It is also where the Chinese-style minaret is located. The bigger building has more of Thai architectural influence with the Thai-style gable. The walls of both buildings has etchings of Thai/Chinese/Malay designs and patterns.

== Ceremonies ==
Most ceremonies held in the mosque are strictly Islamic ceremonies. Although it also serves as a community centre, it still must be treated as a mosque.

== Renovations ==
To prepare for the ASEAN community, the 300 year mosque received a 200-million Thai Baht fund from the government to renovate the mosque in early 2014. The plan will be implemented by the Southern Border Provinces Administrative Center. Renovations includes renovating the mosque, improving surrounding landscapes, and adding functions to the mosque (community center). With the renovation, the mosque will hopefully attract more tourists.

== See also ==
- Islam in Thailand
- List of mosques in Thailand
