= Chin Haw =

Group of Chinese people in Thailand

Chin Haw People
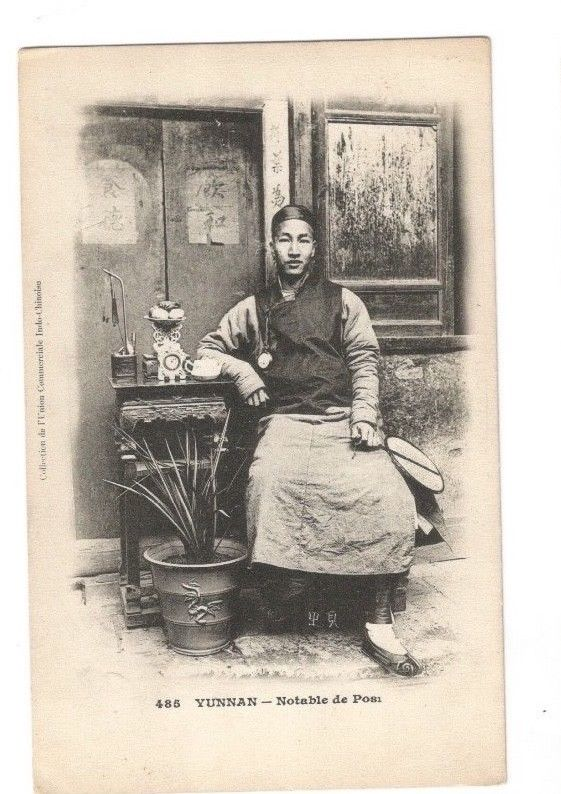

Regions with significant populations
- Thailand: Unknown
- Laos: Unknown
- Burma: Unknown

Languages
- Southwestern Mandarin; Thai; Lan Na

Religion
- Chinese Folk Religion; Mahayana Buddhism; Confucianism; Taoism; Islam; Christianity

Related ethnic groups
- Han people; Hui people

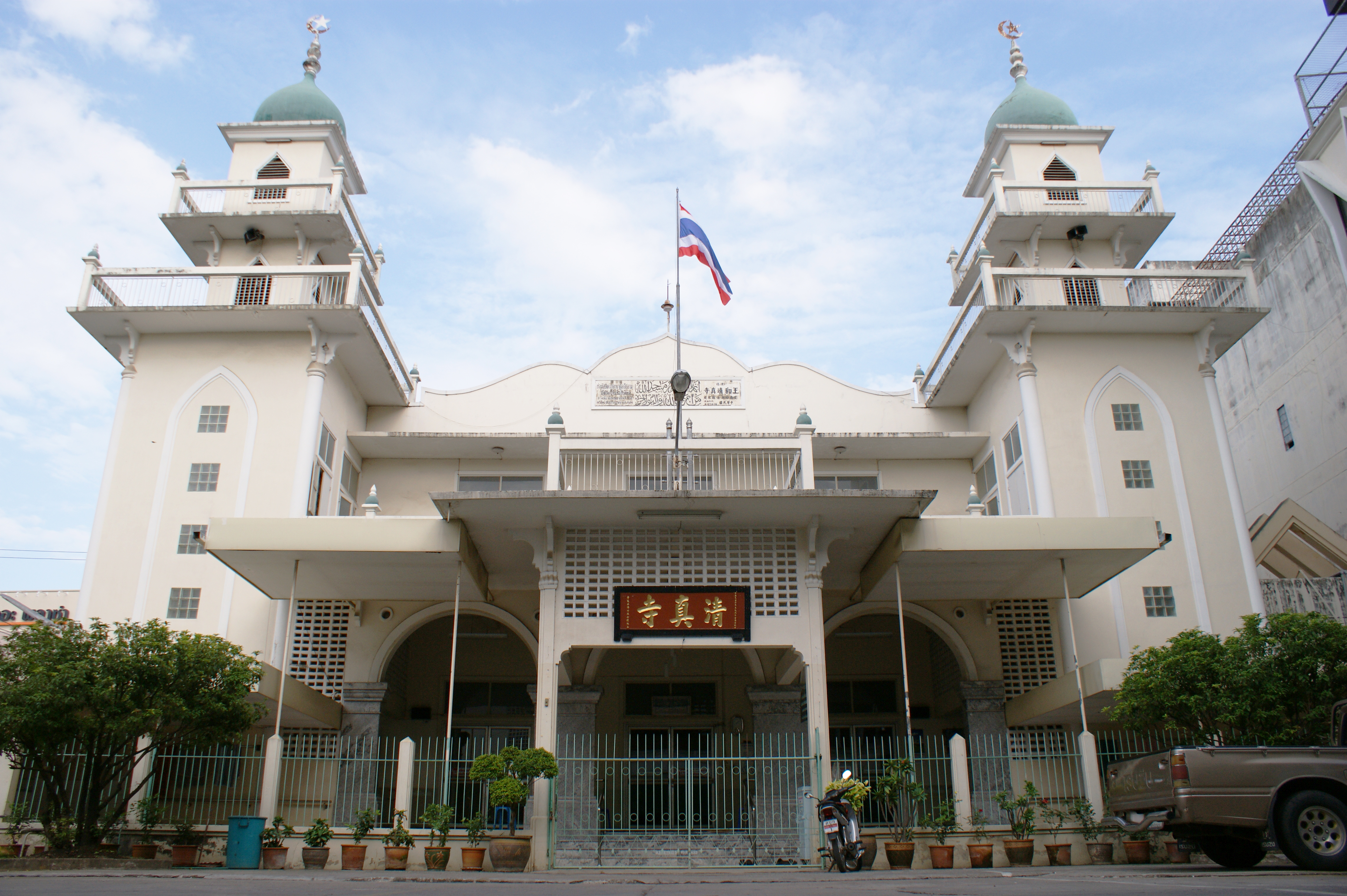
Ban Ho Mosque in Chiang Mai province

The Chin Haw or Chin Ho (Chinese: 秦霍; pinyin: Qín huò; Thai: จีนฮ่อ, RTGS: Chin Ho), also known locally as Yunnanese (Chinese: 雲南人, Thai: คนยูนนาน), are Chinese people who migrated to Thailand via Myanmar or Laos. Most of them were originally from Yunnan, a southern province of China. They speak Southwestern Mandarin and are generally culturally distinct from the broader Thai Chinese population, which is predominantly of southeastern Chinese origin. A significant and historically prominent component of the Chin Haw population consists of Hui people from Yunnan.

== Migration ==
Generally, the Chin Haw can be divided into three groups, according to the time of their migration.

1. In the nineteenth century, the Qing army sent troops to suppress the rebellion in Yunnan, known as the Panthay Rebellion, which caused up to 1,000,000 lives lost - both civilians and soldiers. During this time, many people fled to the Shan state in Burma, then to northern Thailand.
2. The Panthay Chinese merchants who traded between Yunnan, Burma, and Lan Na from their base in the Wa States. Some of them settled down along this trade route.
3. After the Chinese Communist Revolution in 1949, remnants of the nationalist Kuomintang army fled to Burma and later established Kuomintang Chinese communities in Thailand

== Religion ==
The majority are Han Chinese and follow Chinese folk religion or Buddhism. Approximately one-third are Muslim, also known as Hui people or Hui Muslim.

== Activities ==
The Chin Haw have traditionally been itinerant in their lifestyle, conducting long-distance caravan trade throughout the Thai-Burma-Laos frontier, southeast China, and northern Vietnam.

They have engaged in the heroin trade. Ma Hseuh-fu, from Yunnan province, was one of the most prominent Chin Haw heroin drug lords. His other professions included trading in tea and being a hotelier.

The Muslim Chin Haw are the same ethnic group as the Panthay in Burma, who are also descendants of Hui Muslims from Yunnan province, China.

== See also ==
- Baan Haw Mosque
- Attaqwa Mosque
- Kokang people
- Kuomintang in Burma and spillover into Thailand
- Panthays
- Thai Chinese
