= Jawa Mosque =

Mosque in Sathorn, Bangkok, Thailand

- มัสยิดยะวา
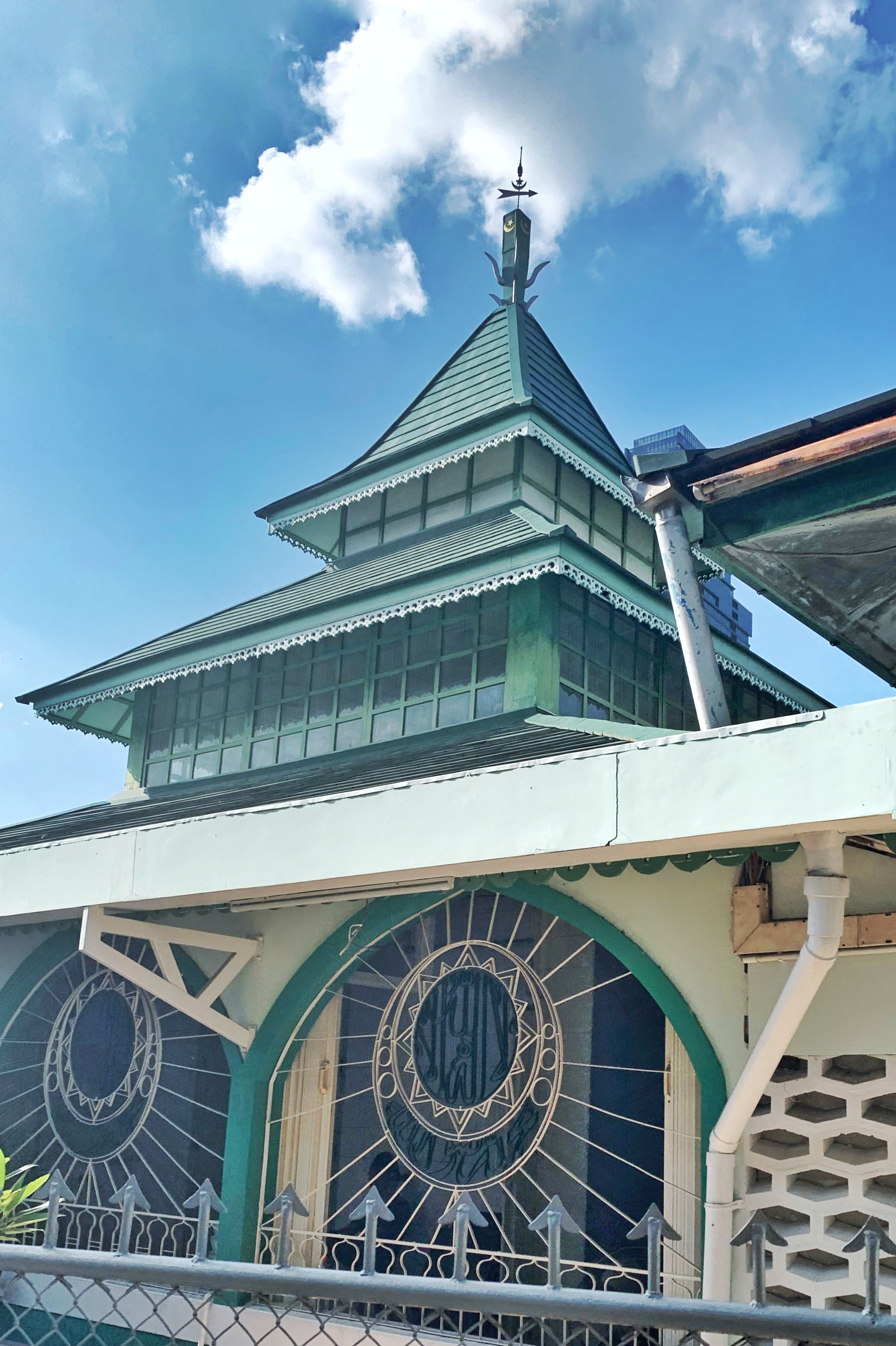

Religion
- Affiliation: Islam

Location
- Municipality: Sathon, Bangkok
- Country: Thailand
- Interactive map of Jawa Mosque
- Coordinates: 13.7158°N 100.5221°E

Architecture
- Type: mosque
- Established: 1906

Jawa Mosque (Thai: มัสยิดยะวา; Javanese: ꦩꦱ꧀ꦗꦶꦢ꧀ꦗꦮ; Malay: مسجد جاوا; Indonesian: Masjid Jawa) is a mosque in Kampung Jawa, Sathorn, Bangkok, Thailand. The Mosque is the center of the Thai muslim community of Javanese descent.
