= Islam in Thailand =

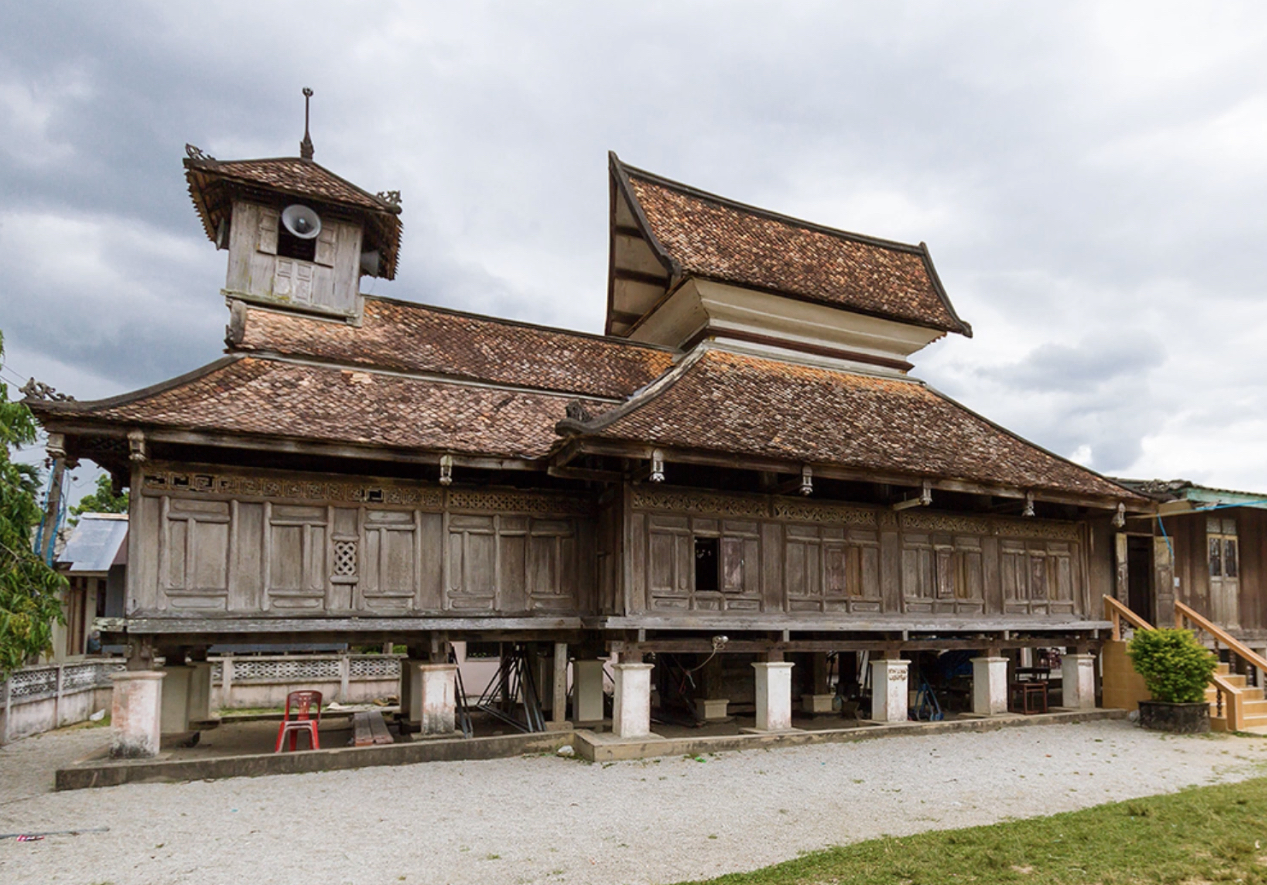
Talo Mano Mosque is one of the oldest mosques in Thailand, built in c. 1634

Islam has a historical presence in Thailand, where Thai Muslims are the largest religious minority in the country. Figures vary according to different sources. Some reports mention a figure as high as 5.4% of Thailand's population. Back in 2022, USA government sources suggested a 5.4% figure. A 2023 Pew Research Center survey suggested a 7% figure. According to a Thailand government source, as of 2024 there are approximately 7.5 million Thai Muslims in the kingdom, or approximately about 12% of the overall population.

Most Thai Muslims are Sunni Muslims, although Thailand has a diverse population with diverse background.

== Demographics and geography ==
A vast majority of the country's Muslims are found in Thailand's four southernmost provinces of Satun, Yala, Pattani and Narathiwat, where they make up majority of the population. However, a Thai Ministry of Foreign Affairs' research indicates that only 18 percent of Thai Muslims live in those four provinces. There are also significant minority of Muslims in other southern provinces such as Songkhla, Krabi, Trang, Phatthalung and Phuket. In Bangkok, large Muslim populations are found in districts such as Nong Chok, Min Buri and Bang Rak.

According to the National Statistics Office, in 2015 census, Muslims in Southern Thailand made up 24 percent of the total population in the region, while less than three percent in other parts of the country.

== History ==
Muslim merchant communities resided in Thailand as early as the 9th century.

In early modern Thailand, Muslims from the Coromandel Coast served as eunuchs in the Thai palace and court. Thailand, as Siam, was known for religious tolerance, and there were Muslims working for the Siamese Royal Governments throughout the eras. This culture of tolerance in Siam and later Thailand resulted in the great diversity of Islam in Thailand.

Malay separatism in South Thailand is mostly a war based on ethnicity, as Malays in the region have sought to separate from Thailand, although irredentist Muslim groups are involved in the conflict.

== Ethnicity and identity ==
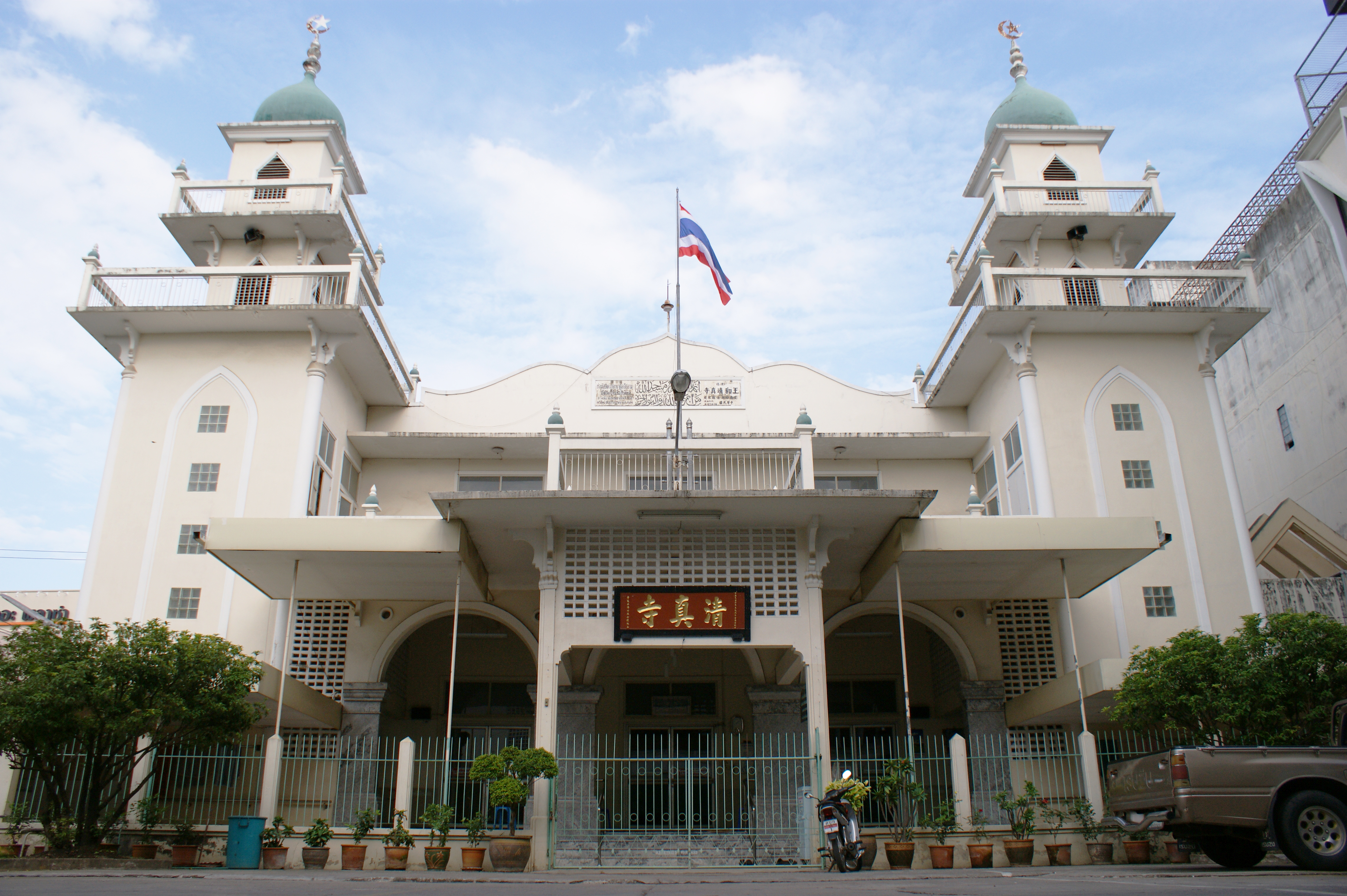
The Ban Ho Mosque of the Chin Haw.

Thailand's Muslim population is diverse, with ethnic groups having migrated from as far as China, Pakistan, Cambodia, Bangladesh, Philippines, Malaysia, and Indonesia, as well as including ethnic Thais, while about two-thirds of Muslims in Thailand are Thai Malays.

=== Thai Muslims ===
Many Thai Muslims are ethnically and linguistically Thai, who are either hereditary Muslims, Muslims by intermarriage, or recent converts to the faith. Ethnic Thai Muslims live mainly in the central and southern provinces - varying from entire Muslim communities to mixed settlements.

Former Commander-in-Chief of the Royal Thai Army General Sonthi Boonyaratglin is an example of an indigenous Thai Muslim. Sonthi is of remote Persian ancestry. His ancestor, Sheikh Ahmad of Qom, was an Iranian expatriate trader who lived in the Ayutthaya Kingdom for 26 years. Many Thais, including those of the Bunnag and Ahmad-Chula families trace their ancestry back to him. Sri Sulalai was a princess of the royal family of the Sultanate of Singora. Rama II of Siam took her as a concubine.

In 1946, Prince Bhumibol Adulyadej and King Ananda Mahidol toured the Tonson Mosque.

=== Malay Muslims ===
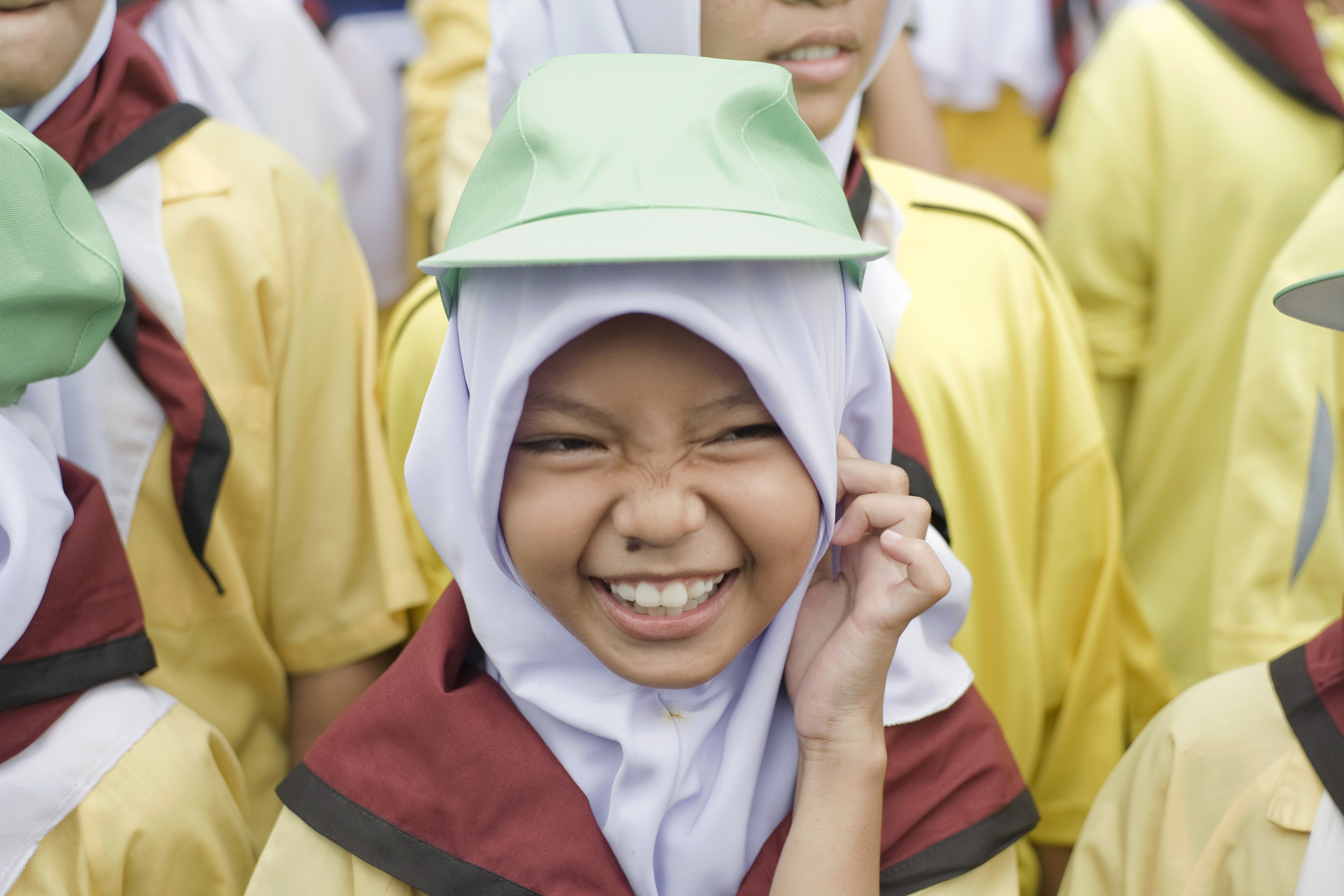
A Thai Malay girl

In the three southernmost border provinces, the vast majority of the local Muslim population is predominantly Malay, amounting to about 80 percent of the region's population. Thai Malays speak Kelantan-Pattani Malay, which is different from the Malay language.

The high number of Malay origin inhabitants in the southern region is due to the historical nature of the area, which contains parts of the Patani Kingdom, an Islamic Malay kingdom established approximately 1500 CE, but later annexed to Siam since the early Ayutthaya Kingdom. Similarly, there is an ethnic Thai minority in northern Malaysia.

=== Chinese Muslims ===
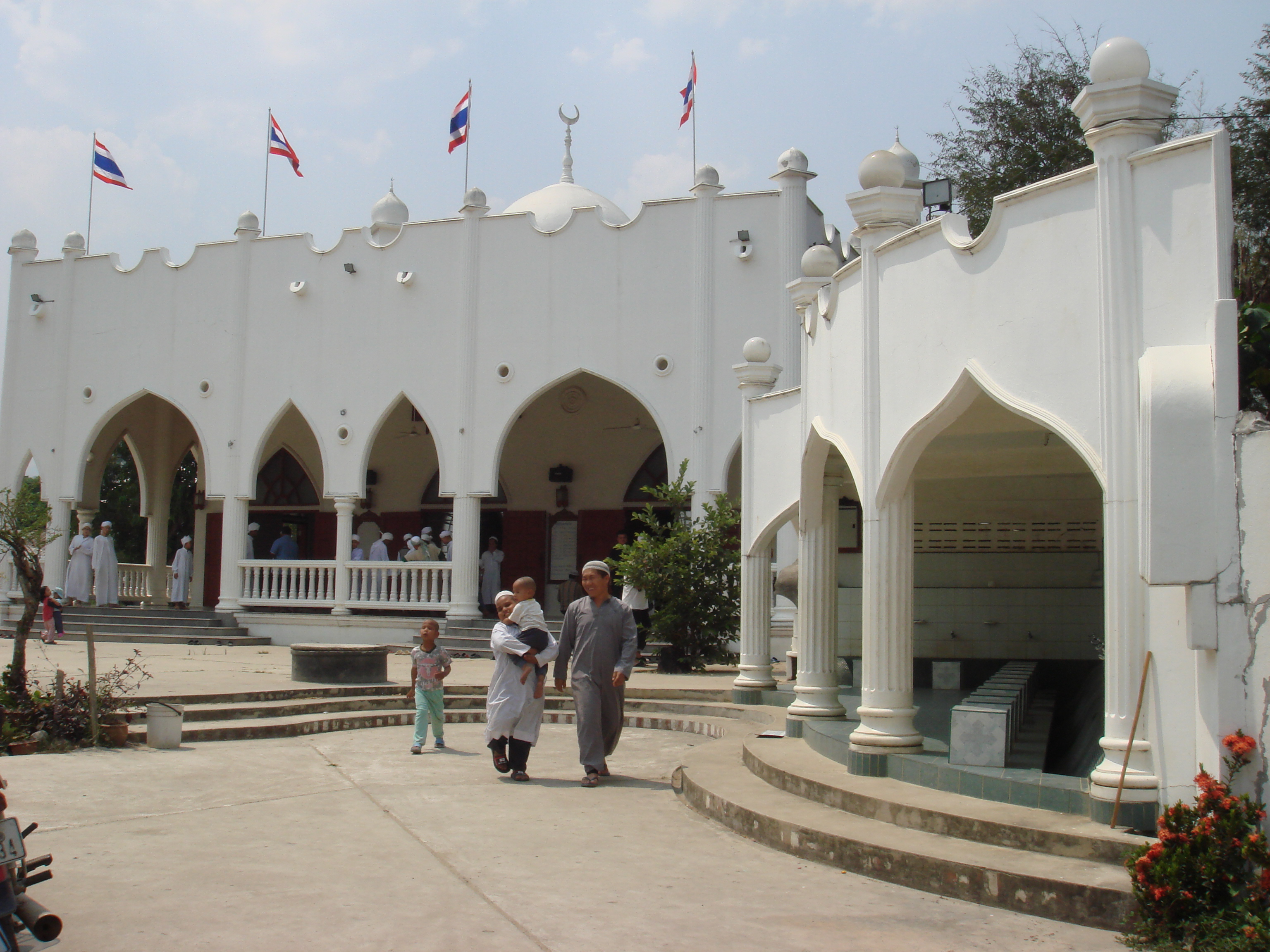
Chin Haw in a mosque in Pai District, Northern Thailand

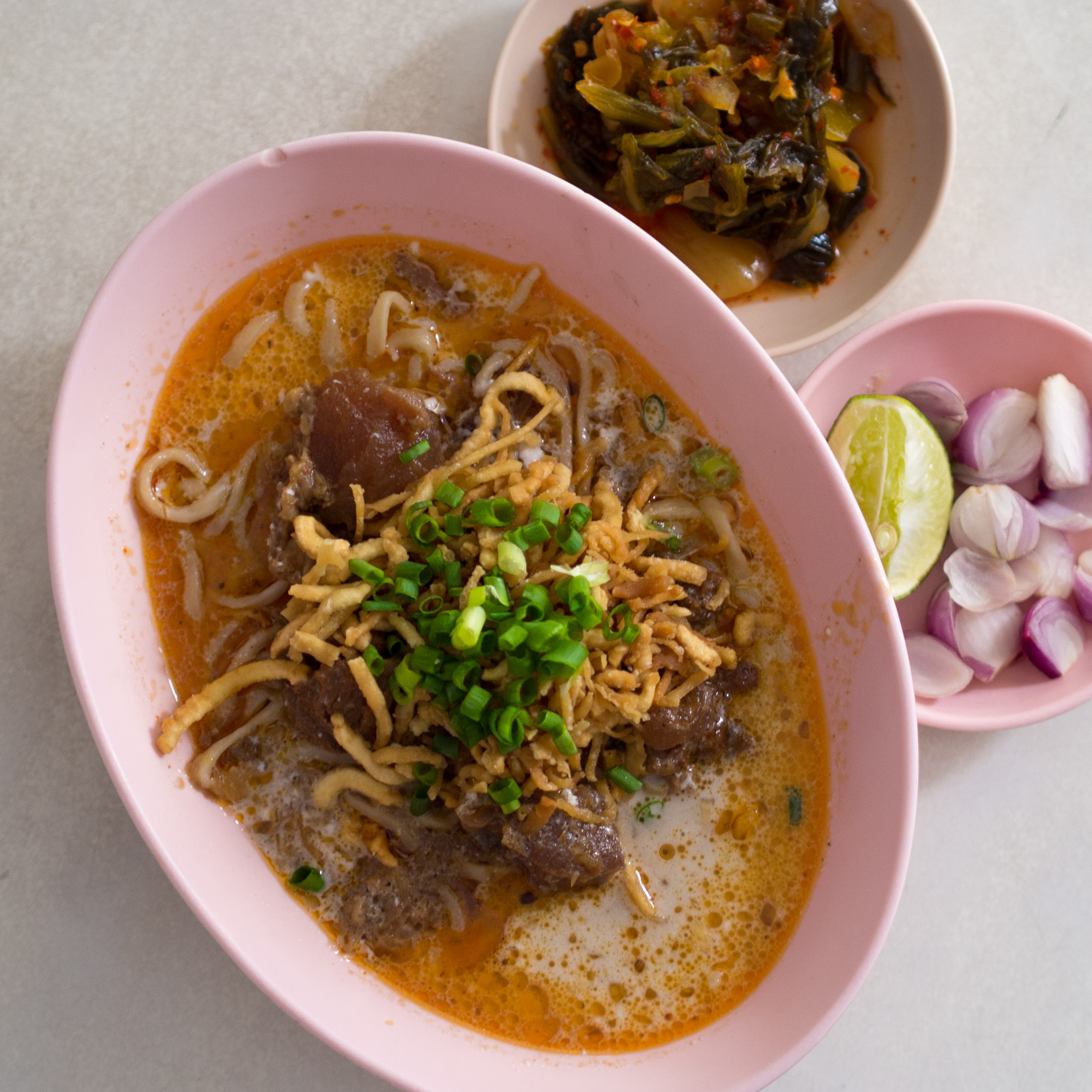
Khao soi at a Chin Haw restaurant in Chiang Mai

In the far north, as well as in select central and southern urban areas, there are pockets of Thai Muslims of Hui (ethnic Chinese Muslim) origin. Most Chinese Muslims belong to a group of people called Chin Haw in Thai, although most Chin Haw are not Muslims. Some historians believe that the name Chin Haw can be explained to be a combination of "Chin" (China) and "Ho" (Hui). The Chin Haw thus can be seen as traders and émigrés who carried with them Hui traditions from China. One of the best known Chinese mosques is Ban Ho Mosque in Chiang Mai Province.

=== Cham Muslims ===
Cham Muslims, originally from Vietnam and Cambodia, have resided in Bangkok and southern Thailand near Malaysia, where they have assimilated with local Thai Malays, since the 18th century. Like most Chams in Cambodia, they follow Sunni Islam. They trace their origins to the fall of the Champa city-state in central and southern Vietnam and later fled to the Kingdom of Ayutthaya in the 15th to 16th centuries and the 19th century. Also recent migration in the 1970s following the fall of the Cambodian government to the Khmer Rouge by Pol Pot and the subsequent Cambodian genocide.

=== Burmese Muslims ===
Ethnic groups including the Rohingya are found in Thailand's refugee camps, rural fishing villages, as well as in many small towns and cities close to the Myanmar border.

As well as being home to many Chinese Muslims, Northern Thailand is home to many Burmese and mixed Chinese-Burmese or Pakistani-Burmese peoples. The Burmese Muslim community lives along the border of Thailand with Myanmar and are known as 'Bamroon' who speak the Burmese language.

=== Other Asian Muslim groups ===
Other groups include West Asians such as Arabs and South Asians (especially Indians, Pakistanis and Bangladeshis) and Indonesian Muslims, especially Bugis, Javanese and Minangkabau.

According to a 1685 account of a Persian diplomat as well as notes of the French traveller Guy Tachard, there was a substantial Persian Shi'i community in Thailand at the time, with ritual ta'ziyeh performances subsidised by the king. There are Muslims of Persian origin that reside in the Bangkok area.

== Traditions of Thai Muslims ==
Generally believers of the Islamic faith in Thailand follow certain customs and traditions associated with traditional Islam influenced by Sufism.

For Thai Muslims, like their co-religionists in Southeast Asia's other Buddhist-majority countries, Mawlid is a symbolic reminder of the historical presence of Islam in the country. It also represents an annual opportunity to reaffirm Muslims' status as Thai citizens and their allegiance to the monarchy.

The Islamic faith in Thailand, often reflects Sufi beliefs and practices, as in other Asian countries like Bangladesh, India, Pakistan, Indonesia and Malaysia. The Ministry of Culture's Islamic Department gives awards to Muslims who have contributed to the promotion and development of Thai life in their roles as citizens, as educators and as social workers. In Bangkok, the Ngarn Mawlid Klang main festival is a vibrant showcase for the Thai Muslim community and their lifestyles.

== Places of worship ==
According to the National Statistics Office of Thailand in 2007, the country had 3,494 mosques, with the largest number, as 636 mosques are in Pattani Province. According to the Religious Affairs Department (RAD), 99 percent of the mosques are associated with Sunni Islam with the remaining one percent Shi'i Islam.

== Governance and education ==
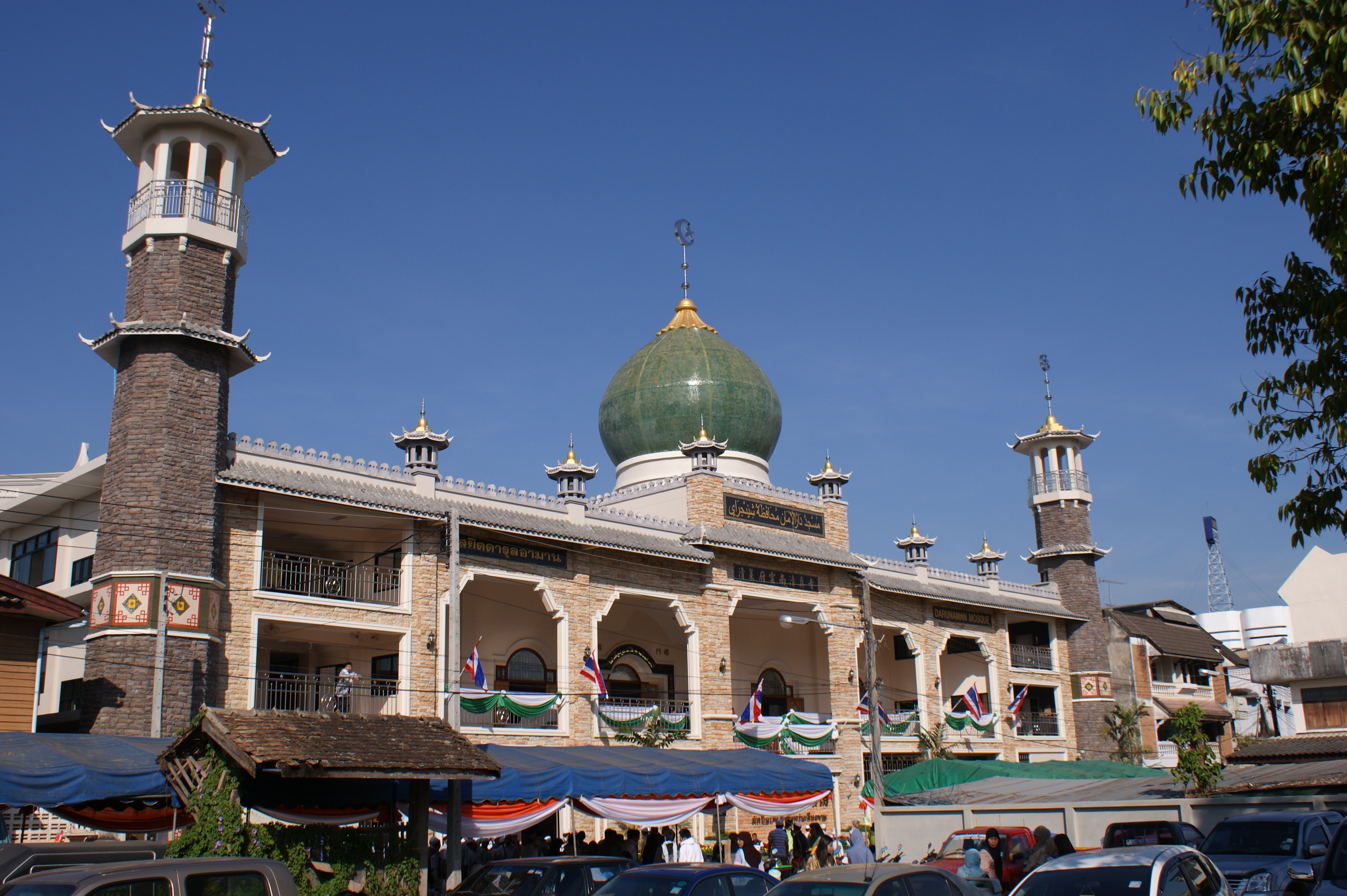
The Darunaman Mosque.

Chularatchamontri (จุฬาราชมนตรี) is the title of Shaykh al-Islām (Head of Islam) in Thailand. The title was first used in the Ayutthaya Kingdom when King Songtham (1611–1628) appointed Sheikh Ahmad to the office. Pursuant to the current Islamic Organ Administration Act, BE 2540 (1997), the Chularatchamontri is appointed by the King upon advice of the Prime Minister. He has the authority to administer all Islamic affairs in the nation and to provide advice on Islamic affairs to governmental agencies. The Chularatchamontri vacates his office at his death, resignation, or removal by the King on the advice of the Prime Minister. Islamic law is implemented in the four southern provinces with Muslim majorities, where it applies only to Muslims in cases concerning the family and inheritance.

Under and headed by the Chularatchamontri is the Central Islamic Council of Thailand (คณะกรรมการกลางอิสลามแห่งประเทศไทย) (CICOT) (กอท.), consisting of at least five councillors appointed by the King. The CICOT advises the Minister of Education and the Minister of Interior on Islamic matters. Provincial Islamic Councils (คณะกรรมการอิสลามประจำจังหวัด) exist in provinces with substantial Muslim minorities. There are other links between the government and the Muslim community, including funding for Islamic educational institutions, the construction of larger mosques, and aid to Thai Muslims on pilgrimage to Mecca, with Bangkok and Hat Yai being key gateways.

Thailand maintains several hundred Islamic schools at the primary and secondary levels, as well as Islamic banks such as the Islamic Bank of Thailand, shops, and other institutions. Much of packaged food in the country is also tested and certified halal if applicable.

== See also ==
- South Thailand insurgency
- Islam by country
- List of mosques in Thailand
- Pattani Kingdom
- Hidayatuddeneyah Mosque
