= Arun Amarin Road =

Road in Bangkok, Thailand

Coordinates: 13.767417°N 100.484926°E

- Thanon Arun Amarin
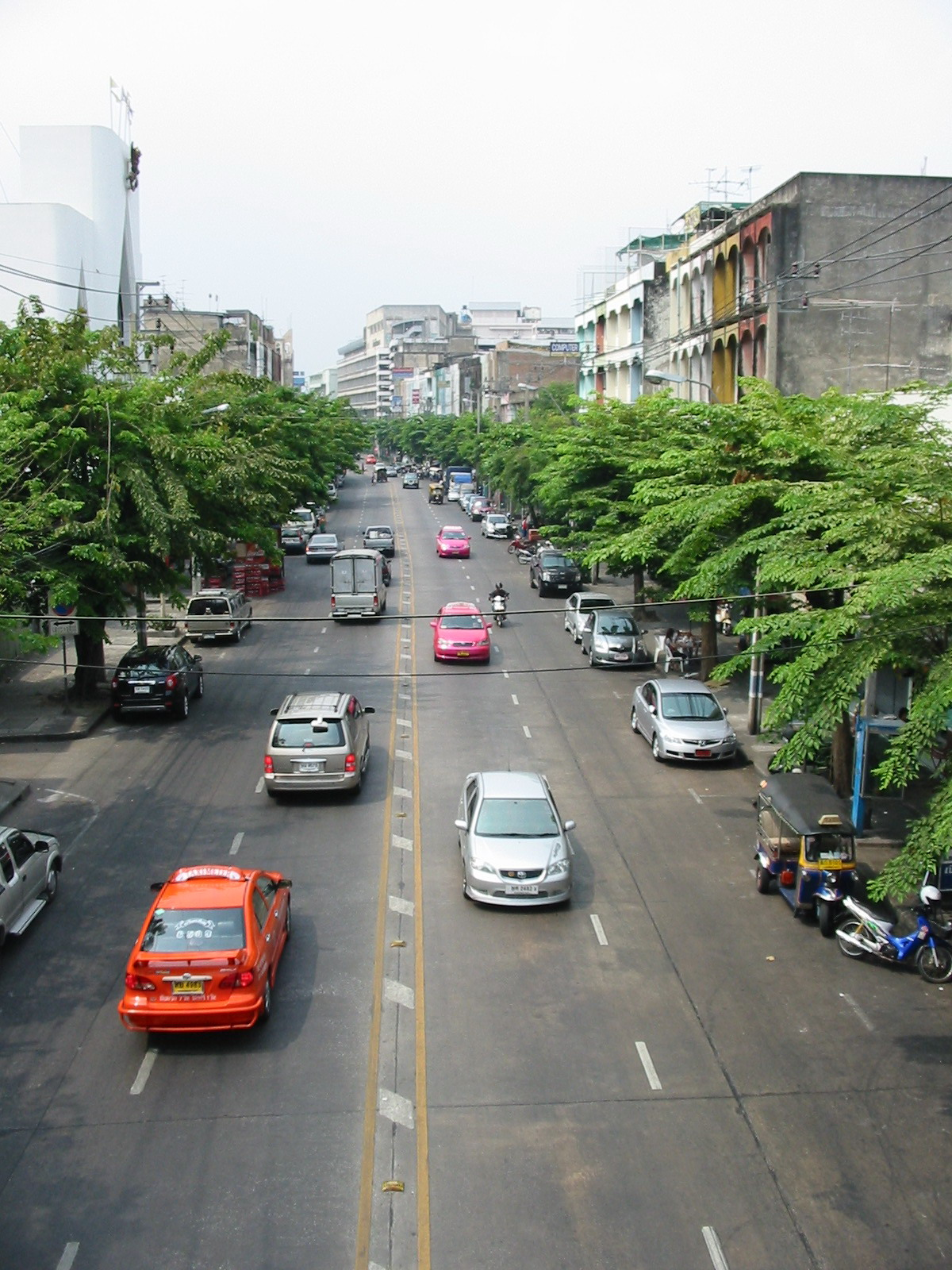
- Arun Amarin Road in 2008
- Native name: ถนนอรุณอมรินทร์ (Thai)
- Former names: Second road, Somdet Chao Phraya Road
- Namesake: Wat Arun and Wat Amarinthraram

Construction
- Commissioned: November 11th, 1930

Arun Amarin Road (Thai: ถนนอรุณอมรินทร์, pronounced [tʰā.nǒn ʔā.rūn ʔā(m).mā.rīn]) is a road in Thunburi side (west side of Chao Phraya River) of Bangkok.

Cut as the second of the eleven new roads in Thonburi Province (now the Thonburi side) after the inauguration of the Memorial Bridge in 1932, it starts beside Suksanari School in the area of Thon Buri's Wat Kanlaya, where it intersects with Prajadhipok Road opposite Wongwian Lek, near the foot of Memorial and Phra Pok Klao Bridges.

The road then runs past the entrances to many important places of worship, including Wat Buppharam, Wat Kanlayanamit, and Bang Luang Mosque, before crossing Khlong Bangkok Yai via Anutin Sawat Bridge, passing Ton Son Mosque and Wat Molilokkayaram in the area of Bangkok Yai's Wat Arun.

It continues until it passes in front of Thonburi Palace and Wat Arun at Wang Doem Junction, where it intersects with Wang Doem Road, which leads to Bangkok Yai Police Station and Wat Hong Rattanaram.

Arun Amarin Road then runs past the Royal Thai Navy Convention Center, the entrance to Wat Nak Klang, Taweethapisek School, and Rajdamnern Technological College (Soi Itsaraphap 42), as well as Wat Khruea Wan.

After crossing Khlong Mon, the road enters Bangkok Noi's Siri Rat area, running alongside the Royal Thai Naval Dockyard and Wat Phraya Tham, up to its intersection with Soi Saeng Suksa (Soi Itsaraphap 44) at Ban Khamin Junction. It then passes the entrance to Wat Rakhang, Wang Lang Market, and Siriraj Hospital at Siriraj Intersection, where it meets Wang Lang Road (formerly Pran Nok Road).

Next, it crosses Khlong Bangkok Noi via Arun Amarin Bridge, near Wat Amarinthraram, Thon Buri railway station, and the National Museum of Royal Barges. The road also enters the Arun Amarin area.

The last stretch crosses Somdet Phra Pinklao Road at Arun Amarin Intersection, between Pata Pinklao Department Store and the foot of Phra Pinklao Bridge. It then enters Bang Phlat's Bang Yi Khan area and continues until it ends at the Chao Phraya River under Rama VIII Bridge, beside Rama VIII Park, covering a total distance of 4,900 m (16,076 ft).

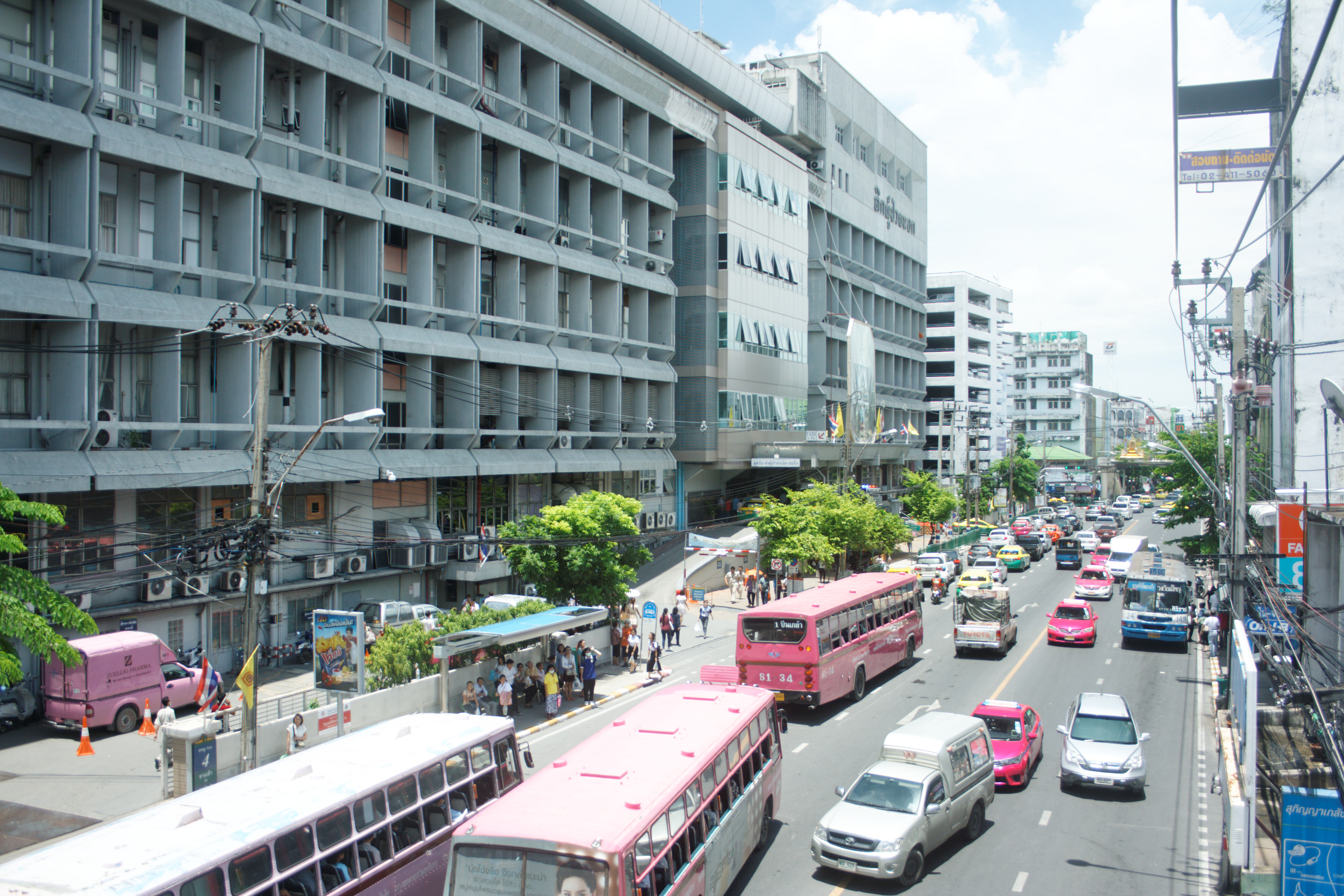
The road passing by Siriraj Hospital in 2016

The section between the Royal Thai Navy Convention Center and beside Suksanari School is considered an extension of the original road; it was completed and opened in 1997. This section is often unofficially called "New Arun Amarin Road" (ถนนอรุณอมรินทร์ตัดใหม่). The footbridge in front of Wat Kalayanamit was built by the temple in 2017 and handed over to the Bangkok Metropolitan Administration (BMA) in 2018.

An overpass to alleviate traffic from the Royal Thai Naval Dockyard, crossing Siriraj Intersection and Arun Amarin Bridge, is currently under construction and expected to open its first phase in April 2021.

Arun Amarin Road is regarded as the road mostly parallel to Itsaraphap Road in terms of distance.

Arun Amarin Intersection, where it meets Somdet Phra Pinklao Road, is a four-way intersection that has existed since 1973, along with the opening of Phra Pinklao Bridge. It originally featured a steel-framed overpass, which was later demolished to make way for a ramp of the Borommaratchachonnani Elevated Highway in 1995.
