= Royal Thai Navy Convention Hall =

Royal Thai Navy Convention Center in Bangkok, Thailand

Royal Thai Navy Convention Center
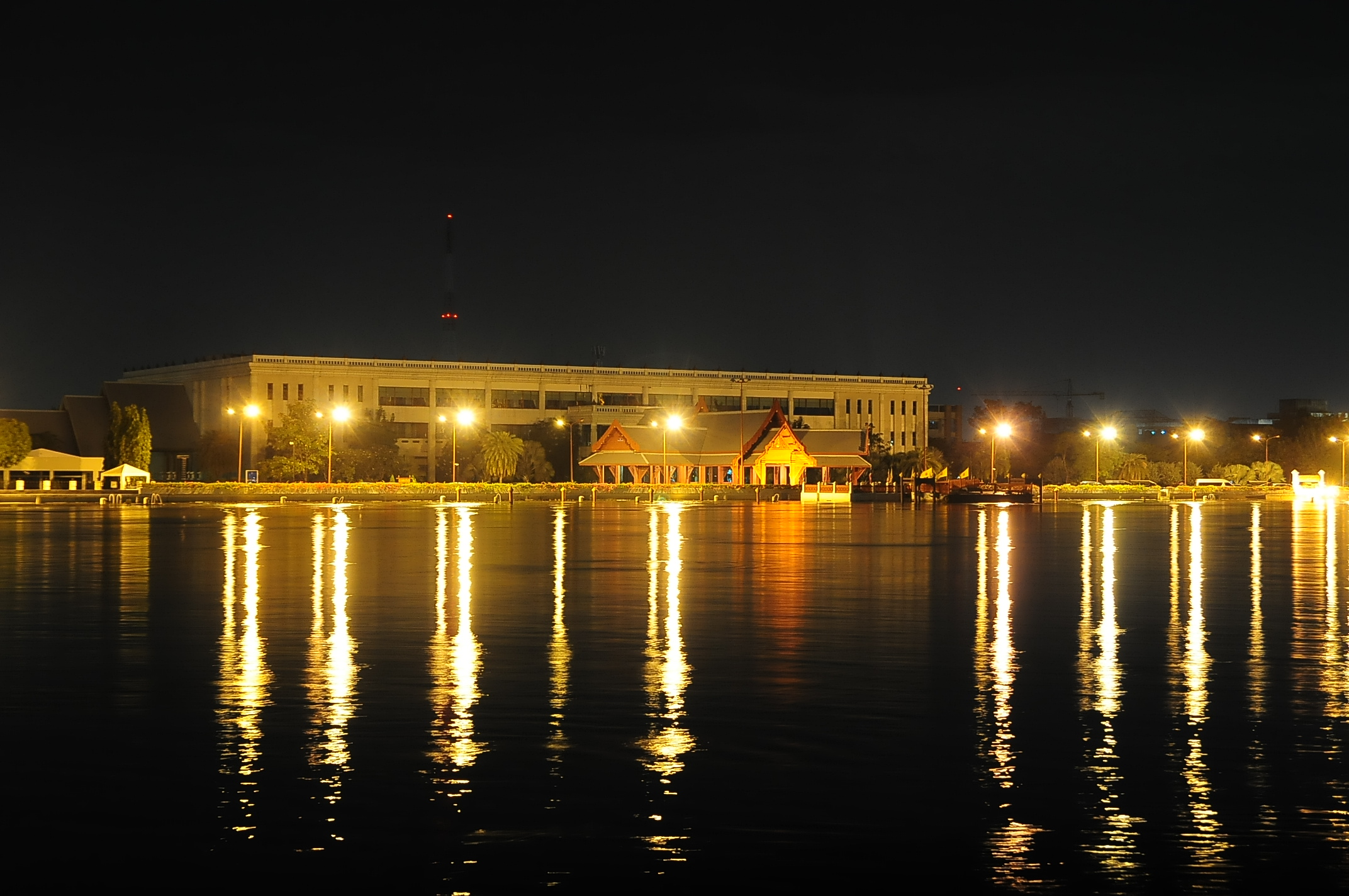
- Royal Thai Navy Convention Center in nighttime
- Interactive map of Royal Thai Navy Convention Center
- Address: Arun Amarin Road, Wat Arun Sub-District, Bangkok Yai District, Bangkok 10600, Thailand
- Location: west bank of Chao Phraya River, Bangkok, Thailand
- Coordinates: 13°44′47.52″N 100°29′13.03″E
- Owner: Royal Thai Navy (RTN)

Construction
- Opened: September 24, 2003

Website
- navyhall.com

Royal Thai Navy Convention Center or Royal Thai Navy Convention Hall (Thai: หอประชุมกองทัพเรือ) is a convention center under Royal Thai Navy (RTN) in Wat Arun Sub-District, Bangkok Yai District, Bangkok, Thailand.

== History & service ==
Royal Thai Navy Convention Center was built in 2002 in the area of Naval Military Police in the adjacent a historic building, Royal Thai Naval Institute for the APEC 2003 to hold a grand dinner for the participants and as a viewing facility for the Royal Barge Procession.

This convention center is ideally located on west bank of the Chao Phraya River. It is opposite the Grand Palace, Tha Tian and Nagaraphirom Park, the most desired tourist locations in Bangkok. It currently provides services for catering gala dinners, exhibitions, conferences, seminars, incentives, banquets, receptions, workshops, party of various companies and private parties of all kinds-large or small.

== Transportation ==
- BMTA bus: route 19, 57, 710
- Chao Phraya Ferry: Tha Tian Pier (N8) to Wat Arun Pier (round trip)
- Chao Phraya Express Boat: Wat Arun Pier

== Nearby places ==
- Wat Arun (Temple of Dawn)
- Taweethapisek School
- Wat Khruea Wan Worawihan
- Panichayakarnrajdamnern Technological College
- Phra Racha Wang Derm (Thonburi Palace)
- Royal Thai Navy Headquarters
