= Buathong =

Thai surname

Buathong is a Thai surname. Notable people with the surname include:

- Chakrit Buathong (born 1985), Thai footballer
- Sitang Buathong (born 1962), Thai actress and internet personality
- Watchara Buathong (born 1993), Thai footballer
