= Taweethapisek School =

- โรงเรียนทวีธาภิเศก
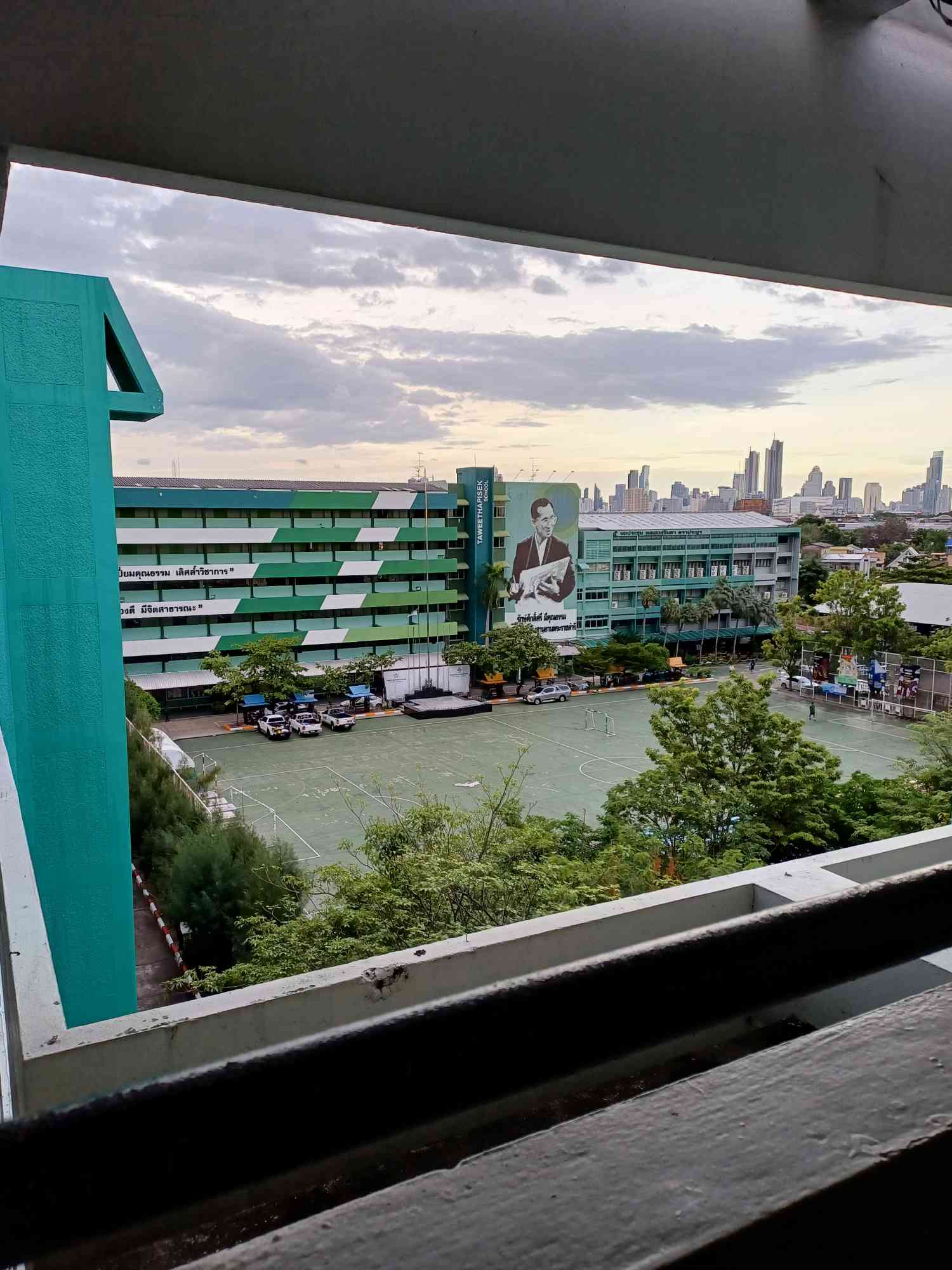
- Surachai Ronnarong Building & General Suchinda Kraprayoon Hall Building (view from Thep Sittinayok Building)

Location
- 505/5 Soi Itsaraphap 42, Itsaraphap Rd. Bangkok Yai District, Bangkok, 10600; Thailand; 13.745253°N 100.482700°E

Information
- Former name: Wat Arun Ratchawararam School
- Type: Public high school
- Motto: Thai: ลูกทวีธา มีศักดิ์ศรี มีน้ำใจ มีคุณธรรม (Thaweetha children have dignity, are thoughtful, and have virtue)
- Established: July 19, 1895; 131 years ago
- Founder: King Chulalongkorn
- Sister school: Taweethapisek Bangkhunthian School; Prathomtaweethapisek School
- School district: Secondary Educational Service Area Office 1
- School code: 1010720080
- Director: Dr. Weerachet Hartwiset
- Teaching staff: 120 (2018)
- Grades: 7–12
- Gender: Male
- Age range: 12–19
- Enrollment: 2,563 (2018)
- Language: Thai; English; German; French; Chinese; Japanese
- Classrooms: 82
- Area: 5 Acres
- Colours: Green and White
- Song: Taweethapisek March
- Affiliation: (+66)4650072
- Website: http://www.taweethapisek.ac.th/

Taweethapisek School (Thai: โรงเรียนทวีธาภิเศก) is located in Bangkok Yai District, Bangkok, Thailand, in the Thonburi area. The school was founded by King Chulalongkorn (Rama V) on 19 July 1895. It has facilities such as basketball and table-tennis as well as a 400-metre running track around the football field. As of 2013 there are about 3,000 students. Most of the students are Thai and mostly Buddhist, while other students follow other religions, including Hinduism, Islam, and Christianity.

== History ==
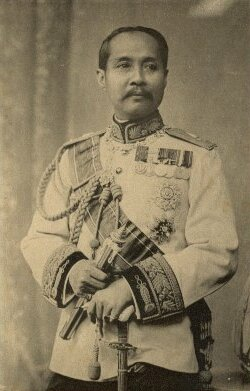
King Chulalongkorn (Rama V)

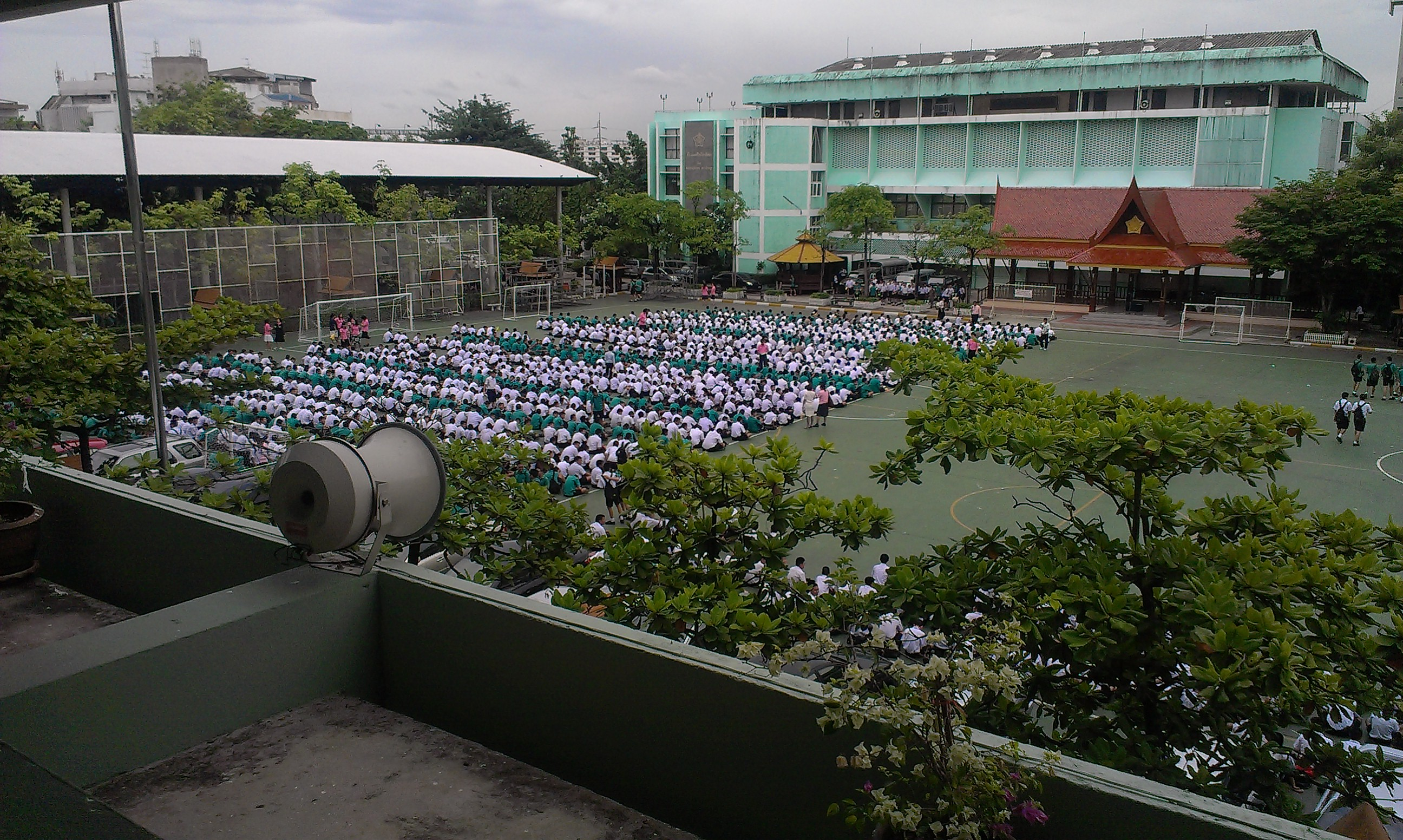
Field and Gym

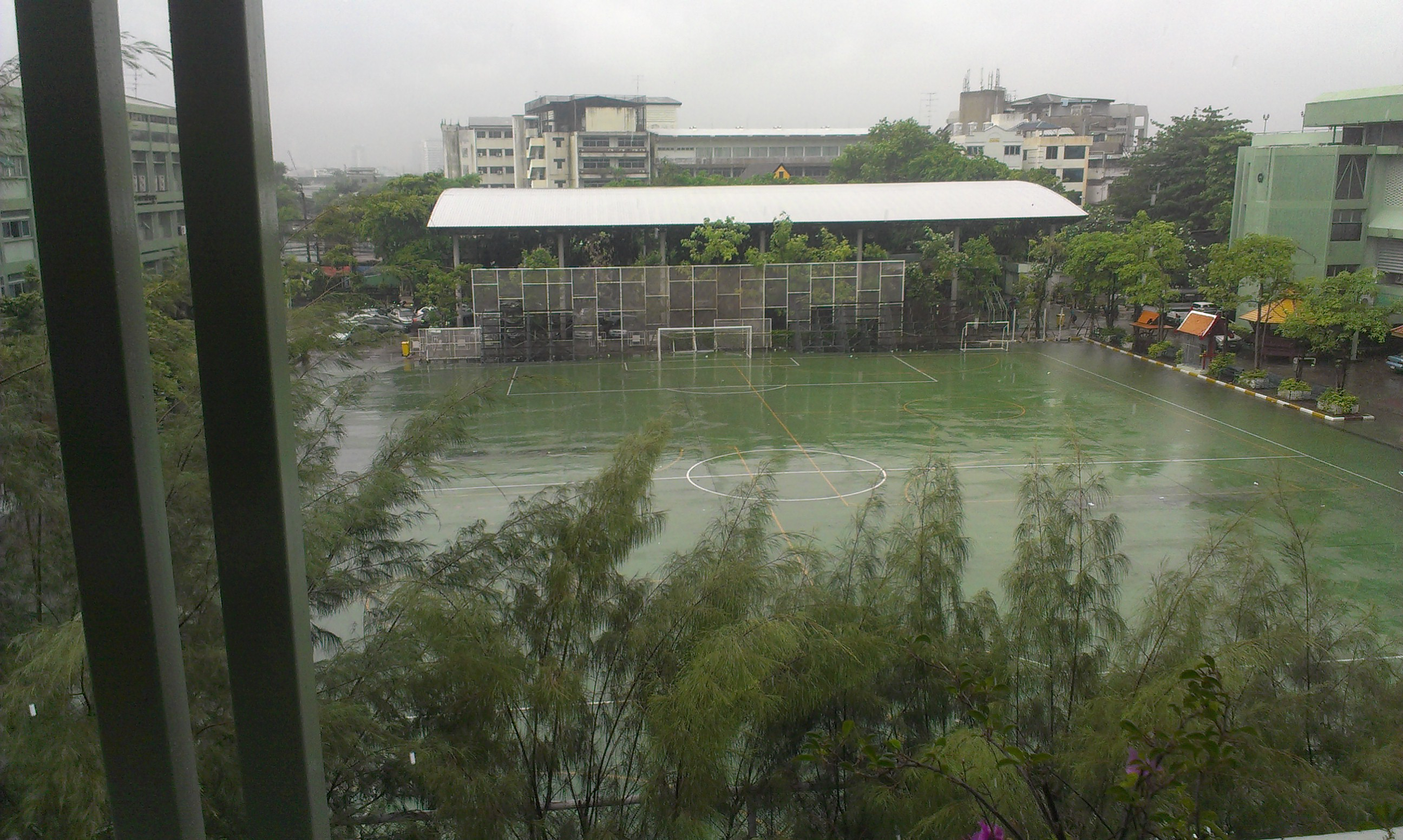
View from Bidyalabh Pruethidhada Building (Building 1)

Taweethapisek School was established on July 19, 1895 by King Rama V. To celebrate this special occasion, King Rama V wanted to establish a school in honor of his grandfather, King Rama II. He donated 2,000,000 baht and persuaded the royal members to donate to build the school at Wat Arun Ratchawararam, the royal temple of King Rama II.

King Rama V named the school "Taweethapisek". In Thai, Tawee means twice or double and pisek means coronation. When the school started, there were 162 students and 6 teachers. The first school building was 4 stories high and the first director was Khun Uparakansilapaset.

In 1951, the school started to move some students to study at a new location at Wat Nakklang because the school building at Wat Arun was too small for the increasing number of students. In 1960, the school building at Wat Nakklang was finished, and all the students in grades 7–12 were moved that year.

== Buildings ==
=== Bidyalabh Pruethidhada Building ===
- The oldest building; 14 classrooms

=== Surachai Ronnarong Building ===
- 15 classrooms, 3 computer rooms, and a library named "Arthon Sangkhawattana"

=== Prabparapak Building ===
- Art rooms and a gym

=== Thep Sittinayok Building ===
- Science operation room, Pet-Dok-Kaw room (Audiovisual Education), and Green room (Eco energy prototype classroom)

=== General Suchinda Kraprayoon Hall Building ===
- Foreign language classroom and General Suchinda Kraprayoon Hall

=== 100th Taweethapisek anniversary by General Suchinda Kraprayoon Building ===
- Taweethapisek Museum

== Sacred places ==
- The King Rama V Monument was brought to school on 19 June 1999 from the Fine Arts Department.
- Phra Buddha Taweethapisek Mahamongkol Statue
- Father Surachai Ronarong Statue, honoring a famous soldier who protected Bangkok from attack by Burma during the reign of King Rama I.

== School Symbol ==
On the coronation day of King Rama V, Taweethapisek coins were given to the royal members and bureaucrats who came to join the Taweethapisek ceremony. Thus, the school uses the coin as the school symbol. In the school symbol, there are coats of arms of King Rama II, King Rama V, and other insignias that represent them.

== Directors ==
Years in office	Name
1898–1907	Khun Upakarnsilapaset
1907–1911	Mr. Prom
1911	Phra Banjedwichachan
1911–1916	Khun Darunwitworaset
1916–1949	Khun Wisitdarunkan
1949–1965	Mr. Worasit Inthapat
1965–1974	Mr. Rewat Cheunsamran
1974–1979	Mr. Samreong Nilpradit
1979–1984	Mr. Jongkol Methakal
1984–1988	Mr. Suchat Chaimano
1988–1989	Mr. Samran Rattanawith
1989–1995	Mr. Kanok Chankhajorn
1995–1998	Mr. Prasan Utamangkhabowon
1998–2001	Mr. Suthon Julamok
2001–2004	Mr. Suwat Onjaikla
2004–2008	Mrs. Sukanya Phuphanthaphak
2008–2010	Mrs. Sumonmat Wuttisangatham
2010–2013	Mr. Somkiat Charoenchim
2014	Mr. Chaianant Kaendee
2015–2016	Mr. Chaiyasit Donthuam
2017–2019	Mr. Narong Khongsomprach
2019–2022	Mr. Prachuap Intharachote
2022–Current	Mr. Weerachet Hartwiset

== Alumni ==
Following are some notable alumni:

- Professor Sanya Dharmasakti, 12th Prime Minister of Thailand
- General Suchinda Kraprayoon, 19th Prime Minister of Thailand
- Air Chief Marshal Chalermkiat Wattanangkun, 5th Commander-in-Chief of the Royal Thai Air Force
- Admiral Kawee Singha, 26th Commander-in-Chief, Royal Thai Navy
- Yodchai Meksuwan, actor and sculptor
- Police General Seripisut Temiyavet, 5th Commissioner-General, Royal Thai Police
- General Preecha Rojanasen, National Assembly of Thailand member
- Air Chief Marshal Jirawat Moonsart, National Assembly of Thailand member
- Naowarat Pongpaiboon, S.E.A. Write Award-winning poet and national artist
- Niwat Kongpien, writer and art critic
- Thirachai Wuttitham, politician, Deputy Governor of Bangkok, Vice Chairman of Football Association of Thailand
- Phumtham Wechayachai, politician
- Theerachart Pangwirunrak, politician
- Namchai Chewawiwat, scientist and writer
- Puchong Yothapitak, actor, Thai pop singer and television host
- Touch Na Takuatung, Thai pop singer and actor
- Samapol Piyapongsiri, D.J. and actor
- Ong-Art Singlumpong, film director and television station executive director
- Atichart Chumnanon, actor and television series producer
- Teemah Kanjanapairin, D.J., news anchor, actor
- Pattaya Piamkum, futsal player
- Rangsan Viwatchaichok, Thailand national football team player
- Nacha Punthong, taekwondo practitioner
- Rangsiman Rome, politician and activist
- Natthaphong Ruengpanyawut, politician and businessman
- Sitang Buathong, transgender actress and internet personality
