= Wat Molilokkayaram =

Buddhist temple in Bangkok, Thailand

Coordinates: 13°44′28″N 100°29′22″E

- วัดโมลีโลกยาราม ราชวรวิหาร
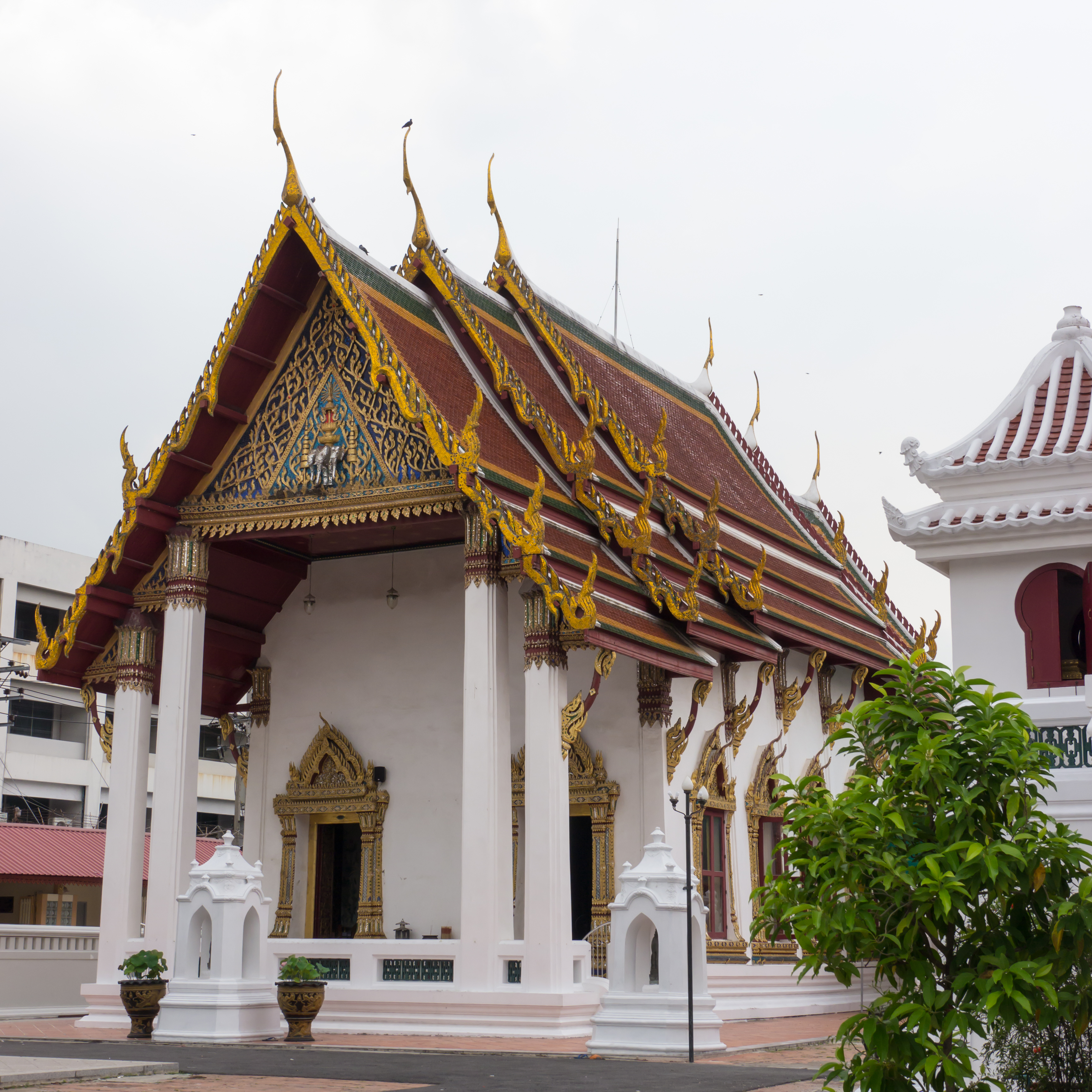
- Ordination hall

Religion
- Affiliation: Buddhist
- Sect: Theravāda

Location
- Location: Wat Arun subdistrict, Bangkok Yai district, Bangkok, 10600
- Country: Thailand
- Interactive map of Wat Molilokkayaram

Website
- watmoli.org; watmoli.com

Wat Molilokkayaram Ratchawarawihan (Thai: วัดโมลีโลกยาราม ราชวรวิหาร) is a Buddhist temple in Bangkok, Thailand. It is well known as a centre for the study of Pali.

== History ==
The temple is a second class royal monastery, it was built in mid-18th century (around end of Ayutthaya period) without knowing who founded, in that era it was named "Wat Tai Talat" (วัดท้ายตลาด; lit: "Temple at market tip") because it is located in the area next to the end of Thonburi Market. Up until now this name is still used as an informal name for the temple.

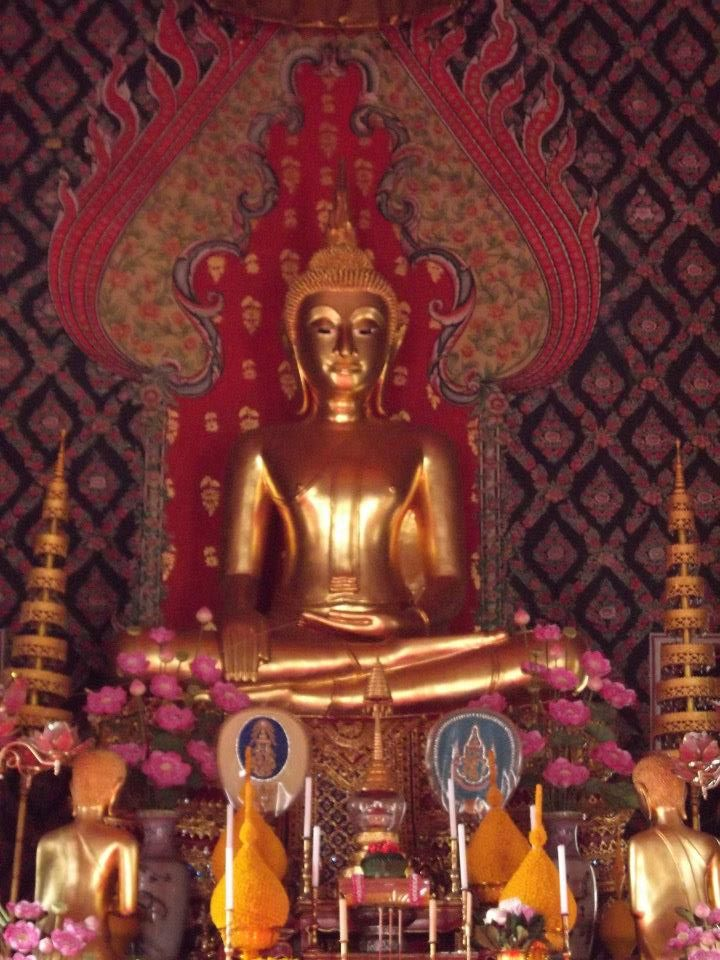
Phra Phuttha Molilokanart (พระพุทธโมลีโลกนาถ), principal Buddha image

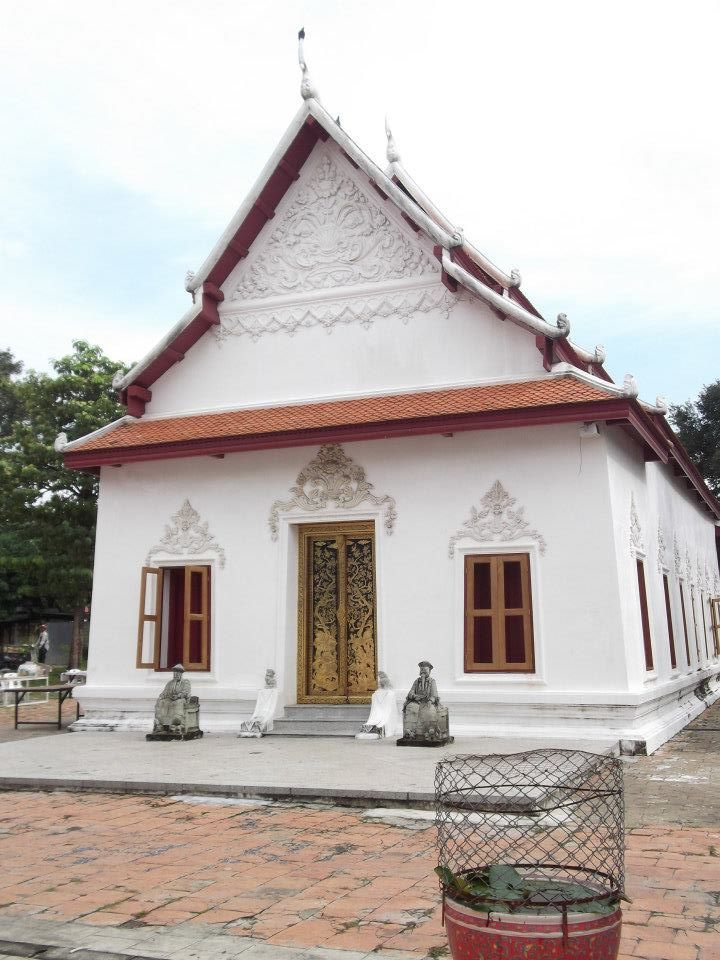
Phra Wihan Chang Kluea

In 1767, King Taksin incorporated the temple as part of his Thonburi Palace. Later, in Rattanakosin period, King Phutthaloetla Naphalai (Rama ll) renovated the ordination hall and renamed "Wat Phutthaisawan" (วัดพุทไธสวรรค์). When King Nangklao (Rama lll) restored all the temple and rename to "Wat Molilokyasutharam" (วัดโมลีโลกยสุธาราม) and changed to Wat Molilokkayaram in the present. In addition, this temple is also a place of study for the son of King Phutthaloetla Naphalai in childhood.

In 1997, the abbot of the temple further developed and upgrading to Pali school for novice and monk. At present, it is the school that has the most Pali-winning students in Thailand. In 2024, Phanuwat Kongthungmon (Thai: ภานุวัฒน์ กองทุ่งมน), a seventeen-year-old novice monk from Wat Molilokkayaram, became the youngest person in Thai history to pass the examinations for "Pali 9"—the highest level in Pali studies for members of the Thai Sangha.

== Permanent structures ==
- Ordination Hall, inside enshrined principal Buddha image in Māravijaya attitude named Phra Phuttha Molilokanart.
- Phra Wihan Chang Kluea, ancient building assumed that it had been a salty warehouse since the reign of King Taksin (hence the name "Chang Kluea"–salty warehouse in Thai). It is now a chapel and is shrines another principal Buddha image named Phra Poramet.
- Ho Somdet, two-story building with strange shapes, inside the ground floor there are statues of a French soldier carrying the base. Presumably being a contemporary French soldiers with Wichaiprasit Fort.
- Ho Trai, a scripture wooden hall of the temple, believed that it was built from the reign of King Nangklao.

== Transportation ==
- BMTA bus: route 57, 710
- Khlong Bangkok Yai Longtail Boat
