= Sitang Buathong =

Thai actress

- Born: 25 October 1962 (age 63); Bangkok, Thailand
- Education: Ramkhamhaeng University
- Occupation(s): actress internet personality

Sitang Buathong (Thai: สิตางศุ์ บัวทอง; born 25 October 1962) is a Thai actress and internet personality.

== Biography ==
Buathong was born in Bangkok and attended the Taweethapisek School. She studied law at Ramkhamhaeng University.

She is a TikToker and an actress. She has been in multiple movies, including Luang Phi Jazz 5G and Hor Taew Taek Sabat Tor Mai Ror Laew Na.

Buathong is a transgender woman.
