= Wat Arun =

Buddhist temple in central Bangkok, Thailand

Wat Arun Ratchawararam
- Temple of Dawn
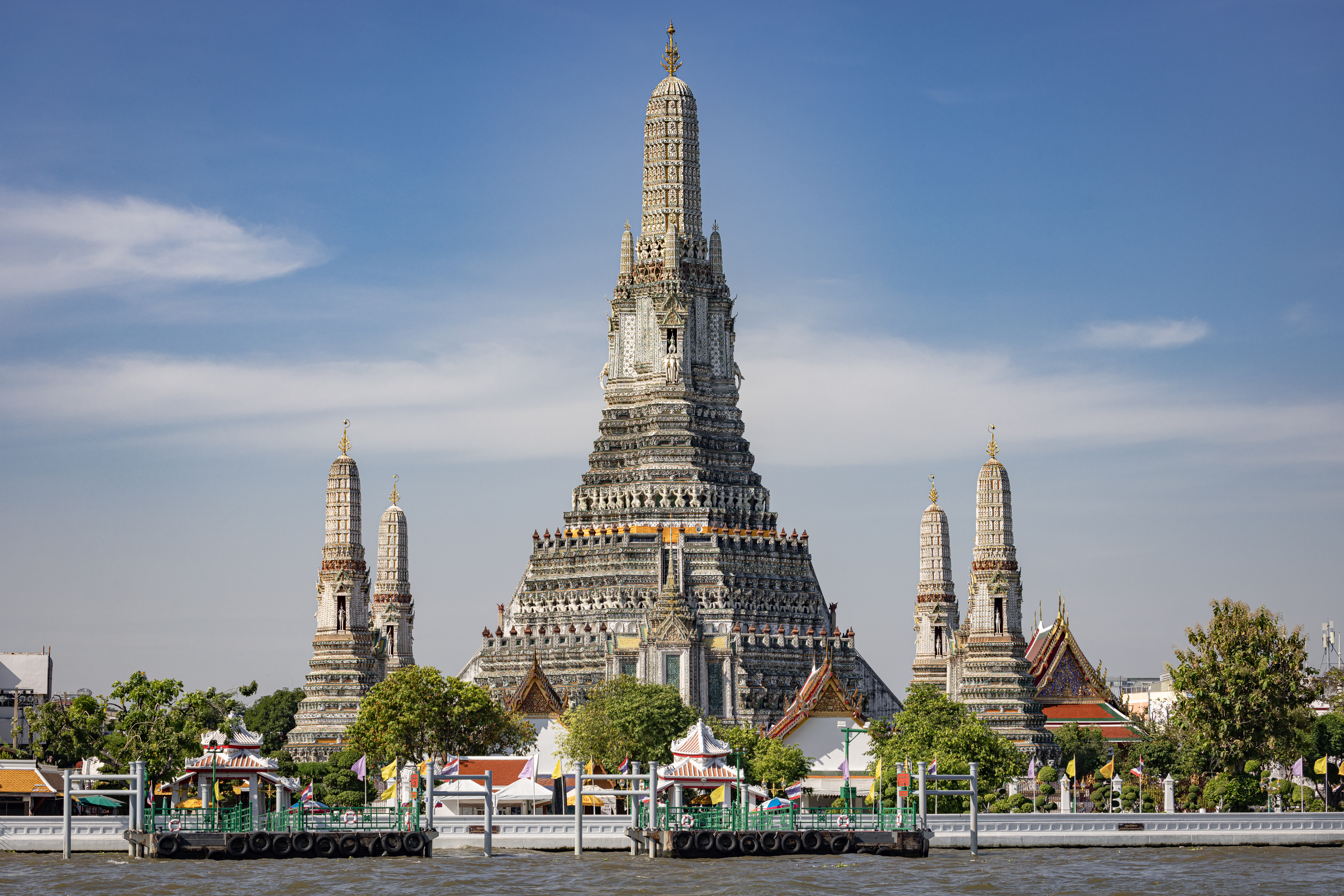
- The temple, seen from across the river

- Location within Bangkok

Religion
- Affiliation: Theravada Buddhism

Location
- Country: Thailand
- Coordinates: 13°44′37″N 100°29′20″E

Architecture
- Completed: before 1656; 370 years ago (founded); 1851 (main prang constructed); 2017 (latest major restoration)

Website
- www.watarun1.com

Wat Arun Ratchawararam Ratchawaramahawihan (Thai: วัดอรุณราชวราราม ราชวรมหาวิหาร ) or Wat Arun (Thai pronunciation: [wát ʔarun], "Temple of Dawn") is a Buddhist temple (wat) in the Bangkok Yai district of Bangkok, Thailand. It is situated in Thonburi on the west bank of the Chao Phraya River. The temple derives its name from the Hindu god Aruṇa, often personified as the rays of the rising sun. Built with a fusion of Indian influences, incorporating elements of both Hindu and Buddhist symbolism, as well as reflecting Siamese tradition and identity. Wat Arun is among the best known of Thailand's landmarks. Although the temple has existed since at least the 17th century, its distinctive prang (spire) was built in the early 19th century during the reigns of Rama II and Rama III.

== Etymology ==
The name of Wat Arun is derived from the Hindu god Aruna, who is the charioteer of the sun god Surya.

== History ==
A Buddhist temple had existed at the site of Wat Arun since the time of the Ayutthaya Kingdom, prior to the reign of King Narai. It was then known as Wat Bang Makok which was later shortened to Wat Makok, after the village of Bang Makok in which it was built (makok is the Thai name for the Spondias pinnata plant). According to the historian Prince Damrong Rajanubhab, the temple was shown in French maps during the reign of Narai (1656–88), drawn by Claude de Forbin and de Lamare.

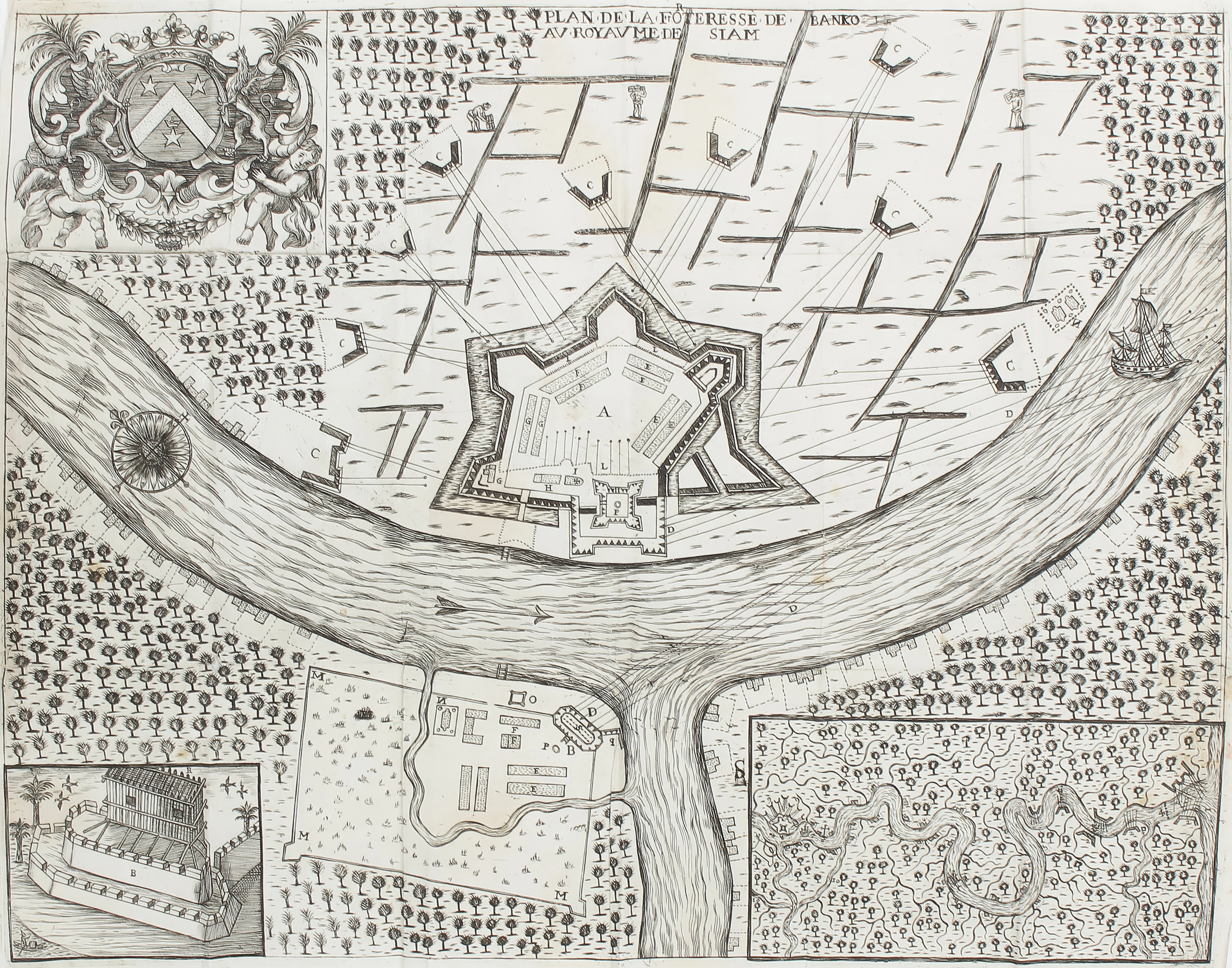
French map showing the location of Wat Makok (now Wat Arun) from Histoire de la Révolution de Siam arrivée en l'année 1688, by Jean Vollant des Verquains (1688), during the reign of King Narai.

The temple was renamed Wat Chaeng by Taksin (1767–82) when he established his new capital of Thonburi near the temple, following the fall of Ayutthaya. It is believed that Taksin vowed to restore the temple after passing it at dawn. The temple enshrined the Emerald Buddha image before it was transferred to Wat Phra Kaew on the river's eastern bank in 1785. The temple was on the grounds of the royal palace during Taksin's reign, before his successor, Rama I (1782–1809), moved the palace to the other side of the river. It was abandoned until the reign of Rama II (1809–24), who had the temple restored and had begun plans to raise the main pagoda to 70 m. The work on the pagoda commenced during the reign of Rama III (1824–51). The main prang was completed in 1851, after nine years of continued construction.

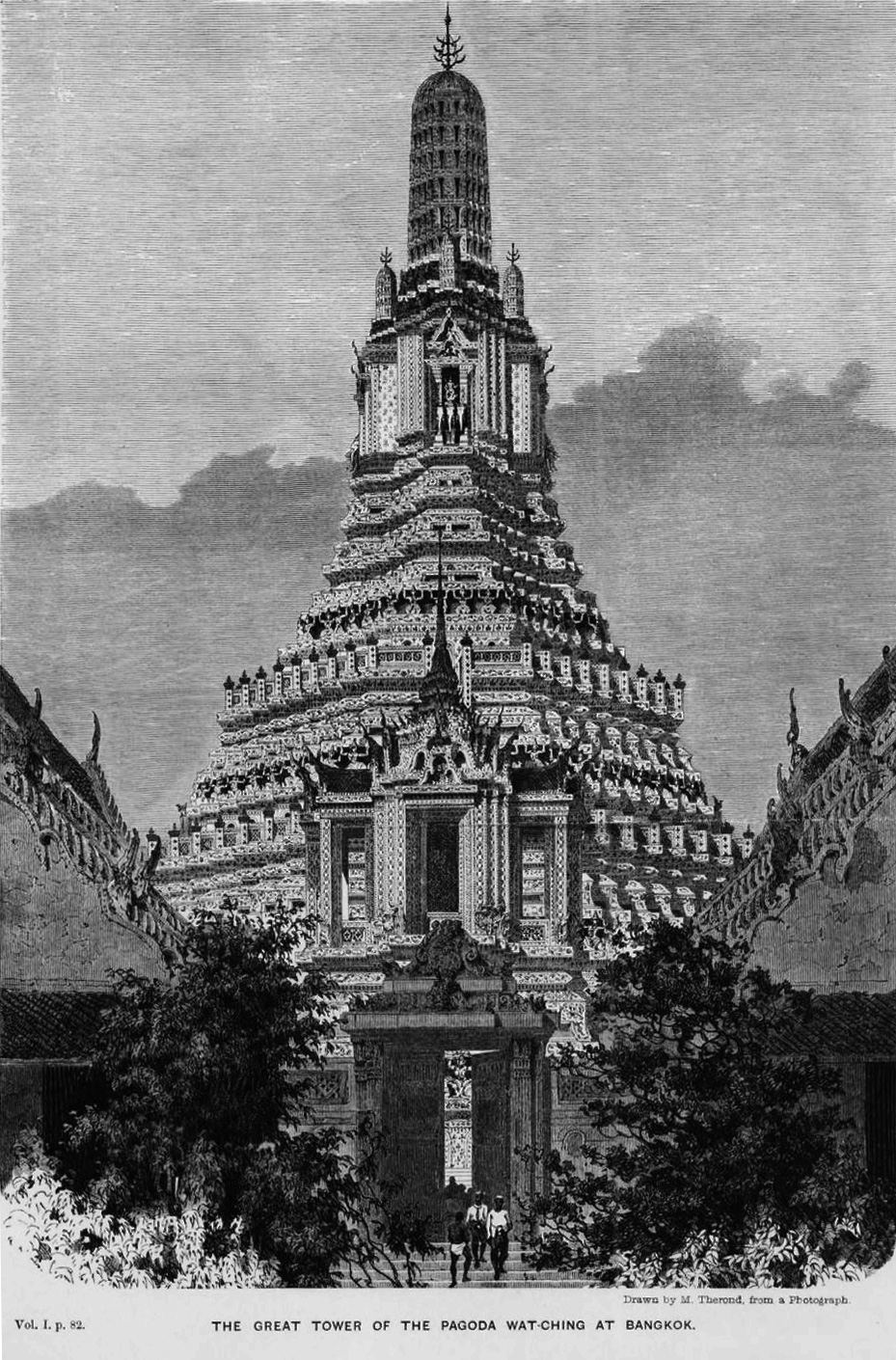
The pagoda of Wat Arun in 1858 from Mouhot.

In 1858, Henri Mouhot, a French explorer, recorded the detailed observations of Wat Chang (literally Wat Chaeng, Wat Arun) in his travel journals Voyage dans les royaumes de Siam, de Cambodge, de Laos when he had journeyed to Siam.

Nous devons ajouter que la plus belle pagode de Bangkok, celle de Wat-Chang, n’est cependant pas renfermée dans l’enceinte du palais, mais s’élève vis-à-vis, sur la rive droite du Ménam. Sa flèche, haute de deux cents pieds, est le premier indice de la capitale qu’aperçoit le voyageur qui remonte le fleuve en venant de la mer.

(Translation): Let me add here that Wat Chaeng, the most beautiful temple in Bangkok, is not located in the palace grounds but stands majestically on the right bank of the river. The spire of the pagoda, which is over 200 feet in height, is the first sign to travelers sailing upstream from the mouth of the river that they have arrived in the capital.

— Henri MOUHOT (1826–61), Voyage dans les royaumes de Siam, de Cambodge, de Laos, 1868.

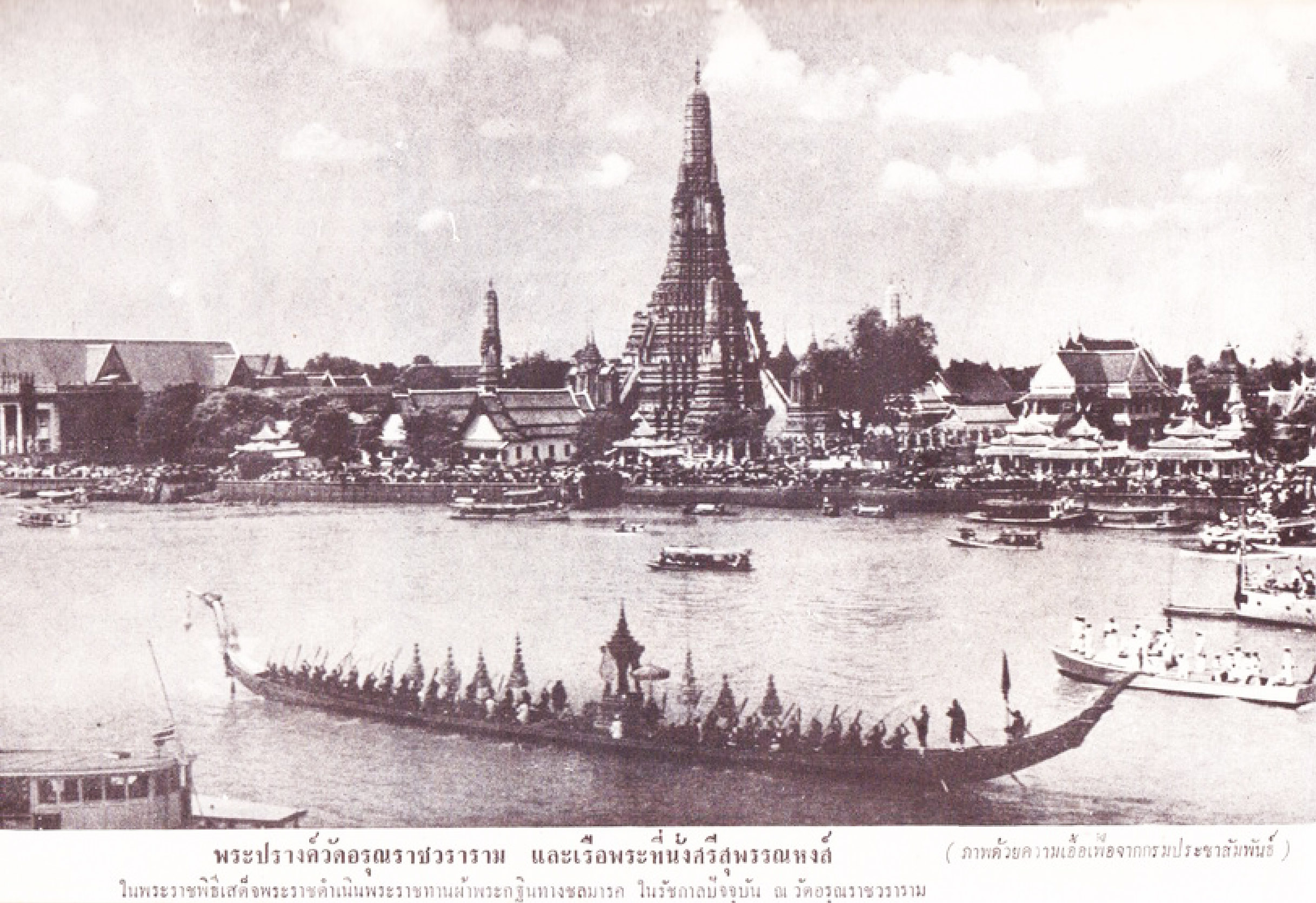
View of Wat Arun and Royal Barge Procession for Royal Kathin Ceremony (1967), reign of King Rama IX.

In 1871, Frank Vincent Jr., an American businessman, explorer, and art collector, observed the Wat Chaeng (now Wat Arun) pagoda during his travels in Siam:

The Wat Cheng pagoda is bell-shaped, with a lofty tapering steeple—a prachadi, sacred spire; the whole probably two hundred and fifty feet in height. It is built of brick and plastered on the outside, which is wrought into a grotesque and fantastic mosaic with Chinese cups, plates, and dishes of all sizes and colours, broken and whole, so set in the plaster as to form figures of elephants, monkeys, demons, and griffins, flowers, fruits, vines, and arabesques. In large niches upon the sides, at nearly half the distance to its top, are images of Buddha riding on three elephants. The grounds of Wat Cheng, some twenty acres in extent, embrace—besides the priests’ dwellings, temples, preaching-room, library, and halls—beautiful flower and fruit gardens, ponds, grottoes, belvederes, and stone statues (brought from China) of sages, giants, warriors, griffins, nondescripts, &c.

— Frank Vincent Jr. (1847–1916), The Land of the White Elephant (1874)

The temple underwent major restorations during the reign of Chulalongkorn (Rama V, 1868–1910) and in 1980, prior to the bicentenary celebration of Bangkok's foundation. The most extensive restoration work on the prang was undertaken from 2013 to 2017, during which a substantial number of broken tiles were replaced and lime plaster was used to re-finish many of the surfaces (replacing the cement used during earlier restorations). As the work neared its end in 2017, photographs of the results drew some criticism for the temple's new appearance, which seemed whitewashed compared to its previous state. The Fine Arts Department defended the work, stating that it was carefully done to reflect the temple's original appearance.

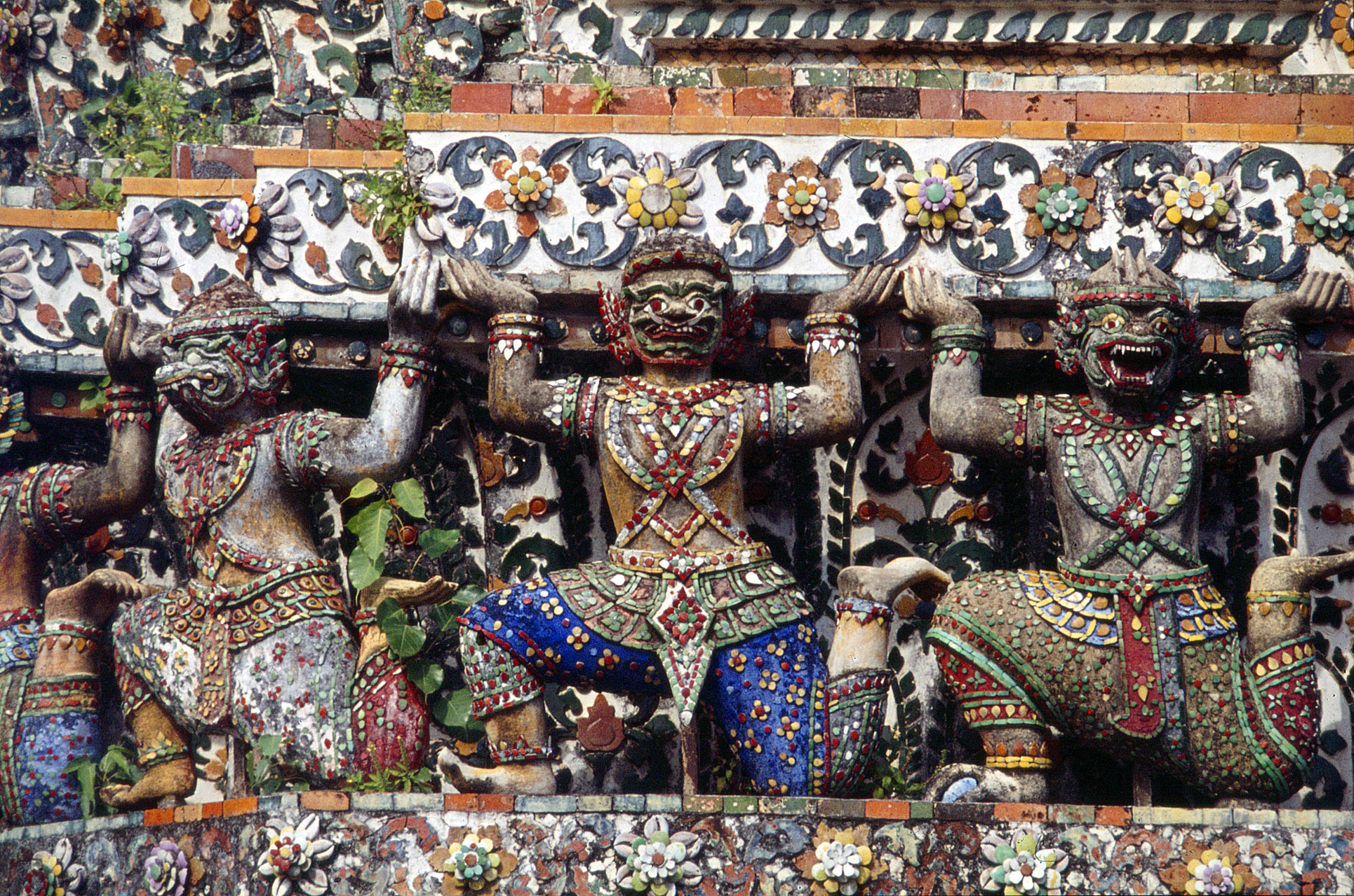
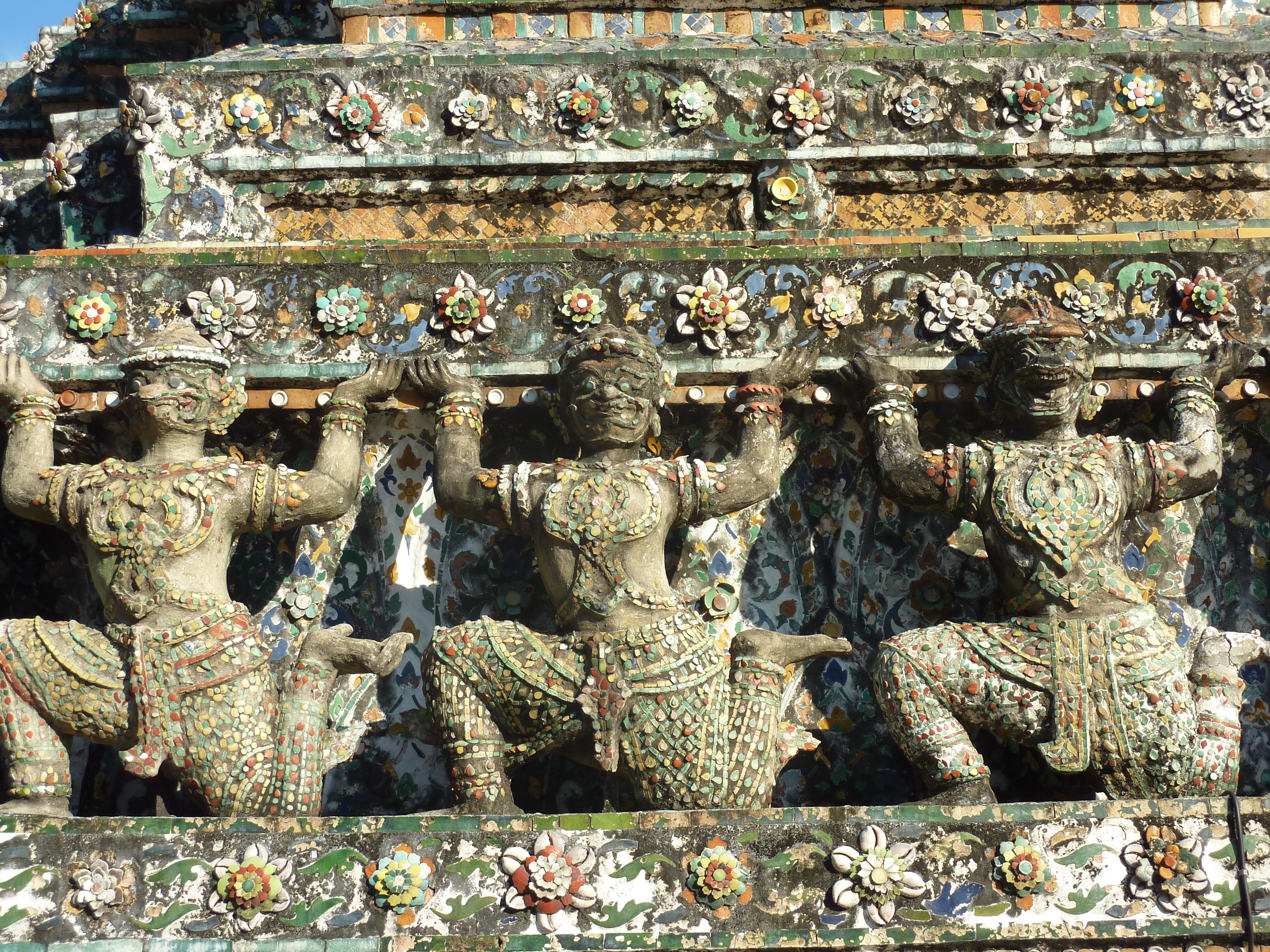
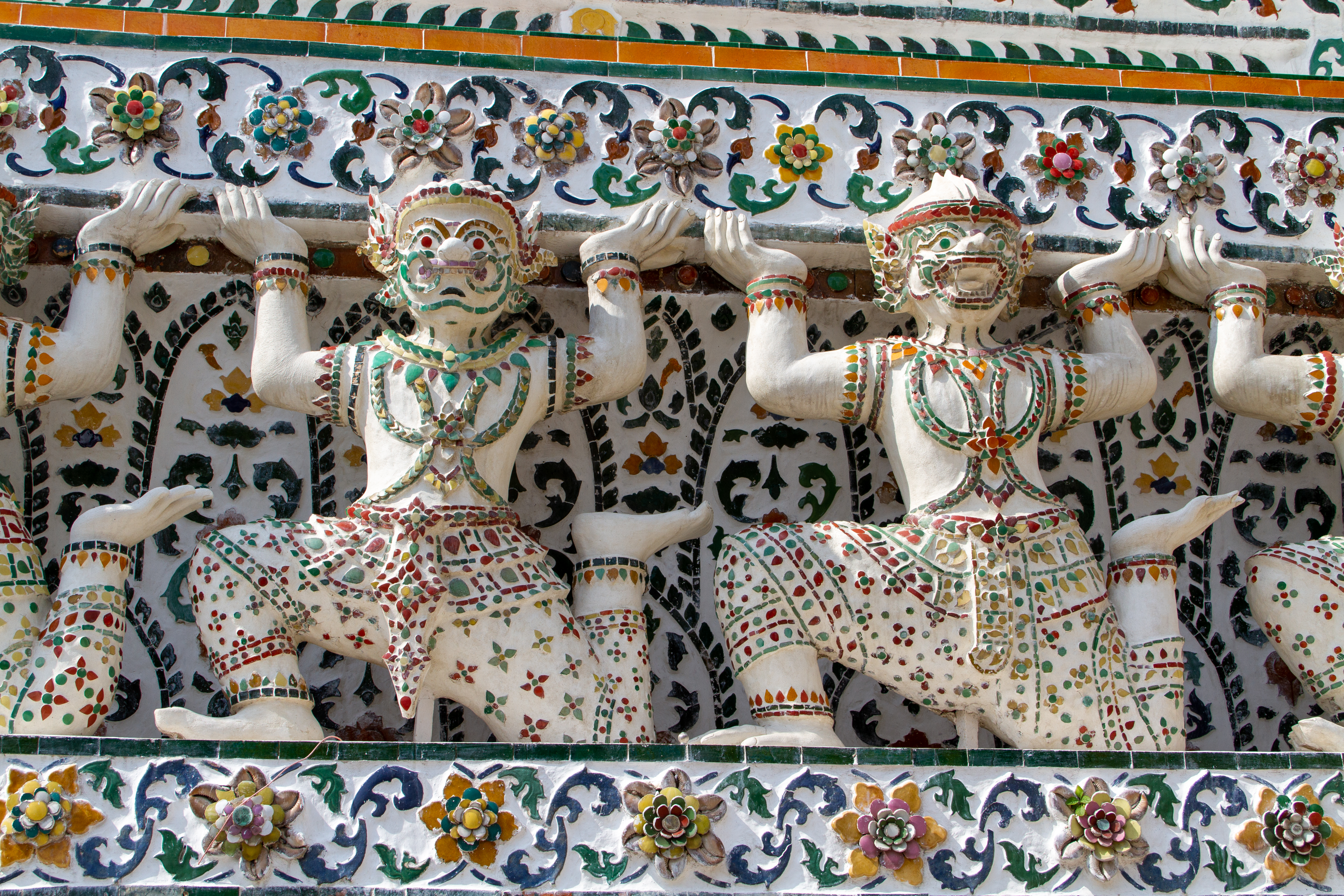
Yaksha and monkey supporting figures decorating the prang, taken in (from left to right) 1976, 2012, and 2016

== Architecture ==
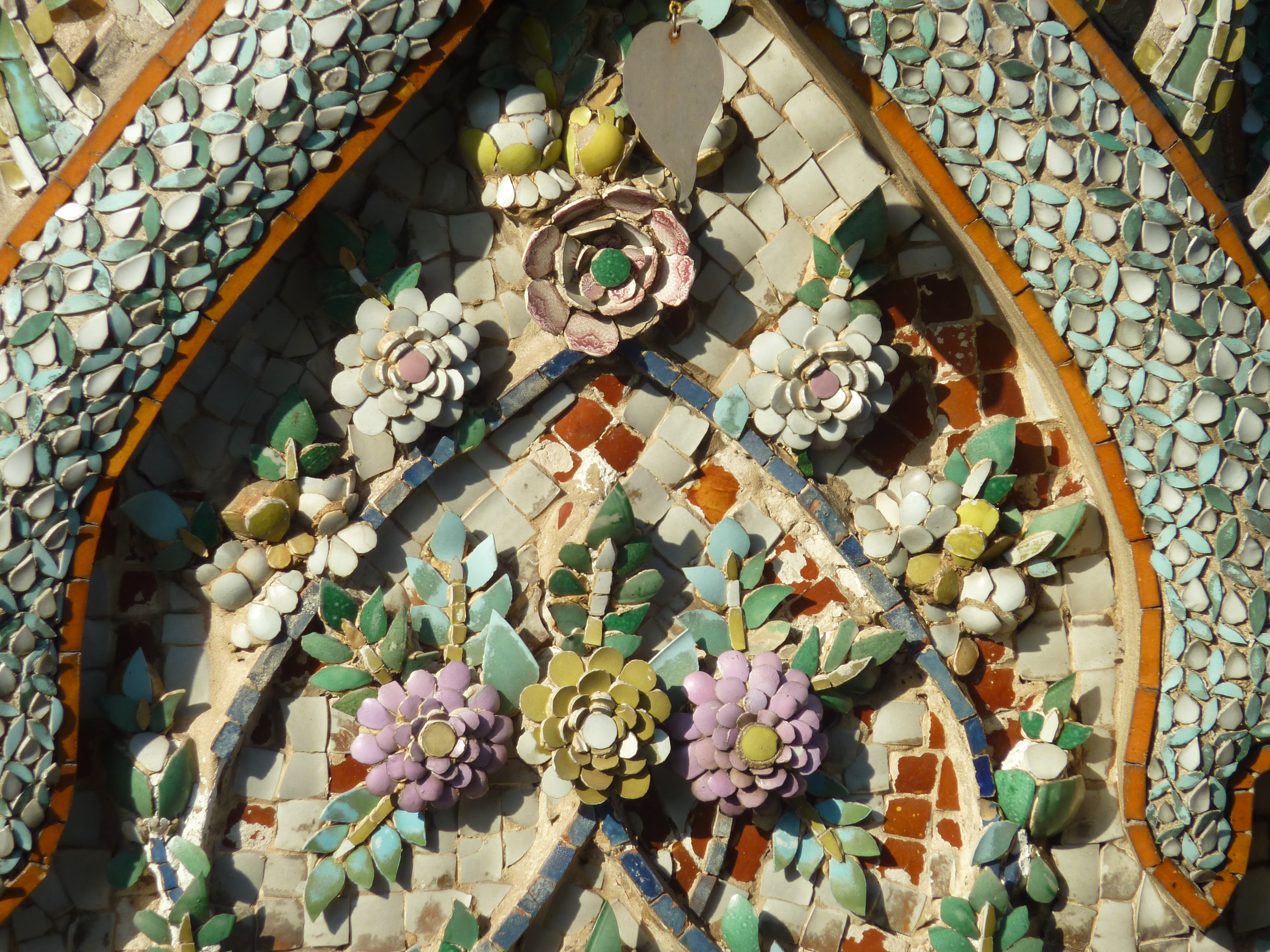
The prang and temple buildings are decorated with porcelain shards.

The main feature of Wat Arun is its central prang, a typical leap tower, which is encrusted with colourful porcelain. This is interpreted as a stupa-like pagoda encrusted with coloured faience. The height is reported by different sources as between 66.8 m (219 ft) and 86 m (282 ft). The corners are surrounded by four smaller satellite prang. The prang are decorated by shells of Mauritia mauritiana and bits of porcelain, which had previously been used as ballast by boats coming to Bangkok from China. Prince Narisara Nuwattiwong said that both prang (spire) and vihara (main hall) appeared today; they were the original works of the Department of Ten Crafts in the Ayutthaya period.

The central prang is topped with a seven-pronged trident, referred to by many sources as the "Trident of Shiva". Around the base of the prang are various figures of ancient Chinese soldiers and animals. Over the second terrace are four statues of the Hindu god Indra riding on Erawan. In Buddhist iconography, the central prang is considered to have three symbolic levels—base for Traiphum indicating all realms of existence, middle for Tavatimsa, the Tusita Heaven where all desires are gratified, and the top denoting Devaphum indicating six heavens within seven realms of happiness. At the riverside are six pavilions (sala) in the Chinese style. The pavilions are made of green granite and contain landing bridges.

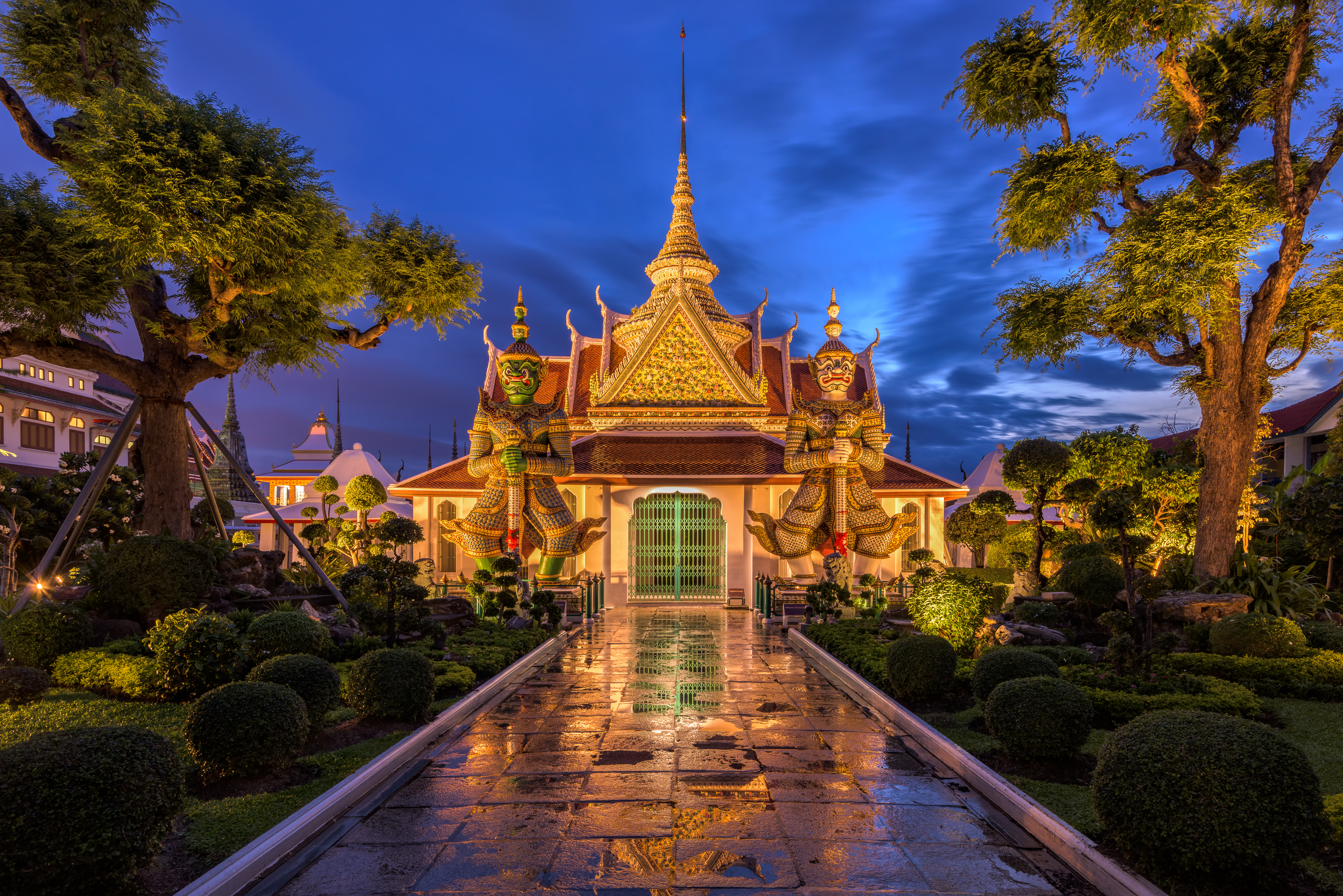
Entrance to the ordination hall, with yaksha guardian statues

Next to the prang is the Ordination Hall with a Niramitr Buddha image supposedly designed by Rama II. The front entrance of the Ordination Hall has a roof with a central spire, decorated in coloured ceramic and stuccowork sheathed in coloured china. Inside, there is a grand altar with a red, grey, and white marble decoration. There are two demons, or temple guardian figures, in front. The murals were created during the reign of Rama V.

== Cosmology ==
The central prang symbolizes Mount Meru of the Hindu cosmology. The satellite prang is devoted to the wind god, Phra Phai. The demons (yaksha) at the entranceway to the ubosot are from the Ramakien. The white figure is named Sahassa Deja, and the green one is known as Thotsakan, the Demon Rāvana from Ramayana.

== Travel ==
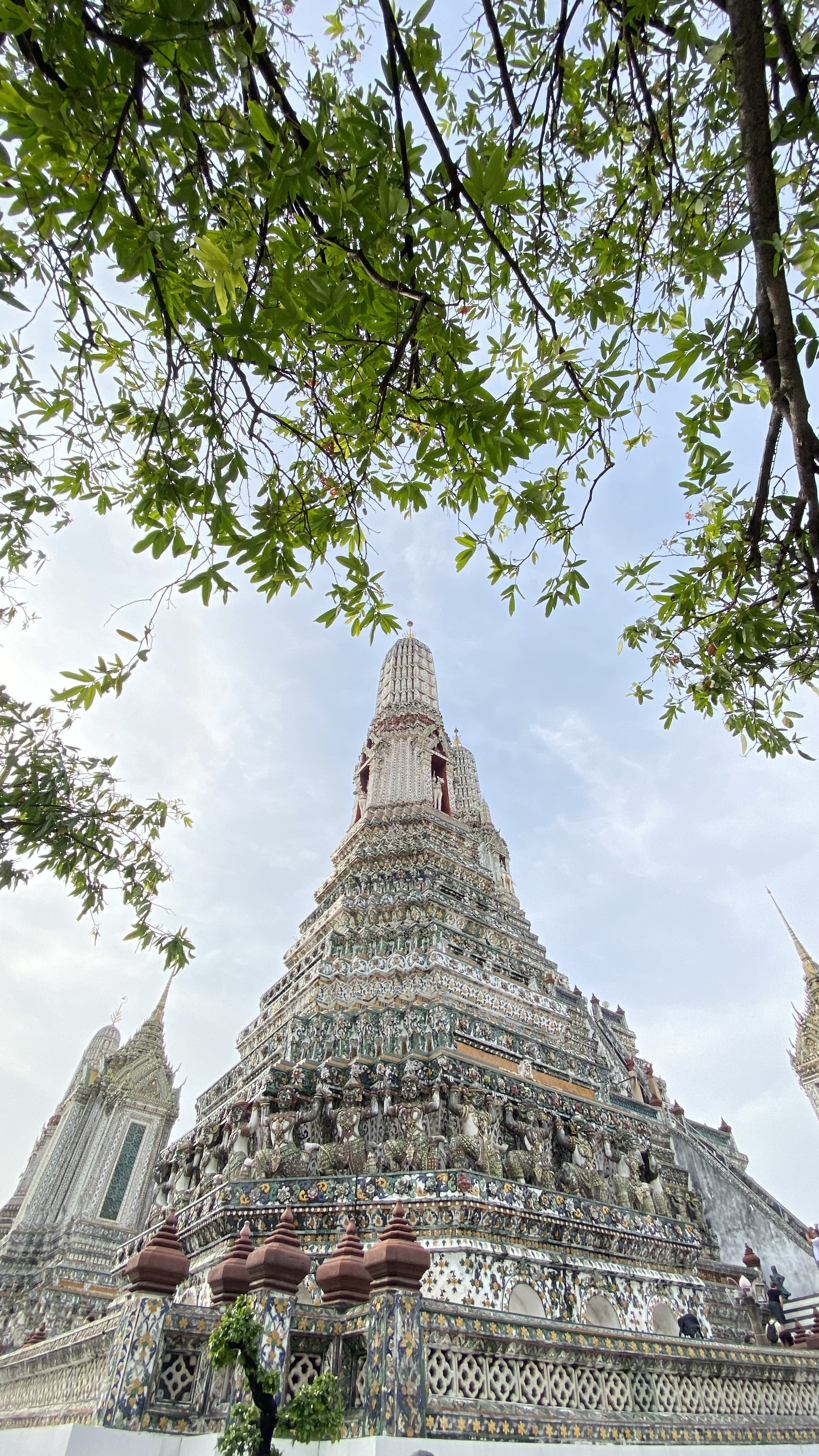
Potrait of Wat Arun

Wat Arun can be accessed through the Chao Phraya River, and ferries travel across the river towards the Maharaj pier. For foreigners, the temple charges an entrance fee of 200 baht (as of March 2024). During Kathina, the king travels to Wat Arun in a procession of royal barges to present new robes to the monks there.

In December 2023, Wat Arun was used as a venue for the Tourism Authority of Thailand’s Vijit Chao Phraya 2023 program, featuring projection-mapping and light-and-sound performances along the Chao Phraya River.

== Gallery ==
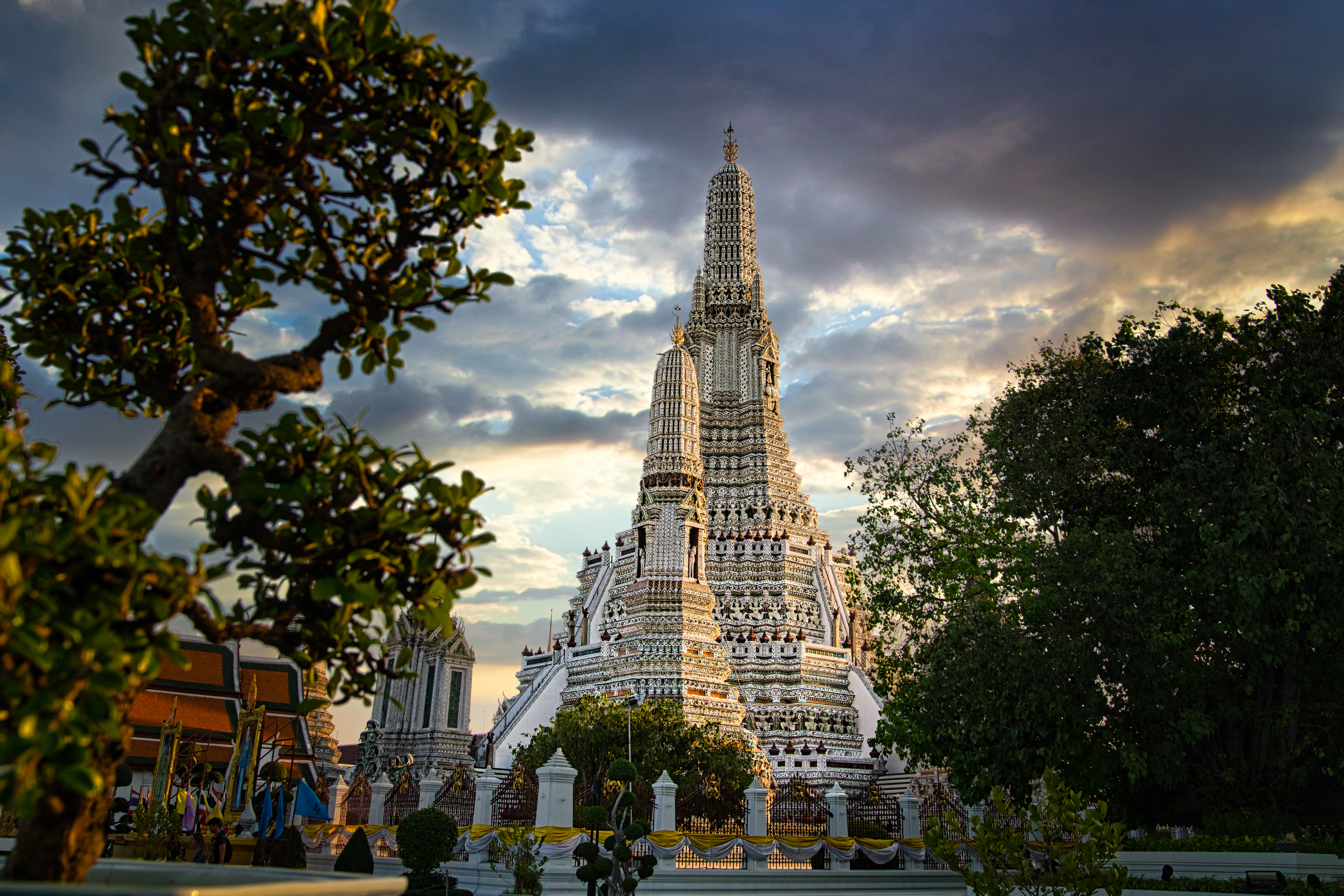
The prang, seen from within the temple grounds (2020)

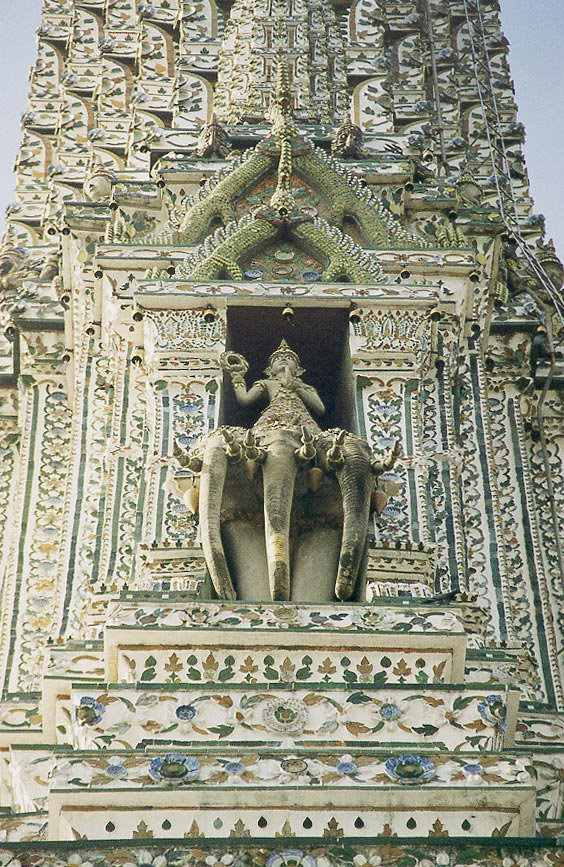
Main prang, Indra seated atop Airavata (2001)

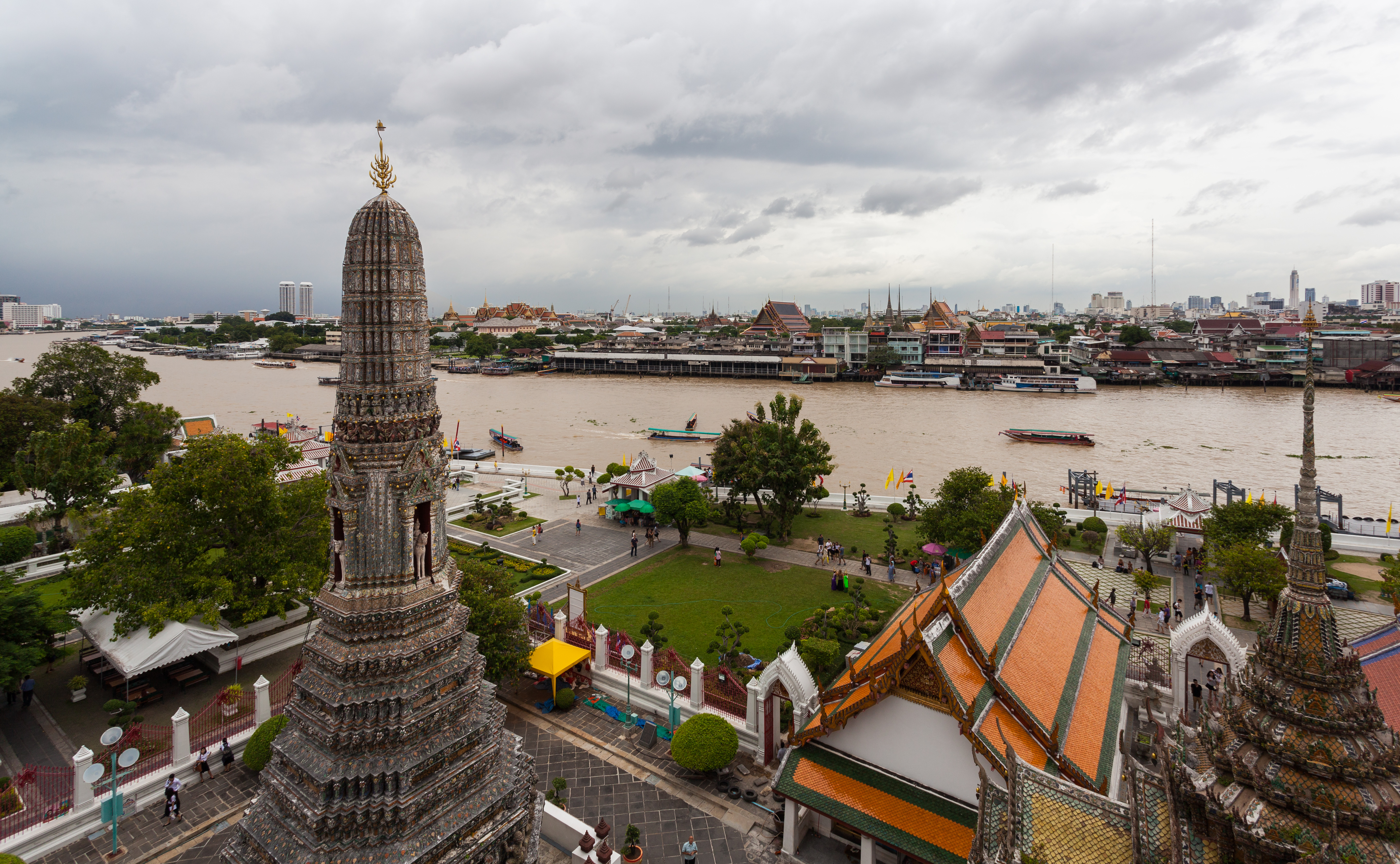
View of the river from the main prang (2013)

Wat Arun seen from the river (2018)

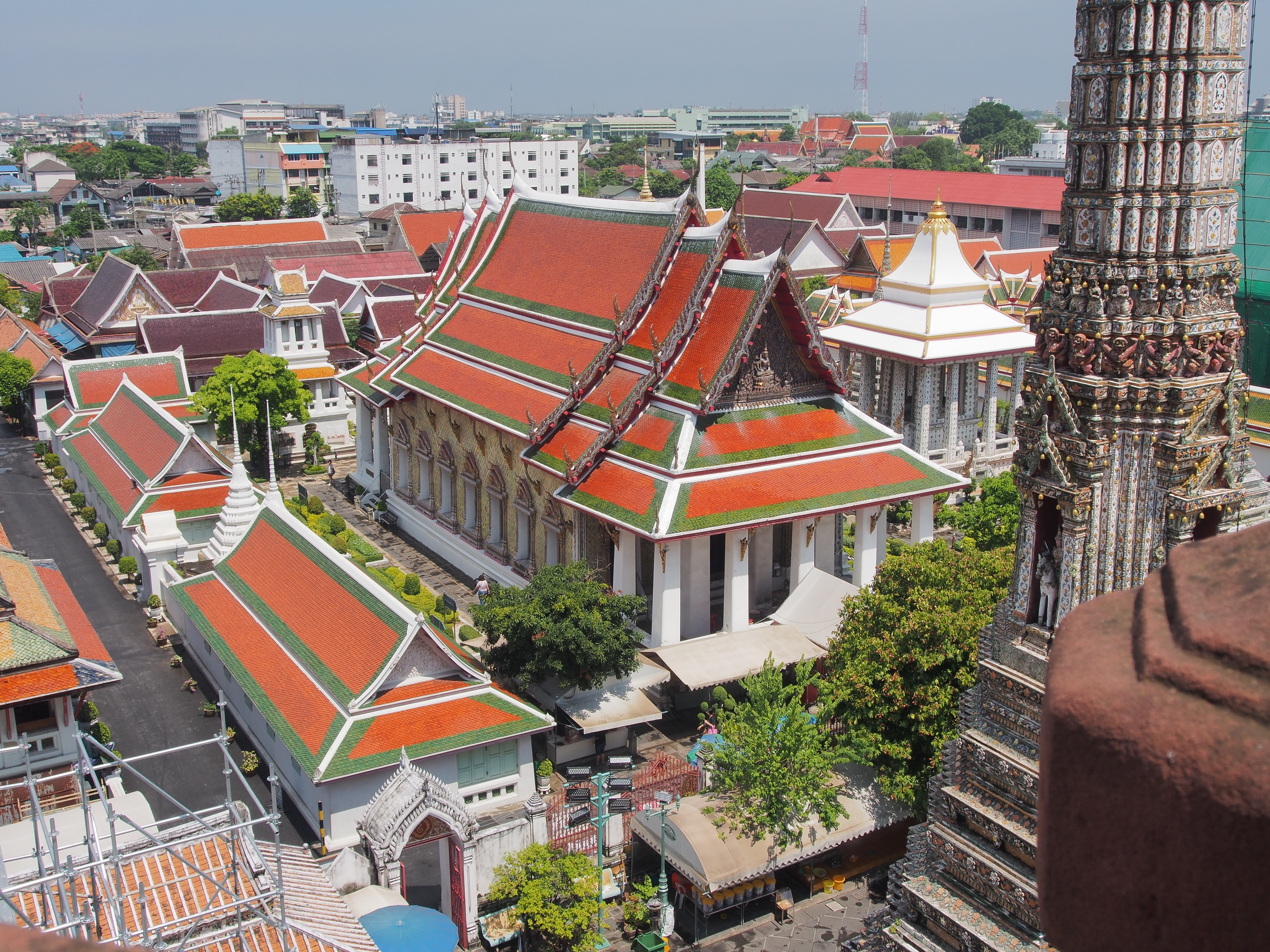
The vihara, seen from the main prang (2014)

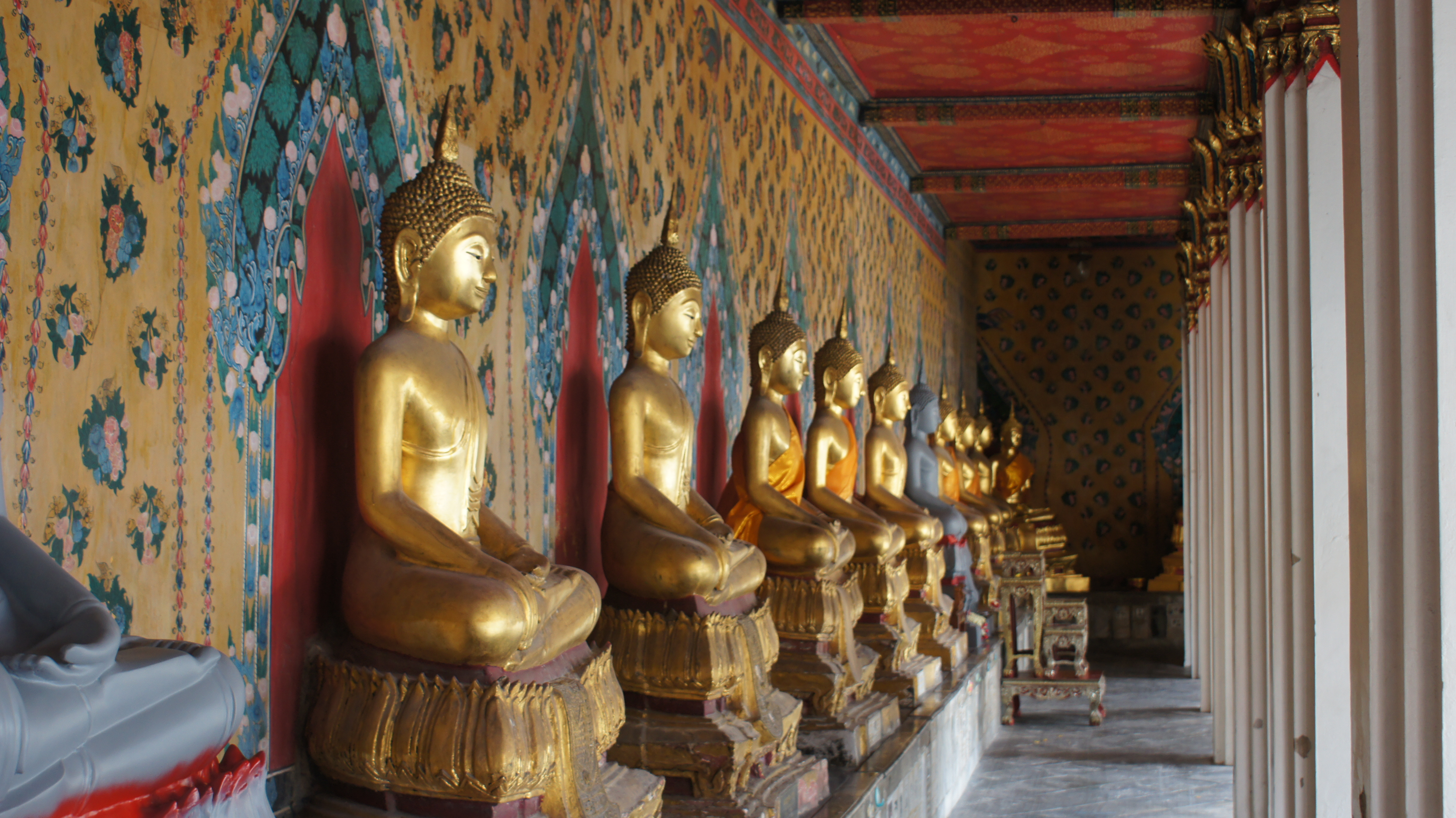
Buddha statues in the cloister (2017)

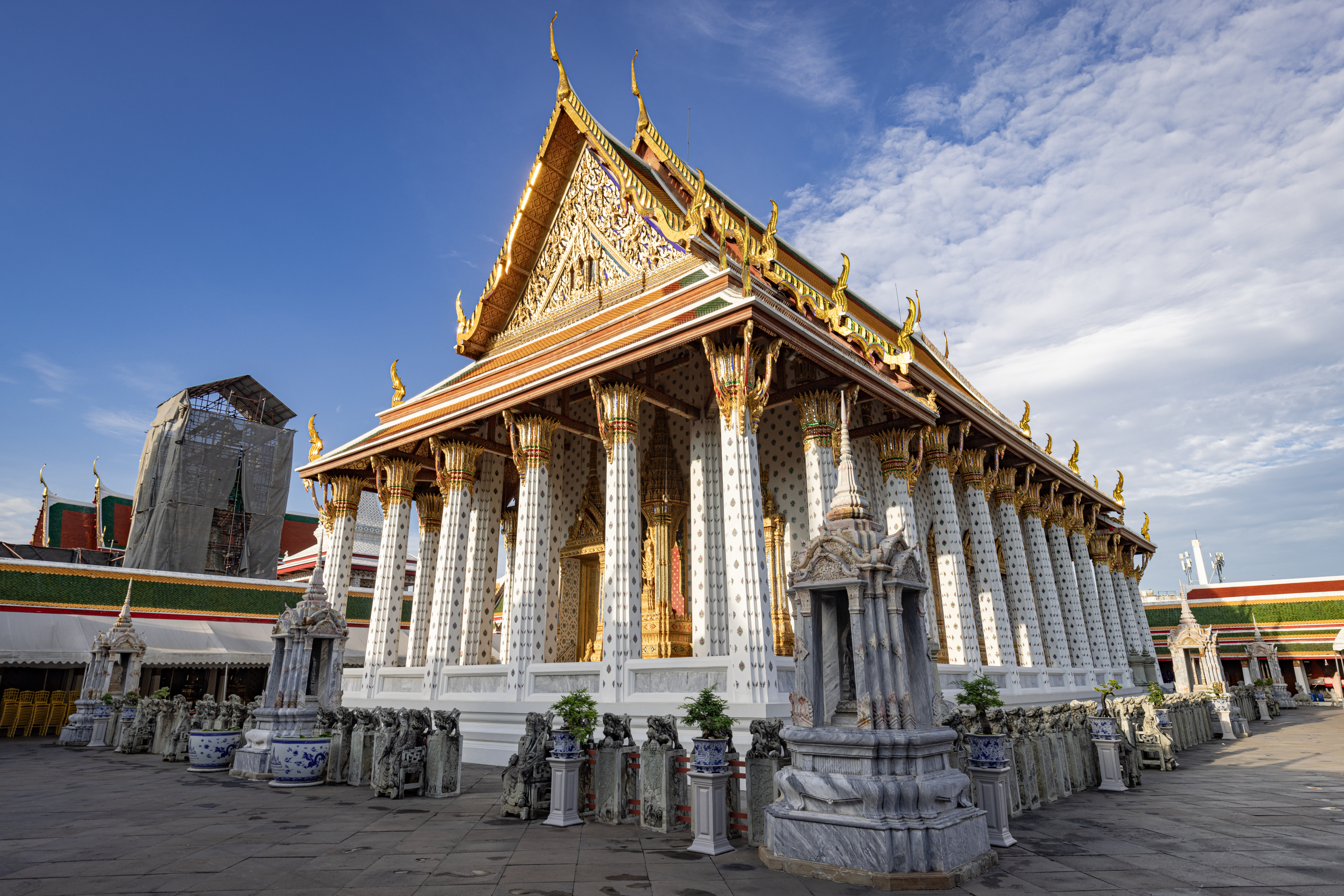
The ordination hall (2025)

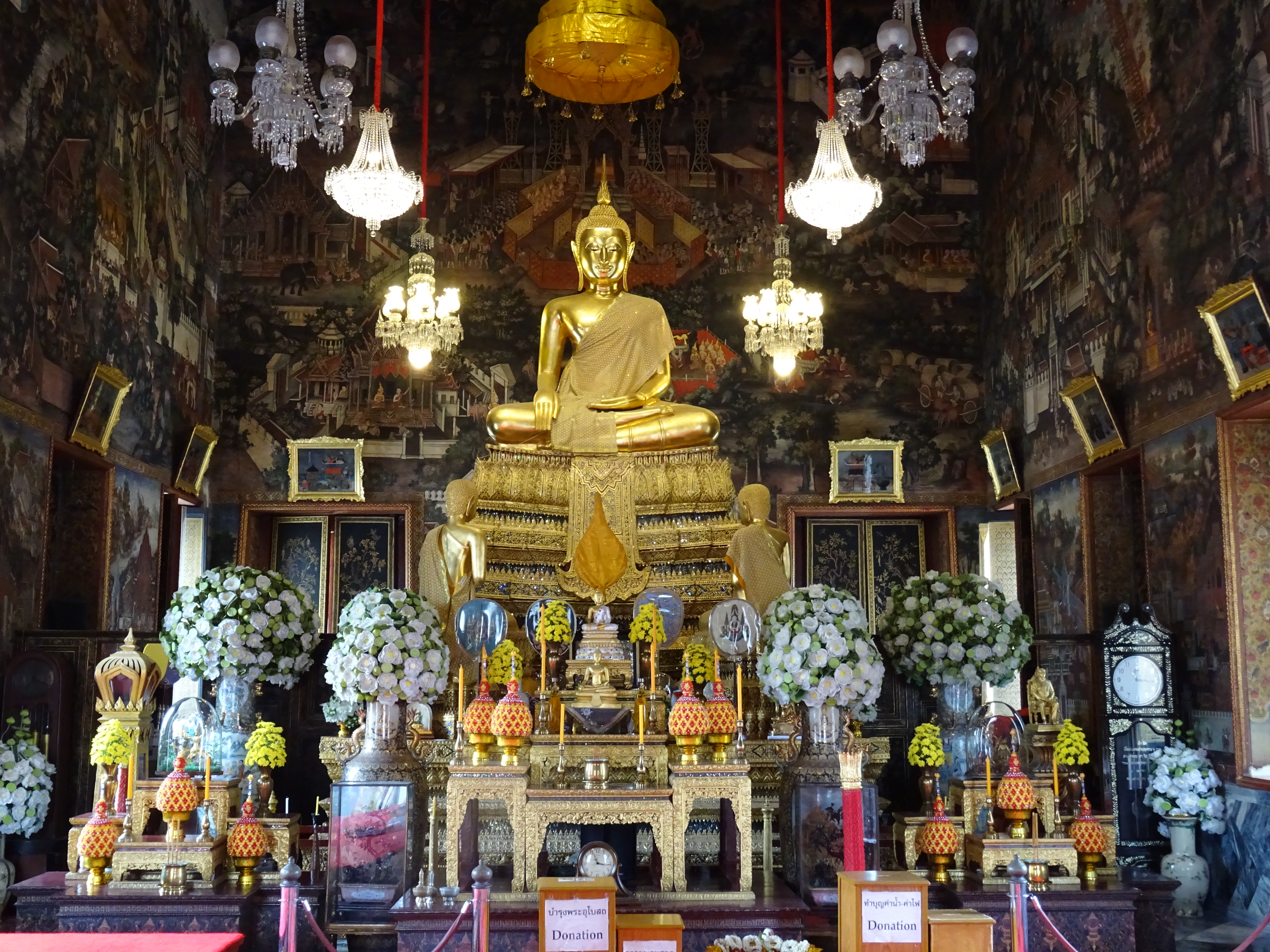
The principal Buddha image, in the ordination hall (2018)

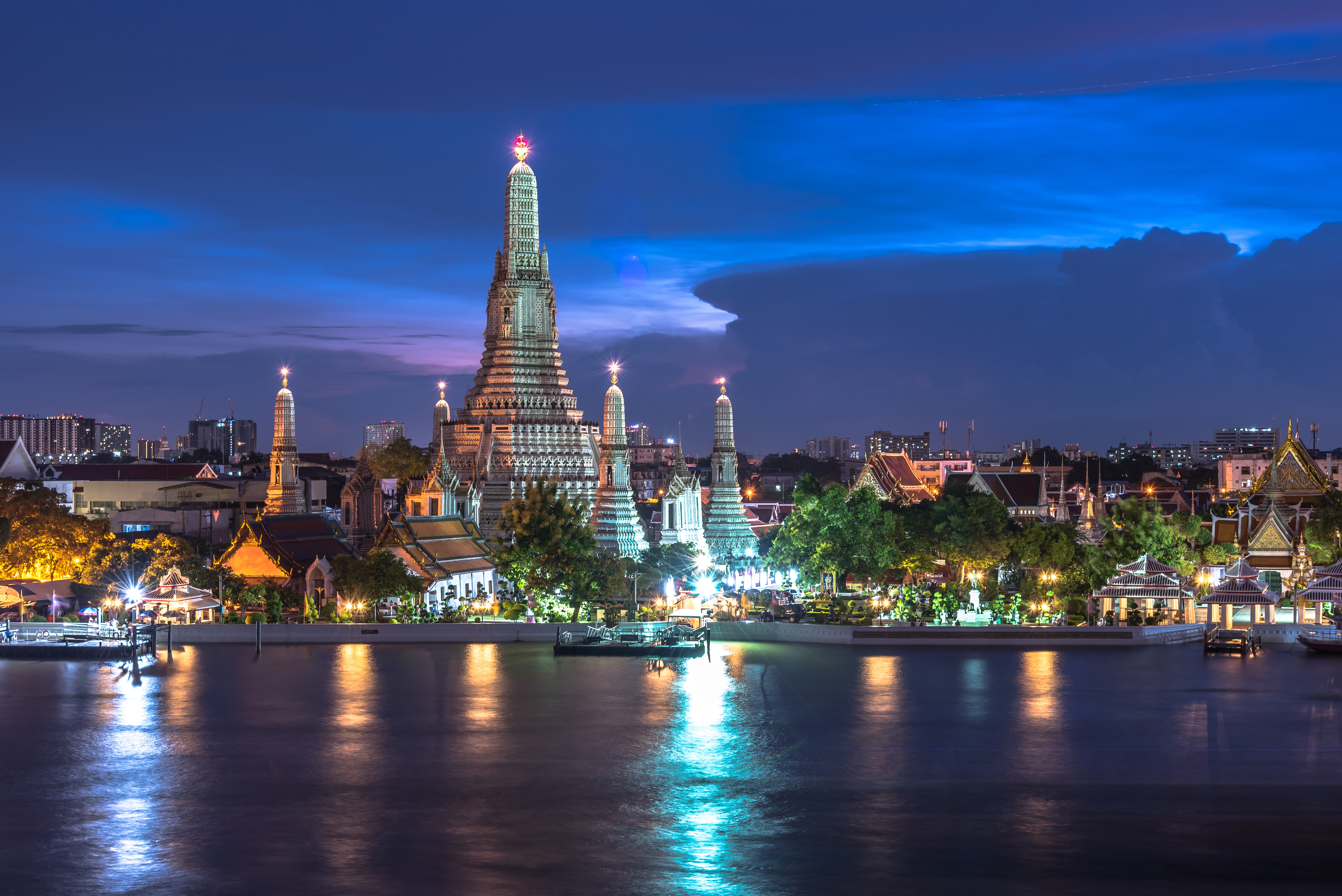
The temple lit up at night (2017)

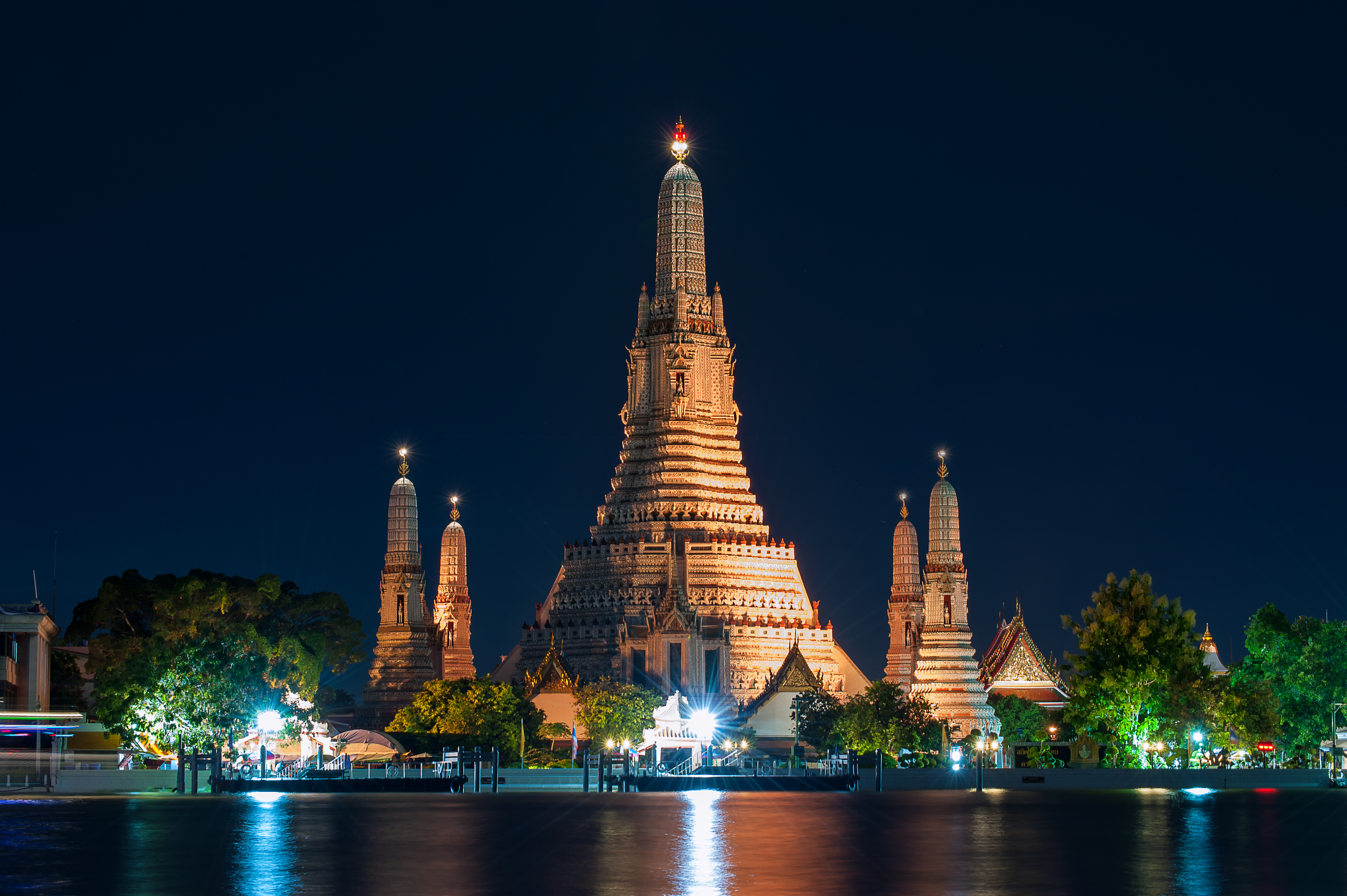
Frontal view of the prang at night (2017)

== General references ==
- Emmons, Ron (2008), Top 10 Bangkok, New York: DK, ISBN 978-0-7566-8850-9
- Liedtke, Marcel (2011), Thailand- The East (English Edition), Norderstedt: Books on Demand GmbH, ISBN 978-3-8423-7029-6
- Norwich, John Julius (2001), Great architecture of the world, USA: Da Capo Press Inc., ISBN 0-306-81042-5
- Ridout, Lucy; Gray, Paul (2009), The Rough Guide to Thailand's Beaches & Islands, India: Rough Guides, ISBN 978-1-84836-091-4
- Spooner, Andrew; Borrowman, Hana; Baldwin, William (2011), Footprint Thailand, UK: footprintbooks.com, ISBN 978-1-904777-94-6
