= Thai Sang Thai Party =

Thai Sang Thai Party พรรคไทยสร้างไทย
- Abbreviation: TST
- Leader: TBA
- Secretary-General: Chatchawan Patayathai
- Spokesperson: Pariyesh Ankurakitti
- Founder: Sudarat Keyuraphan
- Founded: 21 March 2021
- Split from: Pheu Thai Party
- Headquarters: 54/1 Soi Lat Pla Khao 60, Anusawari Subdistrict, Bang Khen, Bangkok
- Membership (2022): 27,814
- Ideology: Progressive conservatism Neoliberalism; Antimilitarism; Constitutional monarchism
- Political position: Centre-right
- Colours: Purple; Blue; Dark blue Red
- Slogan: «Let's work together to create the best Thailand. Fight for the little ones» (Thai: «มาร่วมกันลงมือสร้างประเทศไทยที่ดีที่สุด สู้เพื่อคนตัวเล็ก»)
- House of Representatives: 2 / 500
- Bangkok Metropolitan Council: 0 / 50

Website
- thaisangthai.org

The Thai Sang Thai Party (Thai: พรรคไทยสร้างไทย, romanized: Phak Thai Sang Thai; lit. 'Thais Build Thai[land] Party') is a Thai political party founded in 2021 by people formerly from the Pheu Thai Party led by Sudarat Keyuraphan.

== History ==
The Thai Sang Thai Party was registered with registration number 3/2564 on 23 March 2021, with Sa-is Boran and Wallop Chai-thaisong as the first party leader and general secretary. The first official party headquarters was in Nong Song Hong District, Khon Kaen Province, but the party's coordination center in Bang Khen District, Bangkok, was used as a temporary party office. New official headquarters were then built on Thoet Rachan Road, Sikan Subdistrict, Don Mueang District, with a pillar-raising ceremony held on 6 April 2022.

Thai Sang Thai officially began its activities with an event on 10 December 2021, which considered the policy of the party. On 22 March 2022, the party decided to nominate aviation officer Sita Tiwaree as candidate for governor of Bangkok in 2022. Along with the nomination of candidates for the Bangkok Council in all 50 constituencies on 30 March.

In July 2022, following the news that several party members had returned to Pheu Thai Party, Sudarat stated that this was not a problem and the party would continue its work in full.

Thai Sang Thai won 6 seats in the 2023 elections and joined a coalition of anti-junta parties led by the Move Forward Party, which received the most seats, in an attempt to form a government. Despite a majority in the lower house, this coalition was ultimately blocked by the junta-appointed senate, which also had a say in electing the prime minister under the junta-drafted constitution. The opportunity to form a government was passed to coalition partner Pheu Thai, which had won the second-most seats. Pheu Thai then decided to instead ally with conservative and pro-military parties in a new coalition. Rejecting an alliance with pro-military parties, Thai Sang Thai did not join the new coalition and voted against Pheu Thai's candidate Srettha Thavisin.

As part of the opposition, an internal rift increasingly developed within Thai Sang Thai, with its MPs voting in favor of the government against the party's stance. In January 2024, three of its MPs voted in favor of the government's budget bill, leading to the resignation of its secretary-general. After Srettha Thavisin was removed as prime minister in August 2024, all six Thai Sang Thai MPs voted in favor of Paetongtarn Shinawatra to replace him, prompting an ethics investigation that led to one of its MPs being expelled for repeatedly voting against the party stance and openly participating in another party's activities.

== Electoral results ==
=== General election ===
Election	Total seats won	Total votes	Share of votes	Seat Changes	Outcome of election	Election leader
2023	6 / 500	870,538	2.22%	▲6 seats	Opposition	Sudarat Keyuraphan
2026	2 / 500	322,269	0.56%	▼4 seats	Junior partner in governing coalition	Sudarat Keyuraphan

=== Bangkok Metropolitan Administration elections ===
==== Bangkok gubernatorial election ====
Election	Candidate	Total votes	Share of votes	Outcome
2022	Sita Tiwaree	73,826	2.78%	Lost ✗

==== Bangkok Metropolitan Council election ====
Election	Total seats won	Total votes	Share of votes	Outcome of election
2022	2 / 50	241,975	10.45%	▲2 seats
