= Sakoltee Phattiyakul =

Thai politician and activist (born 1977)

Sakoltee Phattiyakul MWM PCh SMT
- สกลธี ภัททิยกุล
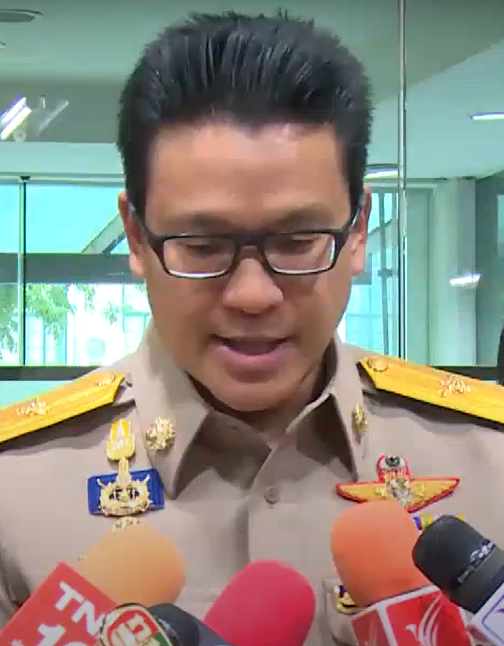
- Sakoltee in 2018

Deputy Governor of Bangkok
- In office 10 April 2018 – 7 March 2022

Personal details
- Born: 14 October 1977 (age 49) Bangkok, Thailand
- Party: Democrat (2007–2018, 2025–present)
- Other political affiliations: Palang Pracharath (2018–2021, 2023–2024)
- Spouse: Nantnatda Phattiyakul
- Children: 2 (1 son, 1 daughter)
- Parents: Winai Phattiyakul (father); Sasinee Phattiyakul (mother)

Sakoltee Phattiyakul (Thai: สกลธี ภัททิยกุล; born October 14, 1977) is a Thai politician and activist. He was one of leaders of the People's Democratic Reform Committee (PDRC) during the 2013–2014 mass protests. He used to be a deputy Bangkok governor between 2018 and 2022.

== Family and education ==
Sakoltee, who goes by the nickname "Jum" (จ้ำ), was born in military family, his father, General Winai Phattiyakul, was the secretary-general of the Council for National Security (CNS) and classmate with General Prawit Wongsuwan and General Sonthi Boonyaratglin. His mother, Sasinee (née Chaloryu), is a niece of ADm Sangad Chaloryu, head of the National Administrative Reform Council (NARC), a military junta that ruled Thailand from late 1970s to early 1980s.

Graduated secondary level from Saint Gabriel's College and Triam Udom Suksa School. He received a bachelor's degree from the Faculty of Law, Thammasat University and master's degree in law from Indiana University with George Washington University, USA.

== Political careers ==
He entered politics for the first time as a candidate for constituency 4, Bangkok (Bang Sue, Chatuchak, Phaya Thai, Lak Si) under the Democrat Party in the general election at the end of 2007, along with Boonyod Sookthinthai and Atavit Suwannapakdee, without his father being involved in any way. All three were elected.

In the 2011 general elections, he ran as a constituency 11 candidate for the Lak Si and Don Mueang (only Sanam Bin sub-district) districts of Bangkok, but lost to Surachart Thienthong of the Pheu Thai Party, the third son of Sanoh Thienthong, a veteran and influential politician.

Sakoltee joined the 2013–2014 anti-government protests and became one of the frontline leaders of the People's Democratic Reform Committee (PDRC), alongside Buddhipongse Punnakanta, Nataphol Teepsuwan and Chumpol Julsai, owing they are fellow former Democrat MPs and young men of the same age. Therefore, they received the nickname "The Four Musketeers".

In 2018, after a coup by the National Council for Peace and Order (NCPO), he became a member of the Phalang Pracharat Party. Soon after, he was appointed as the deputy governor of Bangkok by order of Pol Gen Aswin Kwanmuang, the Bangkok governor.

=== Bangkok gubernatorial election ===
By March 2022, former Palang Pracharath member, Sakoltee, resigned as a deputy governor of Bangkok to become an independent candidate for the Bangkok gubernatorial election on May 22, 2022. He launched his virtual campaign "Bangkok can be better". Just a few days before the election, he was supported by 17 candidates for the member of the Bangkok Metropolitan Administration Council (BMC), most of these people are members of the Phalang Pracharat Party.

Although not elected, but he received up to 230,455 votes (8.62%) for the fourth place. It was also analyzed that he received more votes than expected.

=== 2023 general election ===
By January 2023, he returned to the Palang Pracharath Party again, and served as the leader of the candidate team of MPs for Bangkok in the general election in the same year.

=== 2026 general election ===
In the 2026 general election, he rejoined the Democrat Party, accepting the position of deputy party leader and leading the election campaign team in Bangkok.

== Royal decorations ==
- 2010 - Knight Grand Cross (First Class) Order of the White Elephant.
- 2009 - Knight Grand Cross (First Class) Order of the Crown of Thailand.
- 2010 - Silver Medalist (Seventh Class) Order of the Direkgunabhorn.

== See also ==
- People's Democratic Reform Committee (PDRC)
- 2013–2014 Thai political crisis
- 2022 Bangkok gubernatorial election
