= Kanoknuch Klinsung =

Thai politician

- กนกนุช กลิ่นสังข์

Chair of the Bangkok Metropolitan Council
- Designate
- Assuming office July 2025
- Succeeding: Surachit Phongsinghvithya

Member of the Bangkok Metropolitan Council for Don Mueang District
- Incumbent
- Assumed office 22 May 2022

Personal details
- Party: Pheu Thai

Kanoknuch Klinsung (Thai: กนกนุช กลิ่นสังข์) is a Thai politician, serving as a member of the Bangkok Metropolitan Council representing Don Mueang district. She is expected to replace Surachit Phongsinghvithya as Chair of the Bangkok Metropolitan Council following his resignation, as Pheu Thai holds the majority of Council seats.

== Career ==
=== Bangkok Metropolitan Council ===
Kanoknuch currently serves on the council's Cleanliness and Environmental Protection Committee as second vice chairwoman.

The council is expected to elect its chairman during its third regular session of 2025, held between 29 and 31 July 2025. Kanoknuch would be the council's first female chair.
