= 2022 Bangkok Metropolitan Council election =

Thailand municipal election

- 22 May 2022
- All 50 seats in the Bangkok Metropolitan Council; 26 seats needed for a majority
- Turnout: 60.48%
Party	Vote %	Seats	+/–
Pheu Thai	24.20	20	+5
Move Forward	18.97	14	New
Democrat	13.62	9	−36
Palang Pracharath	10.73	2	New
Thai Sang Thai	9.45	2	New
Rak Krung Thep Group	7.49	3	New
This lists parties that won seats. See the complete results below.
Official results by district
- Pheu Thai Party
- Move Forward Party
- Democrat Party
- Rak Krung Thep Group
- Palang Pracharath Party
- Thai Sang Thai Party

Elections for the 13th Bangkok Metropolitan Council were held on 22 May 2022, occurring simultaneously with the 2022 Bangkok gubernatorial election. 50 councilors were elected to the council, each representing one of the districts of Bangkok. Long delayed due to the 2014 coup d'état, it was the first election to the council in 11 years, since the latest election in 2010.

Results show that opposition parties in the House of Representatives, Pheu Thai and Move Forward, gained the most seats and secured a majority in the Metropolitan Council. Pheu Thai gained 20 seats, while Move Forward gained 14 seats. The Democrat Party, the party which formerly had a majority in the council, won only 9 seats, losing over 36 seats from the last election.

== Candidates ==
In total, over 382 candidates contested in the election. Districts with the most candidates were Dusit and Suan Luang, while Samphanthawong, Taling Chan, Din Daeng, Bang Sue, Phasi Charoen, Nong Khaem, Bang Phlat, and Khan Na Yao had the least candidates running.

Major political parties in Thailand, including Pheu Thai Party, Palang Pracharath Party, Move Forward Party, and Thai Sang Thai Party had 50 candidates running in every district of Bangkok. Former governor Aswin Kwanmuang’s political group, Rak Krung Thep, had candidates running in 46 districts.

== Results ==
Party	Votes	%	Seats	+/–
Pheu Thai Party	620,009	24.20	20	+5
Move Forward Party	485,830	18.97	14	New
Democrat Party	348,852	13.62	9	–36
Palang Pracharath Party	274,970	10.73	2	New
Thai Sang Thai Party	241,975	9.45	2	New
Rak Krung Thep Group	191,922	7.49	3	New
Kla Party	53,332	2.08	0	New
Ruam Thai United Party	20,477	0.80	0	New
Bhumjaithai Party	19,789	0.77	0	New
Thai Citizen Party	14,306	0.56	0	0
Thai Liberal Party	5,496	0.21	0	New
Thailand's Future Party Party	4,544	0.18	0	New
Independents	39,343	1.54	0	−1
None of the above	240,739	9.40	–	–
Total	2,561,584	100.00	50	–
Valid votes	2,561,584	95.74		
Invalid/blank votes	113,945	4.26		
Total votes	2,675,529	100.00		
Registered voters/turnout	4,357,097	61.41		
Source: website the matter Thai PBS website Data collected by volunteers from the project. Vote62
