= 2026 Bangkok Metropolitan Council election =

- 28 June 2026
- All 50 seats in the Bangkok Metropolitan Council; 26 seats needed for a majority
- Turnout: 52.61% (▼8.80pp)
Party	Vote %	Seats	+/–
People's	32.96	22	+8
Democrat	17.35	8	−1
Bangkok Possible Group	13.76	11	New
Pheu Thai Balanced Life Group	12.45	4	−16
Better Bangkok Group	2.58	2	New
Pattana Nong Khaem Group	1.23	1	New
Independent	7.42	2	+2
This lists parties that won seats. See the complete results below.
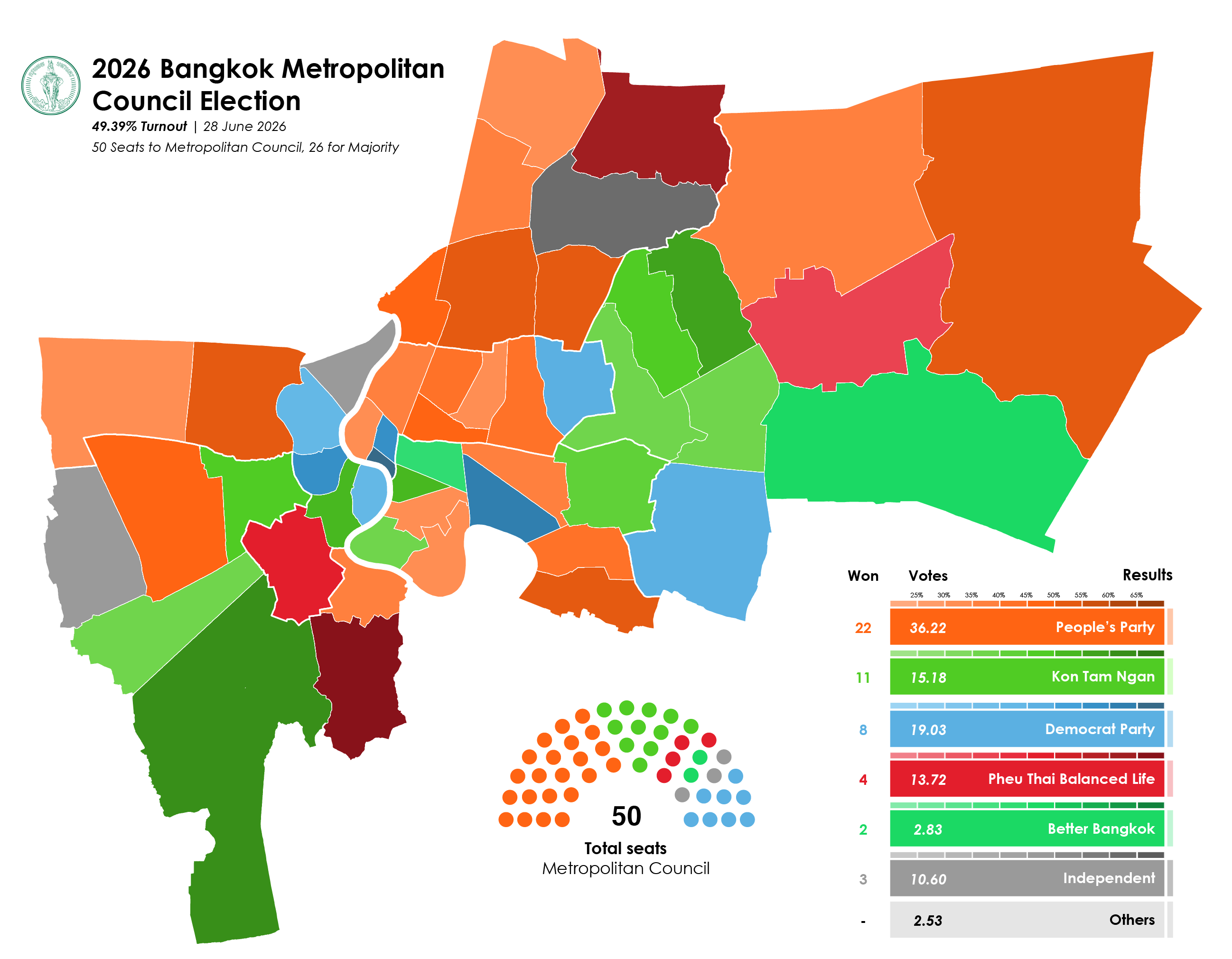
Results by district
Chair before	Chair after
Surachit Phongsinghvithya; Pheu Thai	Pattraporn Kengrungruengchai; People's

Elections for the 14th Bangkok Metropolitan Council were held on 28 June 2026, occurring simultaneously with the 2026 Bangkok gubernatorial election. 50 councilors are being be elected to the council, each representing one of the districts of Bangkok.

== Candidates ==
Major political parties in Thailand, including the People's Party, have announced their intention to run candidates in the election. While the Pheu Thai Party officially announced that it would not field any candidates under the party's banner, some of its members, led by Theerarat Samrejvanich, believed that candidates should nevertheless be nominated. They therefore contested the election independently under the name Pheu Thai Balanced Life Group.

The Bhumjaithai Party, a coalition partner in the government, did not field any candidates in either the Bangkok Metropolitan Council election or the Bangkok gubernatorial election.

== Campaigning ==
=== People's Party ===
The People's Party launched their campaign on 25 February 2025, named Hackable Bangkok 2026. The party aims to address issues including air quality, utilization of green spaces and vacant land, and environmental management. Current People's Party Councillors from the 13th Council include those representing Thawee Wattana and Phra Khanong districts.

=== Bangkok Possible ===
The Bangkok Possible working team, a group of independent 30 candidates led by former MP Duangrit Benjathikul Chairungruang, launched its campaign focused on legislative reforms rather than executive projects. Bangkok Possible aims to make public all voting records and meeting documents, expand public participation, and use data from the Traffy Fondue app to shape legislation. The group includes nearly 20 former Pheu Thai Party members and veterans of the BMC, including a former speaker and deputy speaker.

== Opinion polls ==
Fieldwork date	Polling firm	Sample size	Party candidates					Bangkok Possible Group	Better Bangkok Group	ind.	Others	Und./ no ans.	Lead			
Fieldwork date	Polling firm	Sample size	PTP (Note: As the Pheu Thai Balanced Life Group)	PPLE ↑ MFP	DP	BJT	NEWA	Bangkok Possible Group	Better Bangkok Group	ind.	Others	Und./ no ans.	Lead			
28 Jun 2026	Election results	52.61% (Note: Election turnout.)	12.45	32.96	17.35	—	—	13.76	2.58	7.42	Others	Und./ no ans.	Lead	4.57	15.75 (Note: None of the above: 8.91; Invalid/blank votes: 6.84)	15.61
16–19 Jun 2026	Suan Dusit	2,562	10.62	31.81	8.78	—	—	—	—	33.96	Others	Und./ no ans.	Lead	2.85	11.08	2.15
15–17 Jun 2026	NIDA	2,000	6.85	27.80	12.30	—	—	7.30	1.35	32.85	1.80	8.60	5.05			
9–12 Jun 2026	Suan Dusit	2,029	10.55	28.88	9.96	1.58	—	—	—	35.39	1.12	12.52	6.51			
4–7 Jun 2026	KPI	1,600	10.6	27.7	11.5	—	—	3.8	1.4	18.5	6.4 (Note: Economic Party: 4.1; Bangkok Can Fly Group: 2.3)	17.7	9.2			
2–4 Jun 2026	NIDA	2,000	6.05	26.50	11.50	—	—	6.05	0.60	29.10	1.30	18.35	2.60			
25–26 May 2026	NIDA	1,310	44.81 (Note: Party candidates: 33.21; Party affiliates: 11.60)					—	—	48.47	—	6.72	3.66			
22–25 May 2026	KPI	1,600	41.2					—	—	41.6	—	17.2	0.4			
19–22 May 2026	Suan Dusit	1,179	7.46	35.20	6.45	1.18	—	—	—	26.55	0.34	22.82	8.65			
6–8 May 2026	Suan Dusit	1,074	7.91	40.13	7.91	2.89	0.47	—	—	21.23	—	19.46	18.90			
22 May 2022	2022 election	61.41%	24.20	18.97	13.62	0.77	—	—	—	1.54	—		5.23			

== Results ==
Graph of the party split among 50 seats.
Party	Votes	%	Seats	+/–
People's Party	708,253	32.96	22	+8 (Note: As the Move Forward Party)
Democrat Party	372,861	17.35	8	–1
Bangkok Possible Group	295,601	13.76	11	New
Pheu Thai Balanced Life Group (Note: Pheu Thai Party affiliates)	267,442	12.45	4	–16 (Note: As the Pheu Thai Party)
Better Bangkok Group	55,470	2.58	2	New
Economic Party	35,752	1.66	0	New
Pattana Nong Khaem Group	26,340	1.23	1	New
Friends of Kanoknut Group	19,756	0.92	0	New
Minburi Peung Dai Group	8,585	0.40	0	New
Thailand's Future Party	6,027	0.28	0	0
Lat Krabang Pattana Group	1,167	0.05	0	New
Bangkok Can Fly Group	718	0.03	0	New
Independents	159,432	7.42	2	+2
None of the above	191,555	8.91	–	–
Total	2,148,959	100.00	50	–
Valid votes	2,148,959	93.16		
Invalid/blank votes	157,830	6.84		
Total votes	2,306,789	100.00		
Registered voters/turnout	4,384,695	52.61		
Source: Election Commission
