= 2022 Bangkok gubernatorial election =

- 22 May 2022
- Registered: 4,402,941
- Turnout: 60.73% (▼3.25 pp)
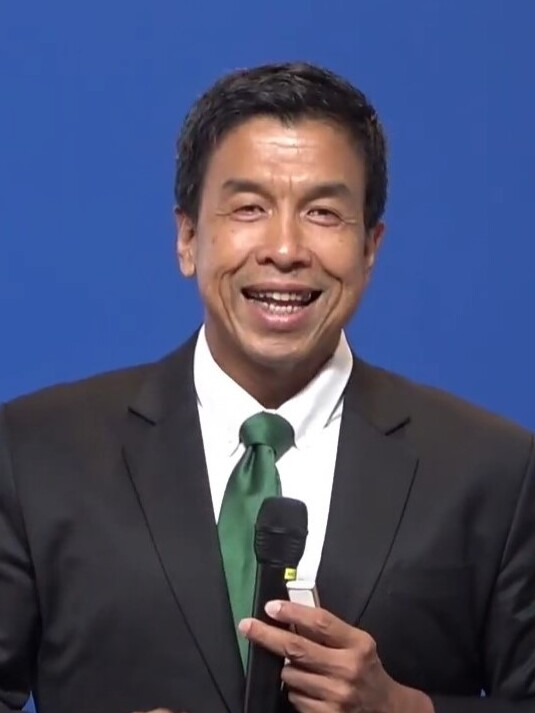

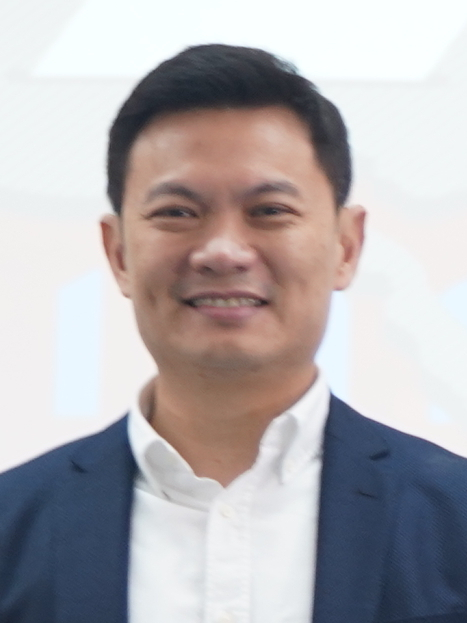

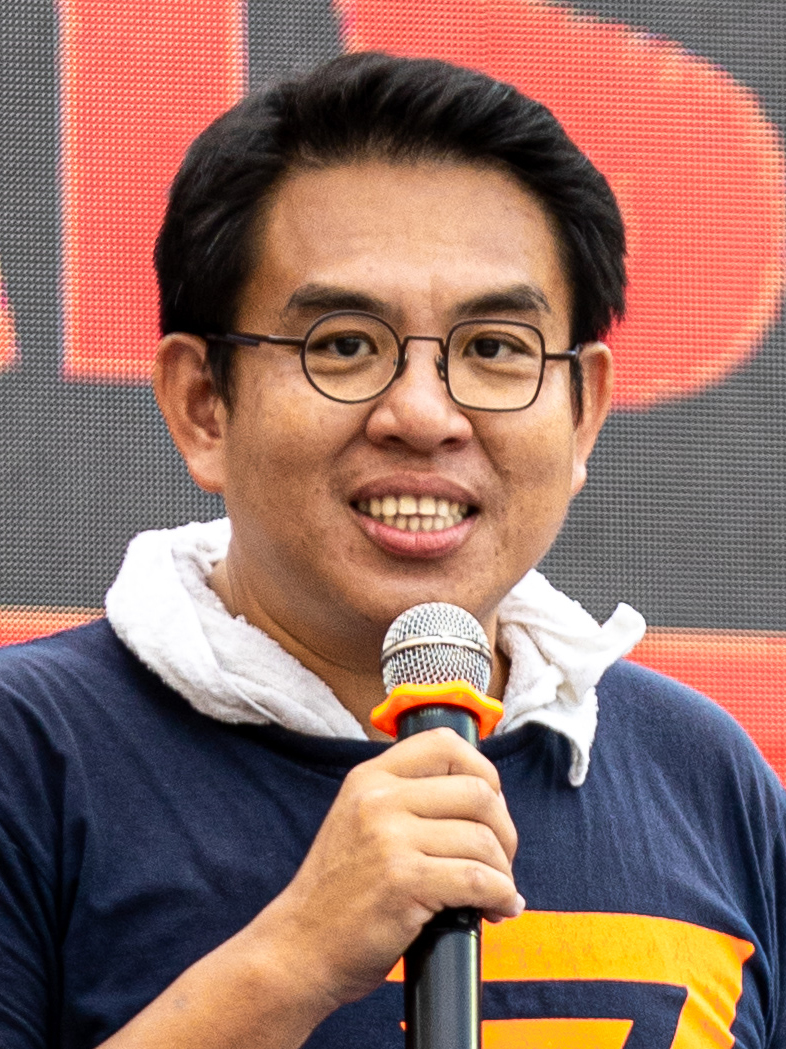

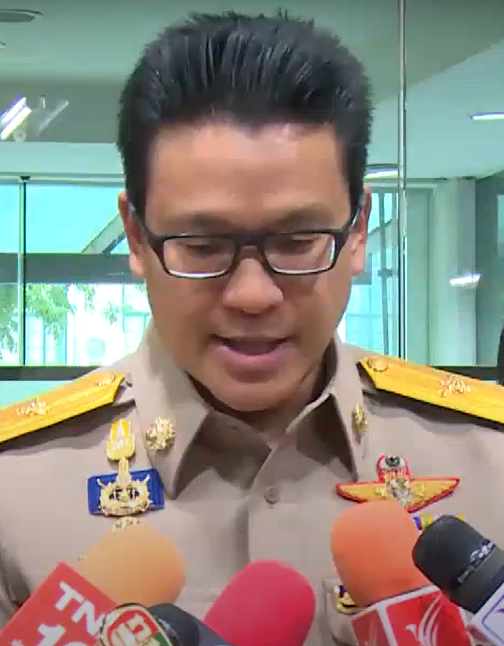

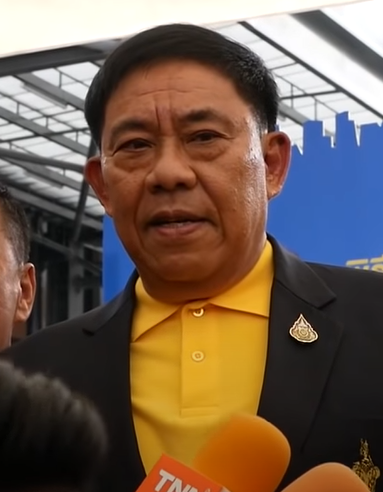
Candidate	Chadchart Sittipunt	Suchatvee Suwansawat	Wiroj Lakkhanaadisorn
Party	Independent	Democrat	Move Forward
Popular vote	1,386,215	253,938	254,723
Percentage	52.63%	9.64%	9.67%
Candidate	Sakoltee Phattiyakul	Aswin Kwanmuang
Party	Independent	Rak Krung Thep
Popular vote	230,534	214,825
Percentage	8.75%	8.15%
- Gubernatorial election results map. Shades of green denote the percentage points of votes Chadchart gained in each district.
Governor before election
Aswin Kwanmuang
Independent (Note: Aswin was appointed by the NCPO.)
Elected Governor
Chadchart Sittipunt
Independent

The 2022 Bangkok gubernatorial election was held on 22 May 2022, this was the eleventh election for the governorship of Bangkok. The election took place 9 years after the latest election in 2013, long delayed due to military rule from 2014 to 2019 following the 2014 coup d'état. Chadchart Sittipunt, an independent candidate who was a member of the Pheu Thai Party, won the election in a landslide and became the 17th governor. He gained over 1.38 million votes, breaking the record set by Sukhumbhand Paribatra in 2013.

Chadchart won an outright majority in every district with over 1 million overall votes more than the first runner-up candidate, Suchatvee Suwansawat, who contested for the Democrat Party. Aswin Kwanmuang, the 16th governor who was appointed by the military junta in 2016, also contested in the election but came in fifth with 8.15% of the vote.

== Background ==
After the 2014 coup d'état, the National Council for Peace and Order (NCPO) became the military government in control of Thailand. It ordered all local elections to be halted, while the governor of Bangkok, Sukhumbhand Paribatra, remained in his position. In 2016, Sukhumbhand was removed by the NCPO and replaced by Aswin Kwanmuang, the Deputy Governor of Bangkok at the time.

With the adoption of the 2017 constitution, the military government was disbanded following general elections held in 2019, though the charter made no provisions regarding the schedule of a return to elected local government. On 14 March 2022, the Election Commission of Thailand (ECT) announced that the Bangkok gubernatorial election will be held on 22 May 2022, occurring simultaneously with the Bangkok Metropolitan Council election and the local elections in Pattaya.

== Candidates ==
Over 31 candidates contested in this gubernatorial election. There are 25 and 6 male and female candidates respectively. The oldest candidate is 72 years old and the youngest is 43 years old.

Number	Candidate		Notes
1	Move Forward Party	Wiroj Lakkhanaadisorn	Member of the House of Representatives (2019–2022)
2	Independent	Thita Rangsitpol Manitkul	Member of the House of Representatives (2001–2005)
3	Independent	Sakoltee Phattiyakul	Deputy Governor of Bangkok (2018–2022)
4	Democrat Party	Suchatvee Suwansawat	President of King Mongkut's Institute of Technology Ladkrabang (2015–2021)
5	Independent	Weerachai Laoruangwattana	
6	Rak Krung Thep Group	Aswin Kwanmuang	Governor of Bangkok (2016–2022)
7	Independent	Rosana Tositrakul	Senator (2008–2014)
8	Independent	Chadchart Sittipunt	Minister of Transport (2012–2014)
9	Independent	Watcharee Wannasri	
10	Independent	Supachai Tantikom	Adviser to the governor of Bangkok
11	Thai Sang Thai Party	Sita Tiwaree	Chairman of the Airports of Thailand Board of Directors (2013–2014)
12	Independent	Prayoon Krongyoth	Deputy Director of the Bangkok Disaster Prevention and Mitigation Department (2017–2020)
13	Independent	Paisal Kittiyaowaman	
14	Independent	Thanet Wongsa	Businessman
15	Independent	Tootpreecha Loetsantatwati	
16	Independent (Sai Jai Group)	Sasikarn Waddhanachan	
17	Independent	Uthen Chatphinyo	
18	Independent	Sumana Phanphairoj	Former director of the Community and Social Welfare Department, Thonburi District Office
19	Palang Sangkhom Mai Party	Kraidech Bunnak	
20	Independent	Amonpan Oonsuwan	
21	Independent	Niphanphon Suwanchana	
22	Independent	Warunchai Chokchana	
23	Independent	Chalermpol Utarat	
24	Independent	Kosit Suwinitchit	Adviser to the Minister of Justice (2020–2022)
25	Independent	Praphat Banjongsiricharoen	
26	Independent	Mongkol Nguenwatthana	
27	Independent	Poompat Atsawapumpin	
28	Independent	Sarawut Benchakul	Chairman of the Airports of Thailand Board of Directors (2020–2022)
29	Thai Citizen Party	Kritchai Phayomyaem	
30	Green Union	Phongsa Chunaem	
31	Independent	Whitthaya Jangkobpatthana	

== Campaigning ==
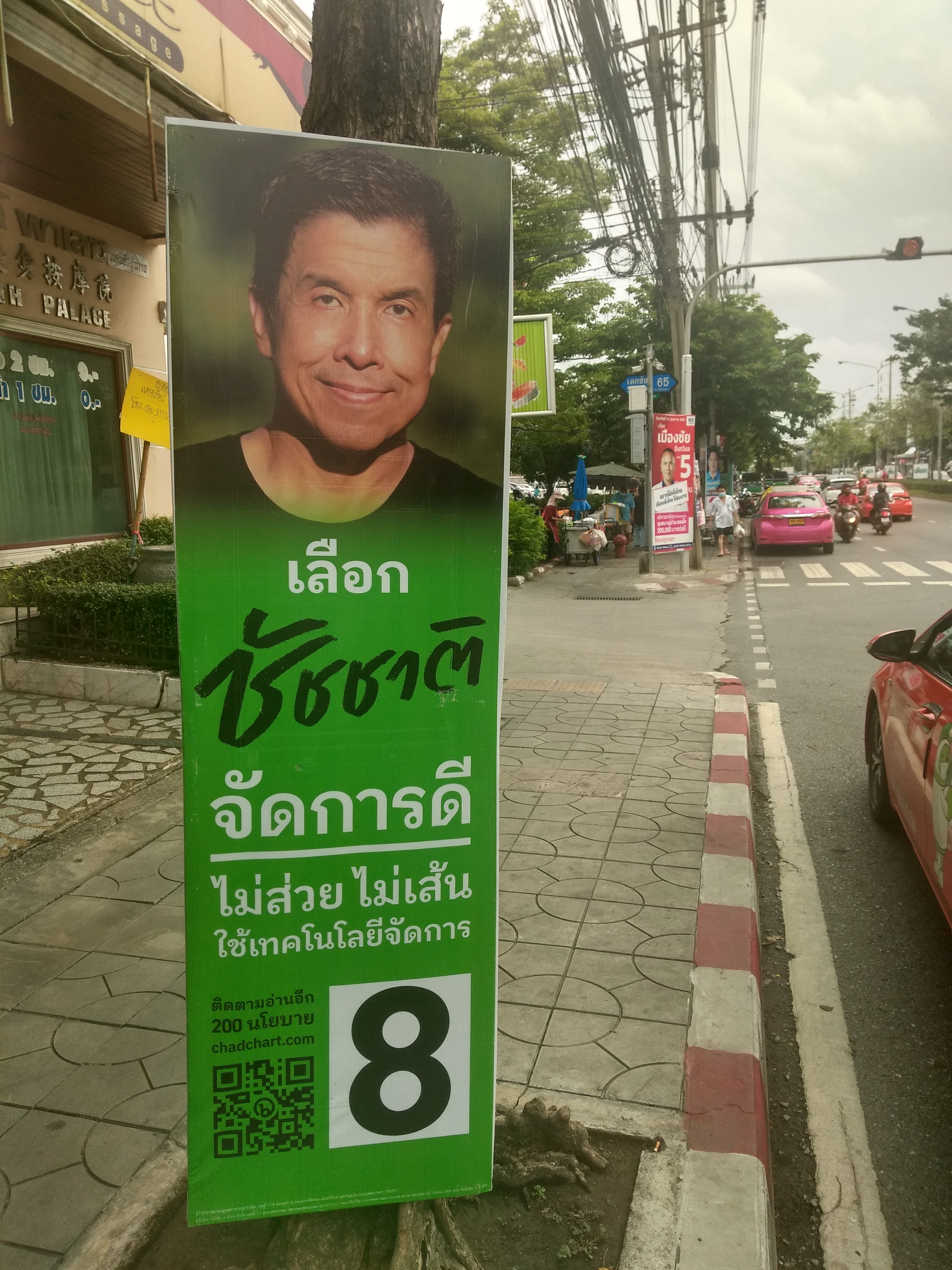
A Chadchart campaign banner in Bang Bon district. Chadchart said that the vinyl banners can later be used to make bags after the election ends.

Chadchart Sittipunt, the former Minister of Transport during Yingluck Shinawatra's government, and Rosana Tositrakul, a former senator, have announced their plans to run for Governor of Bangkok since 2019. Other candidates gradually announced their candidacy starting from the last months of 2021. Like other elections in Thailand, candidates campaign by visiting voters' houses, attaching campaign banners to utility poles or trees, and holding campaign rallies. Several debates were also held in the weeks leading up to the election.

=== Campaign positions ===
Chadchart campaigned on a platform of improving lives of the grassroots population, the environment, the usage of new technology and the economy. Rosana campaigned on dredging canals to improve flood management and employing unemployed people do to so. She also campaigned to encourage the use of more solar panels, designating land for lower-income Bangkokians to do organic farming, and revising city planning and zoning regulations to lessen benefits given to major corporations. Suchatvee campaigned to create a welfare city, build underground flood reservoirs, build laboratory schools in every district, and propose for Bangkok to be the host city of the 2036 Summer Olympics and the 2026 Commonwealth Games co-host with Victoria, Australia. Wiroj campaigned on creating policies to divert more funds to individual communities, repurposing abandoned land into public parks, building public housing in city centres, and quashing bribery in the administration. Aswin Kwanmuang campaigned about flood-prevention measures, solving the issue of there not being enough designated green areas, connect different modes of public transport, and promised to continue the work he had previously done as the incumbent governor of Bangkok. Sakoltee campaigned on using artificial intelligence to solve traffic congestion, create new public transport routes for minor roads, using electric buses, and improving public parks. Sita Tiwaree campaigned on using blockchain technology to improve the quality of administrative processes, improving the quality of BMA schools, encouraging the use of electric vehicles, and employing the use of bounty system to increase citizen participation in law enforcement.

=== Attempts to manipulate voters ===
Almost all opinion polls showed that Chadchart was the leading candidate. As a result, many conservative or anti-Thaksin figures have attempted to manipulate voters and called for voters to vote strategically. Examples include Suthep Thaugsuban, former Deputy Prime Minister, who said that people should elect Sakoltee instead of Chadchart because the latter "received benefits from Thaksinocracy." Major General Nanthadech Mechsawasd, former head of the Special Operations branch of the Armed Force Security Center made a post on Facebook, calling for people who dislike Thaksin Shinawatra to elect Sakoltee and outvote Chadchart. In the last days before the election, Rosana used the same method, and said that people who are loyal to King Bhumibol's guidance would never vote for a corrupt person to be in public office.

A few days before election day, internet users alleged that they received a text message encouraging them to elect Suchatvee, the Democrat Party candidate. The Democrat Party's deputy spokesperson Darunwan Chanpipattanachai denied in an interview that the party was officially involved with the text messages being sent and did not know where they came from.

Prime Minister Prayut Chan-o-cha visited Khlong Ong Ang which was seen as supporting Aswin's campaign for his second term, although an explicit endorsement wasn't made as there were legal limitations on the Prime Minister's part. Additionally, Aswin garnered the support of some Palang Pracharat councillor candidates, who helped him in his campaign.

== Opinion polls ==
=== Preferred governor ===
Fieldwork date(s)	Polling Firm	Sample	Aswin	Chadchart	Rosana	Suchatvee	Wiroj	Sakoltee	Chaktip	Haven't decided	Others	Lead
9 - 10 May 2022	NIDA	1,354	11.37%	45.13%	3.32%	8.94%	9.75%	3.77%	-	9.23%	17.72%	33.76%
27 - 29 April 2022	NIDA	1,357	11.27%	44.58%	2.28%	8.99%	6.93%	3.17%	-	11.42%	11.36%	33.31%
5 - 7 April 2022	NIDA	1,362	10.06%	38.84%	1.98%	6.83%	6.02%	2.28%	-	26.58%	7.41%	28.78%
28 February - 2 March 2022	NIDA	1,313	11.73%	38.01%	3.73%	8.61%	8.83%	-	-	13.40%	15.69%	26.28%
31 January - 2 February 2022	NIDA	1,324	12.09%	37.24%	3.55%	11.03%	8.08%	1.81%	-	5.59%	20.61%	25.15%
23 - 25 December 2021	NIDA	1,317	10.25%	38.80%	3.26%	13.06%	-	1.90%	-	11.85%	19.06%	25.74%
29 November - 1 December 2021	NIDA	1,318	17.07%	34.37%	5.54%	4.86%	-	1.21%	-	11.68%	25.27%	17.30%
1 - 3 November 2021	NIDA	1,320	16.59%	33.18%	5.91%	4.09%	-	1.82%	-	14.09%	24.32%	16.59%
27 - 30 September 2021	NIDA	1,318	9.33%	29.74%	4.10%	3.26%	-	1.29%	13.66%	27.92%	10.70%	16.08%
30 August - 2 September 2021	NIDA	1,317	9.57%	27.71%	4.10%	1.67%	-	0.76%	15.49%	24.60%	12.46%	12.22%
30 June - 2 July 2021	NIDA	1,315	9.58%	26.16%	3.04%	1.37%	-	1.29%	14.60%	27.98%	15.98%	11.56%
31 May - 2 June 2021	NIDA	1,313	10.59%	23.84%	3.43%	2.05%	-	1.14%	12.57%	30.62%	15.76%	11.27%
31 March - 2 April 2021	NIDA	1,316	8.66%	24.77%	2.89%	1.59%	-	0.91%	11.93%	32.67%	16.58%	12.84%
2 - 3 March 2021	NIDA	1,315	7.68%	22.43%	4.26%	3.35%	-	1.75%	15.51%	29.96%	15.06%	6.92%

== Election Day ==
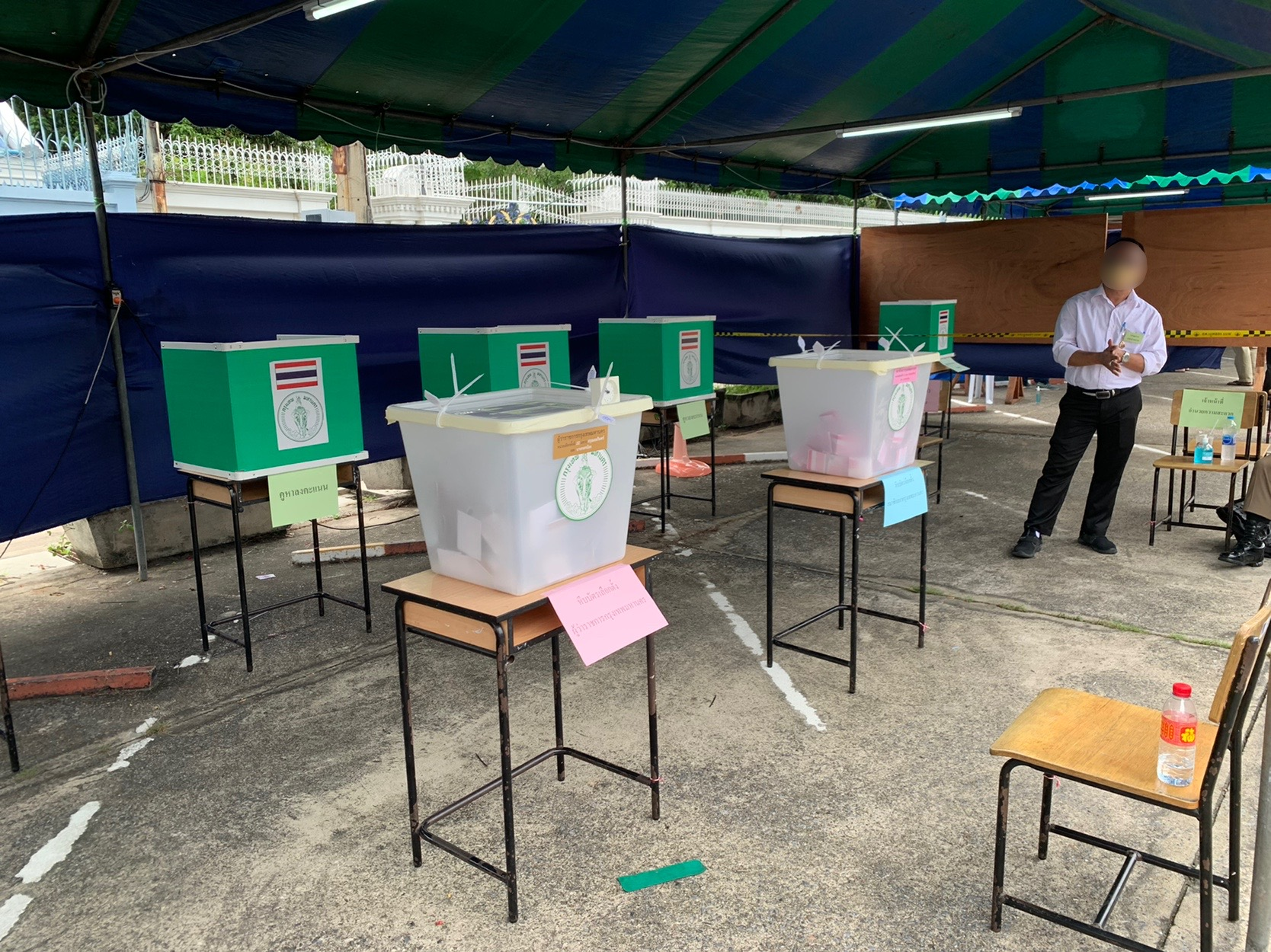
A polling station.

On election day, there were special areas in polling booths designated for people who are infected with COVID-19 pandemic. Temperature checks were performed and hand sanitisers were available. Pens taken from home were allowed for people taking extra precautions against being infected. Polling stations were open from 8 AM to 5 PM. In some spots, people queued up in front of polling stations before they were open such as Krung Thep Aphiwat Central Terminal (formerly Bang Sue Grand Station), where there were 8 polling stations.

During the election, Chairman of the Election Commission Ittiporn Boonprakong told the press that pens having colours other than blue are not allowed, and if found to be used on a ballot it will be considered spoilt. Meanwhile, Permanent Secretary to the BMA and Director of Bangkok Local Elections later clarified that pens of colours other than blue can be used as long as it can be clearly seen on the ballot. The conflict of information generated widespread criticism online.

== Results ==
Candidate	Party	Votes	%
Chadchart Sittipunt	Independent	1,386,215	52.63
Suchatvee Suwansawat	Democrat Party	254,647	9.67
Wiroj Lakkhanaadisorn	Move Forward Party	253,851	9.64
Sakoltee Phattiyakul	Independent	230,455	8.75
Aswin Kwanmuang	Independent (Rak Krung Thep Group)	214,692	8.15
Rosana Tositrakul	Independent	78,993	3.00
Sita Tiwaree	Thai Sang Thai Party	73,720	2.80
Weerachai Laoruangwattana	Independent	20,742	0.79
Thita Rangsitpol Manitkul	Independent	19,847	0.75
Watcharee Wannasri	Independent	8,274	0.31
Kosit Suwinitchit	Independent	3,247	0.12
Prayoon Krongyoth	Independent	2,219	0.08
Supachai Tantikom	Independent	2,189	0.08
Sasikarn Waddhanachan	Independent	2,129	0.08
Warunchai Chokchana	Independent	1,128	0.04
Thanet Wongsa	Independent	1,092	0.04
Sumana Phanphairoj	Independent	908	0.03
Paisal Kittiyaowaman	Independent	868	0.03
Whitthaya Jangkobpatthana	Independent	812	0.03
Uthen Chatphinyo	Independent	756	0.03
Kraidech Bunnak	Palang Sangkhom Mai Party	636	0.02
Tootpreecha Loetsantatwati	Independent	574	0.02
Amonpan Oonsuwan	Independent	558	0.02
Kritchai Phayomyaem	Thai Citizen Party	494	0.02
Praphat Banjongsiricharoen	Independent	460	0.02
Chalermpol Utarat	Independent	431	0.02
Phongsa Chunaem	Green Union	424	0.02
Poompat Atsawapumpin	Independent	391	0.01
Mongkol Nguenwatthana	Independent	360	0.01
Niphanphon Suwanchana	Independent	342	0.01
None of the above		72,227	2.74
Total		2,633,681	100.00
Valid votes		2,633,681	98.50
Invalid/blank votes		40,017	1.50
Total votes		2,673,698	100.00
Registered voters/turnout		4,402,941	60.73

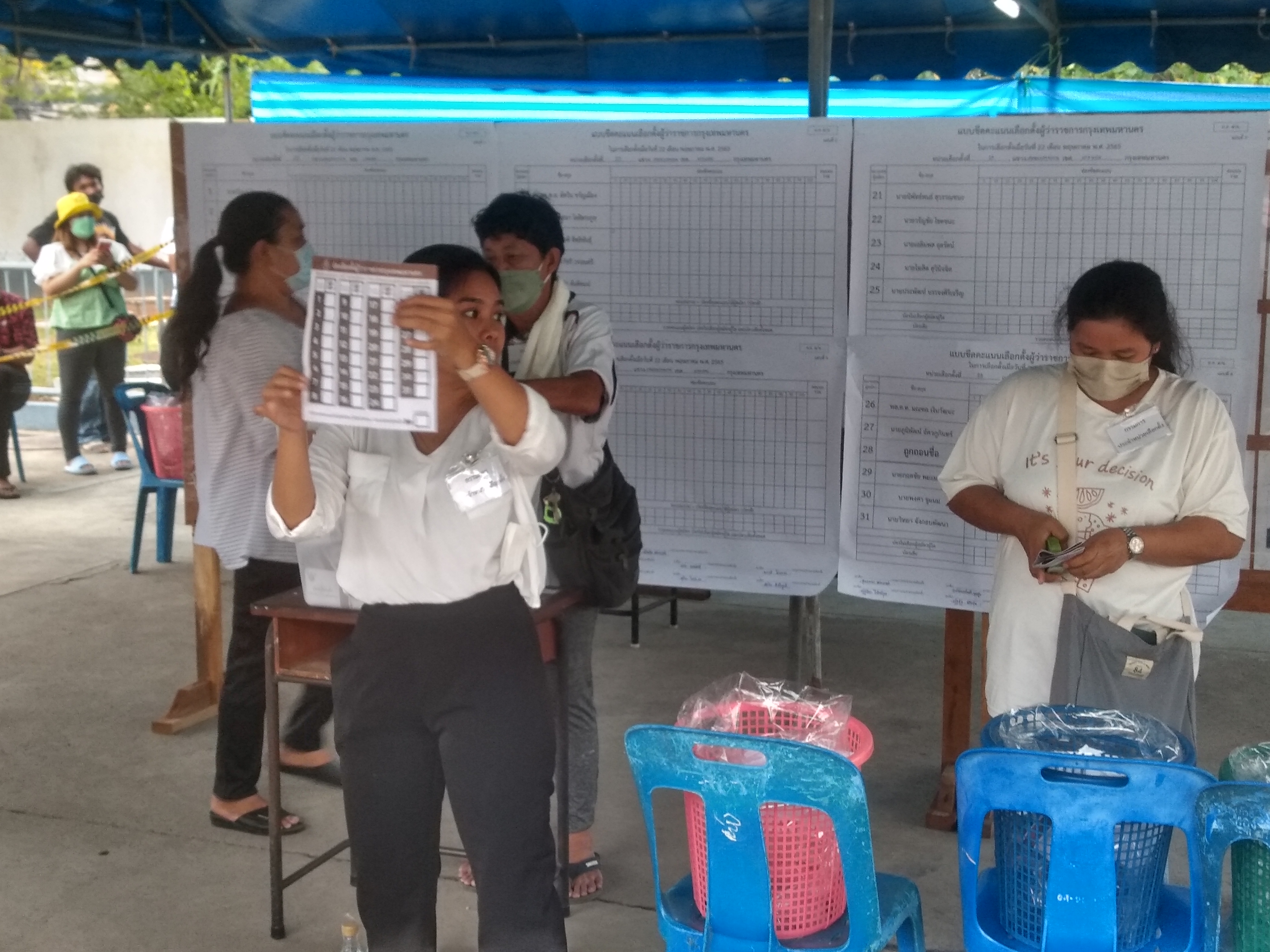
Ballots being counted in a polling station in Bang Bon district.

=== Results by District ===
District	Chadchart		Aswin		Suchatvee		Wiroj		Sakoltee		Others		Total Votes
District	Votes	%	Votes	%	Votes	%	Votes	%	Votes	%	Votes	%	Total Votes
Bang Bon	26,814	55.98%	3,072	6.41%	4,819	10.06%	5,172	10.80%	3,726	7.78%	4,300	8.98%	47,903
Bang Kapi	35,569	53.23%	6,582	9.85%	6,701	10.03%	5,956	8.91%	6,430	9.62%	5,585	8.36%	66,823
Bang Khae	51,361	54.99%	8,728	9.34%	7,574	8.11%	9,881	10.58%	8,219	8.80%	7,645	8.18%	93,408
Bang Khen	56,162	59.91%	6,544	6.98%	7,137	7.61%	8,394	8.95%	8,835	9.42%	6,674	7.12%	93,746
Bang Kho Laem	19,011	51.93%	2,844	7.77%	4,415	12.06%	3,341	9.13%	3,680	10.05%	3,317	9.06%	36,608
Bang Khun Thian	42,725	51.52%	5,689	6.86%	14,268	17.20%	10,467	12.62%	4,016	4.84%	5,768	6.96%	82,933
Bang Na	21,538	55.04%	3,539	9.04%	3,918	10.01%	4,073	10.41%	3,393	8.67%	2,669	6.82%	39,130
Bang Phlat	23,793	52.77%	5,649	12.53%	4,155	9.21%	3,358	7.45%	4,537	10.06%	3,600	7.98%	45,092
Bang Rak	9,314	51.39%	1,398	7.71%	1,960	10.81%	1,326	7.32%	2,724	15.03%	1,401	7.73%	18,123
Bang Sue	31,386	53.96%	7,069	12.15%	4,348	7.48%	6,287	10.81%	5,588	9.61%	3,482	5.99%	58,160
Bangkok Noi	24,146	52.41%	3,953	8.58%	5,936	12.88%	4,264	9.26%	4,240	9.20%	3,532	7.67%	46,071
Bangkok Yai	16,113	52.74%	2,704	8.85%	4,049	13.25%	2,848	9.32%	2,703	8.85%	2,132	6.98%	30,549
Bueng Kum	37,461	55.08%	5,435	7.99%	6,406	9.42%	6,087	8.95%	6,633	9.75%	5,996	8.82%	68,018
Chatuchak	42,527	56.33%	4,569	6.05%	6,538	8.66%	6,972	9.24%	10,085	13.36%	4,801	6.36%	75,492
Chom Thong	38,432	58.95%	4,469	6.86%	4,946	7.59%	6,451	9.90%	5,092	7.81%	5,799	8.90%	65,189
Din Daeng	28,912	53.63%	5,696	10.57%	5,430	10.07%	5,543	10.28%	4,822	8.94%	3,507	6.51%	53,910
Don Mueang	42,033	54.42%	4,659	6.03%	6,591	8.53%	6,992	9.05%	6,215	8.05%	10,746	13.91%	77,236
Dusit	17,575	56.69%	2,356	7.60%	2,173	7.01%	2,965	9.56%	3,416	11.02%	2,518	8.12%	31,003
Huai Khwang	22,223	55.25%	2,974	7.39%	4,711	11.71%	4,067	10.11%	4,012	9.98%	2,232	5.55%	40,219
Khan Na Yao	24,461	56.70%	3,509	8.13%	3,709	8.60%	3,855	8.94%	3,542	8.21%	4,062	9.42%	43,138
Khlong Sam Wa	51,133	54.18%	7,825	8.29%	9,591	10.16%	11,280	11.95%	5,708	6.05%	8,843	9.37%	94,380
Khlong San	16,284	52.10%	2,713	8.68%	3,623	11.59%	2,981	9.54%	3,318	10.62%	2,335	7.47%	31,254
Khlong Toei	20,006	49.81%	3,771	9.39%	3,906	9.73%	3,356	8.36%	3,480	8.66%	5,644	14.05%	40,163
Lak Si	26,203	53.11%	2,979	6.04%	3,536	7.17%	5,318	10.78%	7,407	15.01%	3,895	7.89%	49,338
Lat Krabang	41,922	53.76%	6,250	8.01%	7,576	9.72%	8,529	10.94%	3,326	4.27%	10,379	13.31%	77,982
Lat Phrao	32,422	55.82%	4,135	7.12%	5,730	9.87%	5,508	9.48%	6,478	11.15%	3,810	6.56%	58,083
Min Buri	32,731	48.20%	11,497	16.93%	5,225	7.69%	5,637	8.30%	5,313	7.82%	7,510	11.06%	67,913
Nong Chok	34,061	45.30%	10,099	13.43%	9,259	12.31%	10,293	13.69%	3,282	4.36%	8,198	10.90%	75,192
Nong Khaem	40,298	56.54%	5,827	8.18%	7,248	10.17%	7,972	11.19%	4,057	5.69%	5,871	8.24%	71,273
Pathum Wan	8,873	51.50%	1,793	10.41%	1,982	11.50%	1,483	8.61%	1,841	10.68%	1,258	7.30%	17,230
Phasi Charoen	34,197	57.37%	5,455	9.15%	5,372	9.01%	5,914	9.92%	4,475	7.51%	4,191	7.03%	59,604
Phaya Thai	17,114	53.91%	2,263	7.13%	2,465	7.77%	3,008	9.48%	4,747	14.95%	2,146	6.76%	31,743
Phra Khanong	22,960	54.93%	3,282	7.85%	3,755	8.98%	4,038	9.66%	4,765	11.40%	3,000	7.18%	41,800
Phra Nakhon	10,503	53.12%	1,528	7.73%	2,110	10.67%	1,798	9.09%	2,332	11.79%	1,501	7.59%	19,772
Pom Prap Sattru Phai	9,066	50.27%	1,623	9.00%	2,274	12.61%	1,479	8.20%	2,010	11.15%	1,582	8.77%	18,034
Prawet	42,727	54.02%	4,748	6.00%	11,118	14.06%	8,047	10.17%	7,060	8.93%	5,398	6.82%	79,098
Rat Burana	18,346	53.23%	2,605	7.56%	3,374	9.79%	3,300	9.57%	2,961	8.59%	3,881	11.26%	34,467
Ratchathewi	14,492	56.03%	1,783	6.89%	2,002	7.74%	2,706	10.46%	2,936	11.35%	1,944	7.52%	25,863
Sai Mai	55,215	57.02%	4,852	5.01%	8,700	8.98%	8,248	8.52%	5,251	5.42%	14,566	15.04%	96,832
Samphanthawong	4,630	46.18%	658	6.56%	1,655	16.51%	847	8.45%	1,277	12.74%	959	9.57%	10,026
Saphan Sung	24,467	51.82%	4,756	10.07%	4,844	10.26%	4,469	9.47%	4,899	10.38%	3,777	8.00%	47,212
Sathon	17,165	50.93%	2,522	7.48%	3,376	10.02%	3,136	9.31%	4,567	13.55%	2,936	8.71%	33,702
Suan Luang	29,321	51.92%	4,333	7.67%	6,166	10.92%	5,968	11.08%	6,255	11.08%	4,426	7.84%	56,469
Taling Chan	28,516	56.44%	4,443	8.79%	4,578	9.06%	4,651	9.21%	4,401	8.71%	3,931	7.78%	50,520
Thawi Watthana	22,192	52.69%	3,599	8.54%	4,908	11.65%	3,871	9.19%	4,031	9.57%	3,520	8.36%	42,121
Thon Buri	25,033	54.61%	3,875	8.45%	3,727	8.13%	5,373	11.72%	3,736	8.15%	4,093	8.93%	45,837
Thung Khru	34,398	58.98%	5,376	9.22%	4,899	8.40%	4,347	7.45%	4,369	7.49%	4,932	8.46%	58,321
Vadhana	15,102	50.83%	2,218	7.47%	2,937	9.89%	2,658	8.95%	4,816	16.21%	1,977	6.65%	29,708
Wang Thonglang	28,268	55.24%	3,894	7.61%	4,959	9.69%	4,591	8.97%	5,293	10.34%	4,170	8.15%	51,175
Yan Nawa	17,014	50.66%	2,551	7.60%	3,923	11.68%	3,096	9.22%	4,146	12.35%	2,854	8.50%	33,584
Total	1,386,215	54.12%	214,691	8.38%	254,602	9.94%	252,201	9.85%	230,445	9.00%	223,293	8.72%	2,561,447

=== Result analysis by the media and various figures ===
Election results show that Chadchart won with 1,386,769 votes, the highest in any Bangkok gubernatorial election. Workpoint Today analysed that Chadchart's landslide victory came from several factors, including that he ran as an independent, his policies during his tenure as Minister of Transportation which were sabotaged, a clear vision, his follower number on Facebook which was higher than any other candidate, and that he took two years to prepare for the election. Director of the Office of Innovations for Democracy, King Prajadhipok's Institute Satithorn Thananithichoti opined that people elected Chadchart because they didn't want to see massive change, only the effective administration of the capital such as collecting garbage on time or designating more green areas.

Anusorn Thamjai of the Pridi Banomyong International College, Thammasat University, proposed the idea that this election showed the far-right, anti-democracy groups were weakening in numbers and were not popular within the younger population. Progressive, liberal and pro-democracy ideas, however, are growing more popular. Thitinan Pongsuttirak said that this election is symbolic of the people's dissatisfaction with the government's failures and a country that has been under military rule for so long. Yutthaporn Issarachai analysed that this election will affect the upcoming general election as people are fed up with the current government, of which Thaksin Shinawatra has the same view. However, Thaksin added that Chadchart also received votes from Move Forward Party voters who were voting strategically in hopes of giving Chadchart a landslide.

== Reaction ==
Secretary of the Move Forward Party Chaithawat Tulathon revealed that Wiroj received 2-3 times fewer votes than had been projected, referencing numbers from the 2019 general election, speculating that Bangkokians are not in favour of the party's vision of what the governor should do. Chaithawat said "This is a matter that we can think about later, but there are also people who say that the Move Forward Party is better off working in politics at a national level, but that is not the case. It is because there are people who are ready to elect Move Forward Party councillor candidates but not Wiroj for Governor of Bangkok because the voters expect another vision of who should be the governor, but they will certainly accept Wiroj working in national politics." An unnamed Democrat Party politician says that this election would test Democrat Party Leader Jurin Laksanawisit's theory of Prayut affecting the Democrat Party's electoral prospects. Jurin said in a press conference that the election result was satisfactory for the Democrat Party but Suchatvee's numbers were still lower than what the Democrat Party got in the 2019 general election.

Chadchart said "Today is a very meaningful day for me personally. 8 years ago I was involved in the coup. They put a bag over my head, my hands were tied and I was brought to a location which I did not know because they covered my head both when I was taken there and when I was taken out of there. I'm not angry, vengeful or hateful but rather I am forgiving of the situation that happened. However, it is a memory that constantly reminds me that when people start to have violent disagreements, get angry at one another, there will be a group of people who benefit from that. We can disagree on matters but not get angry at each other. Don't hate each other." Chadchart suggested civil servants in the administration to read policies he proposed on his campaign website. He said that if the civil servants did not listen to what the people want, then they would have a hard time doing their job. When asked if he can work with the government, Chadchart said that more people voted for him than the Prime Minister but he didn't say that to taunt him. He said that he can work with the government per rules and regulations.

Prime Minister Prayut Chan-o-cha said that the election was only for one province and couldn't accurately reflect his or his government's popularity nationwide.
