= Sanambin Subdistrict =

Sanambin สนามบิน
- Khwaeng
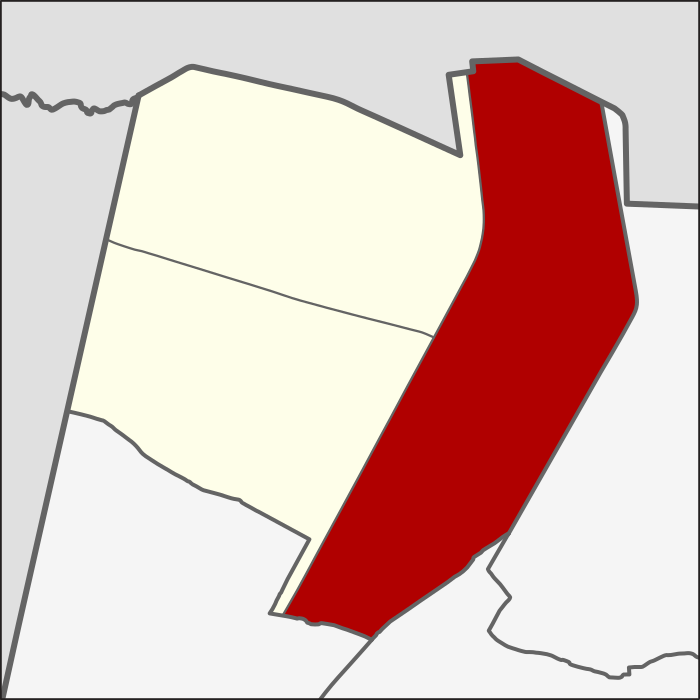
- Location in Don Mueang District
- Country: Thailand
- Province: Bangkok
- Khet: Don Mueang

Area
  - Total: 14.664 km^{2} (5.662 sq mi)

Population (2021)
  - Total: 22,673
- Time zone: UTC+7 (ICT)

Sanambin (Thai: สนามบิน, pronounced [sa.nǎːm.bin]) is a khwaeng (subdistrict) of Don Mueang District, in Bangkok, Thailand. In 2020, it had a total population of 22,673 people.
