= Don Mueang subdistrict, Bangkok =

Don Mueang ดอนเมือง
- Khwaeng
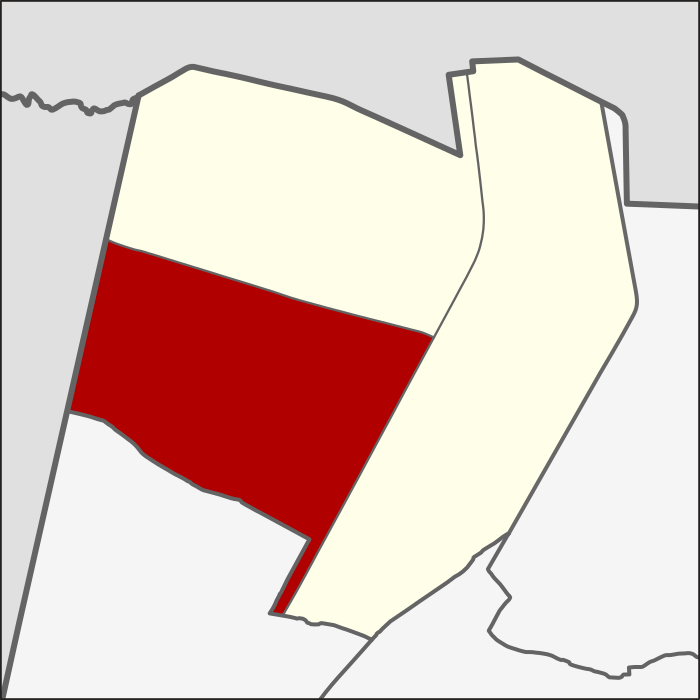
- Location in Don Mueang District
- Country: Thailand
- Province: Bangkok
- Khet: Don Mueang

Area
  - Total: 10.605 km^{2} (4.095 sq mi)

Population (2020)
  - Total: 82,077
- Time zone: UTC+7 (ICT)
- Postal code: 10210
- TIS 1099: 103604

Don Mueang (Thai: ดอนเมือง, pronounced [dɔ̄ːn mɯ̄a̯ŋ]) is a khwaeng (subdistrict) of Don Mueang District, in Bangkok, Thailand. In 2020, it had a total population of 82,077 people.
