= Karun Hosakul =

Thai politician (born 1967)

Karoon Hosakul
- การุณ โหสกุล

Member of Parliament
- In office 3 July 2011 – 9 May 2013
- Prime Minister: Yingluck Shinawatra
- Constituency: Bangkok's 12th district

Personal details
- Born: December 4, 1967 (age 58) Yasothon, Thailand
- Party: Thai Nation (?–2005); Thai Rak Thai (2005–2007); People's Power (2007–2008); Pheu Thai (2008–present)
- Spouse: Phimchana Hosakul
- Children: Phumiphat Hosakul; Phanitha Hosakul; Nattanon Hosakul
- Occupation: Member of Parliament
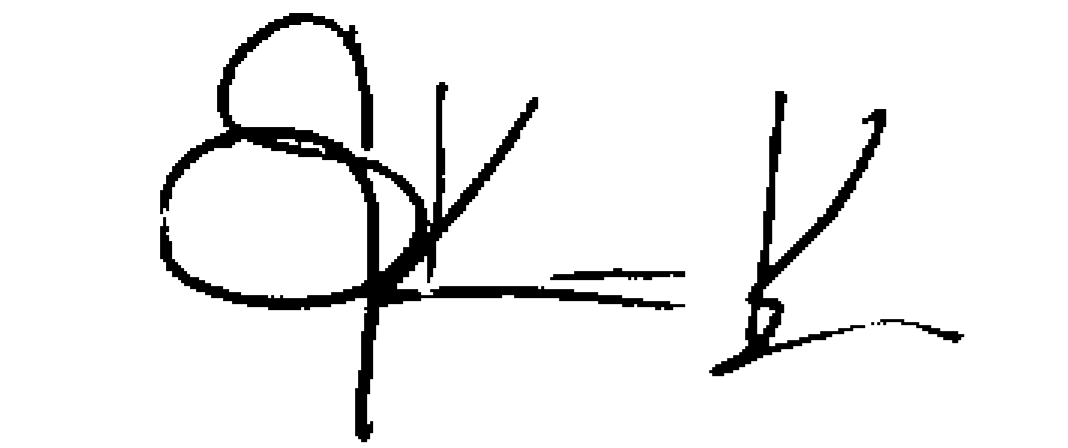
- Signature

Karoon Hosakul (Thai: การุณ โหสกุล; born December 4, 1967, in Yasothon Province) is a Thai politician. He was a prominent politician in Don Mueang, Bangkok. He served as Member of Parliament for the Bangkok 12th district. On 9 May 2013, he was disqualified and banned from politics for five years for defaming rival candidate and party. A by-election was held to replace him.
