= Duangrit Benjathikul Chairungruang =

Thai politician

- ดวงฤทธิ์ เบ็ญจาธิกุล ชัยรุ่งเรือง

Leader of the Bangkok Possible Working Team
- Incumbent
- Assumed office 23 May 2026

Member of the House of Representatives
- In office 14 May 2026 – 12 December 2025

Duangrit Benjathikul Chairungruang (Thai: ดวงฤทธิ์ เบ็ญจาธิกุล ชัยรุ่งเรือง) is a Thai politician and leader of the Bangkok Possible working team. A former party-list MP of the Action Coalition Party, Duangrit launched the "Work Team Making Bangkok Possible" in May 2026.

== Career ==
Duangrit is the leader of the Bangkok Possible group, a coalition of 30 candidates for the 2026 Bangkok Metropolitan Council election. The group aims to institute legislative reform of the Bangkok Metropolitan Council, including increasing public participation, using Traffy Fondue app to inform legislation, and making votes and council documents public.
