= Viput Srivaurai =

Thai politician

- วิพุธ ศรีวะอุไร

Chair of the Bangkok Metropolitan Council
- Incumbent
- Assumed office 31 July 2025
- Preceded by: Surachit Phongsinghvithya

Member of the Bangkok Metropolitan Council for Bang Rak District
- Incumbent
- Assumed office 22 May 2022

Personal details
- Party: Pheu Thai

Viput Srivaurai (Thai: วิพุธ ศรีวะอุไร) is a Thai politician, serving as Chair of the Bangkok Metropolitan Council since 2025.

== Career ==
Viput was elected in 2022 to represent Bang Rak District. In 2024, Viput urgered the BMA to develop a motorcycle taxi hailing app.

In September 2025, Viput led a delegation of Bangkok Metropolitan Council members to Beijing to meet Li Xiuling, Chairman of the Standing Committee of the Beijing Municipal People's Congress.
