= Wiroj Lakkhanaadisorn =

Thai politician (born 1977)

Wiroj Lakkhanaadisorn DM
- วิโรจน์ ลักขณาอดิศร
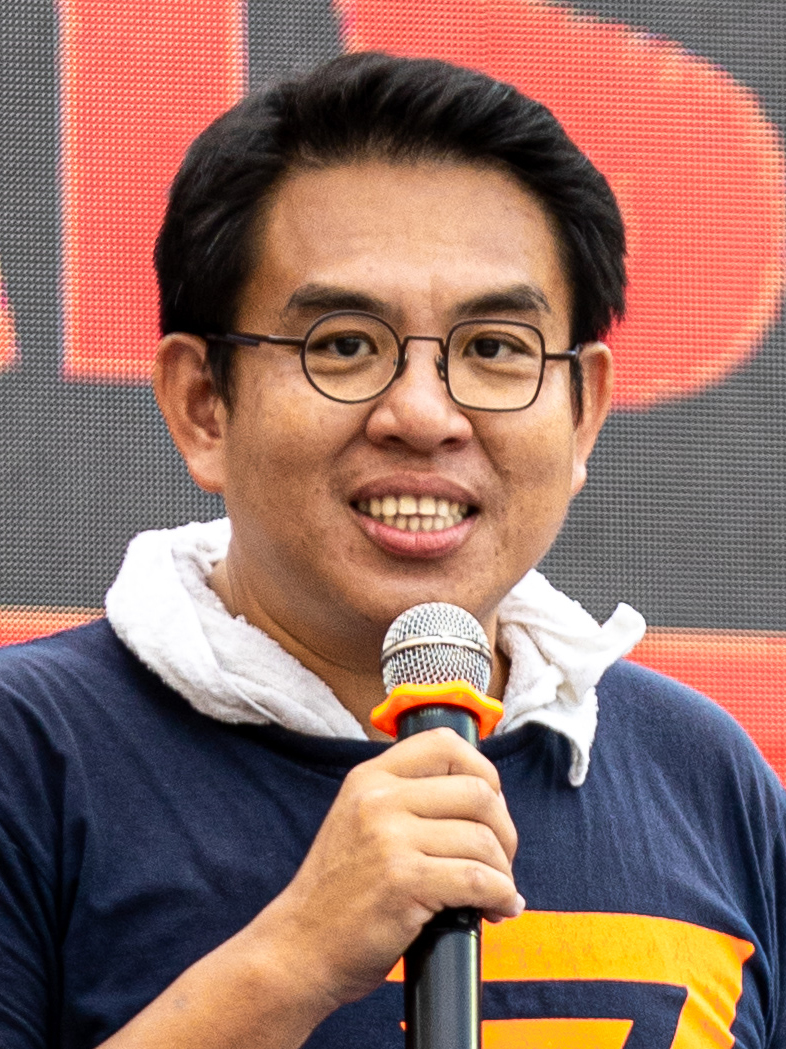
- Wiroj Lakkhanaadisorn in 2023

Chair of the Committee on the Armed Forces
- Incumbent
- Assumed office 5 October 2023
- Preceded by: Somchai Wissanuwongse

Member of the House of Representatives
- Incumbent
- Assumed office 24 March 2019
- Constituency: Party-list

Spokesperson of Move Forward Party
- In office 14 March 2020 – 30 April 2022
- Preceded by: Panneekar Wanich (Spokeswoman of Future Forward Party)
- Succeeded by: Rangsiman Rome

Personal details
- Born: 11 December 1977 (age 48) Bangkok, Thailand
- Party: People's Party (since 2024)
- Other political affiliations: Future Forward (2018–2020) Move Forward (2020–2024)
- Education: Chulalongkorn University (BEng, MBA); National Institute of Development Administration (PhD)
- Occupation: Politician; engineer

Wiroj Lakkhanaadisorn (Thai: วิโรจน์ ลักขณาอดิศร; born 11 December 1977) is a Thai politician who has served as a party-list member of Thai House of Representatives since 2019. He was also the Move Forward Party's candidate for the Bangkok gubernatorial election in 2022. He also served as the former spokesperson of the Move Forward Party.

== Early life ==
Wiroj was born in Bangkok's Yan Nawa area (now separated into Sathon district in 1989) as the eldest son in a middle-class Thai Chinese family. After graduating from Wat Suthiwararam School, he received a bachelor's degree in automotive engineering and an MBA from Chulalongkorn University. He also received a PhD in economics from National Institute of Development Administration (NIDA).

Before entering politics, he was the director of human resources for SE-EDUCATION Public Company Limited, the largest bookstore in Thailand.

== Political career ==
In the 2019 Thai general election, he became a member of parliament on the party list of the Future Forward Party.

When Future Forward was dissolved in 2020 by the Constitution Court, he joined its de facto successor, the Move Forward Party, as party spokesman. In early 2022, he resigned to launch his candidacy for the governorship of Bangkok. Although not elected, he received 253,938 votes (9.5%) for the third place.

He was noted for his fierce and distinctive speech, particularly during the censure debate.
