= Boonyod Sookthinthai =

Thai politician and journalist

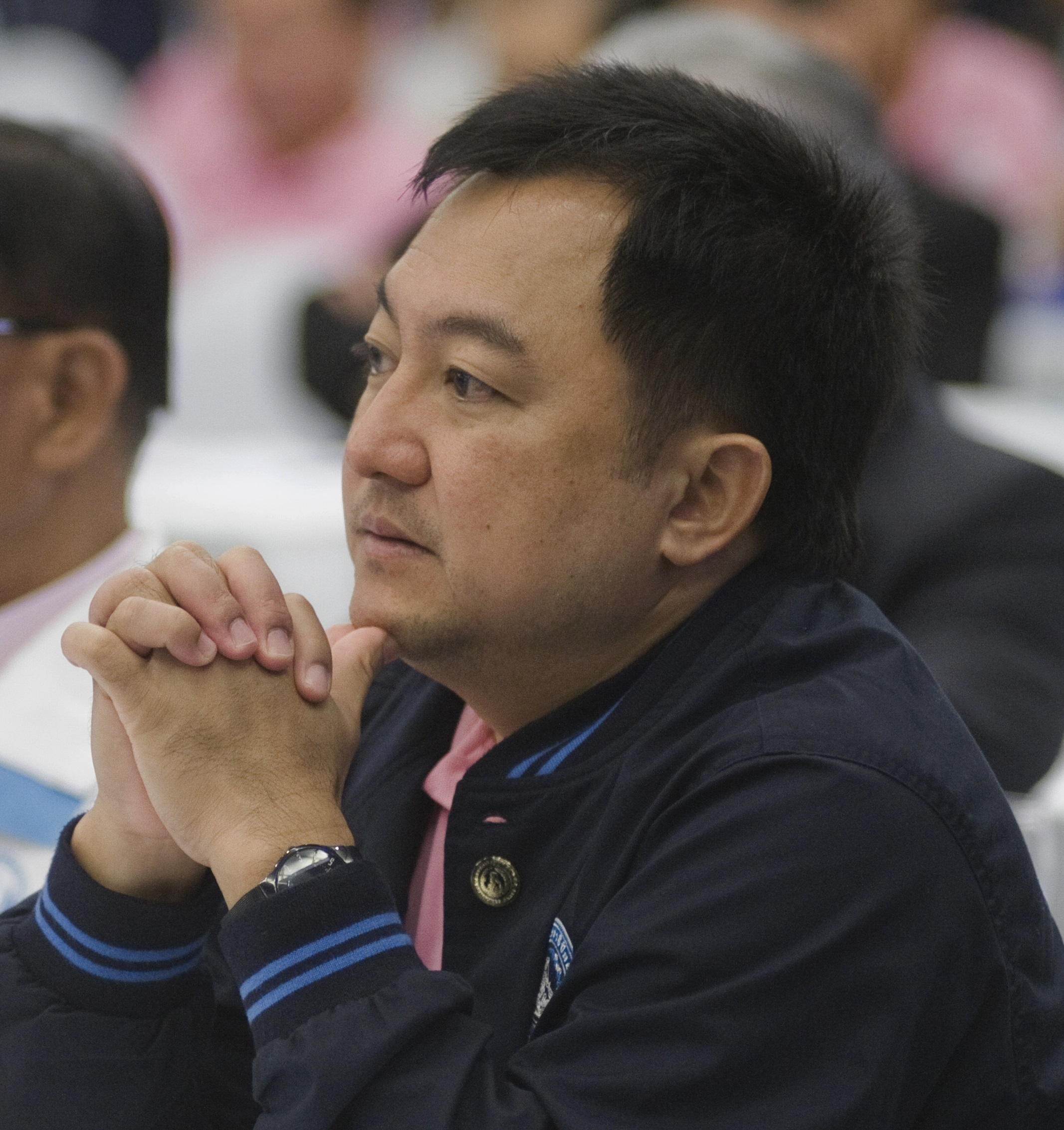
- Sookthinthai in 2010

Personal details
- Born: Boonyod Sookthinthai; September 17, 1965 (age 60) Lat Phrao, Bangkok, Thailand
- Party: Democrat
- Education: Triam Udom Suksa School
- Alma mater: Chulalongkorn University
- Occupation: Politician; journalist
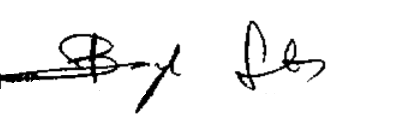
- Signature

Boonyod Sookthinthai (Thai: บุญยอด สุขถิ่นไทย; born September 17, 1965) is a Thai politician, former journalist, news anchor, TV host, and DJ.

== Biography ==
=== Early life and education ===
Sookthinthai was born in a Thai family of Chinese descent. Graduated senior high school from Triam Udom Suksa School and received a bachelor's and master's degree in Communication Arts from Chulalongkorn University.

=== Journalistic career ===
He is known for being a news anchor on several television stations including as a TV and radio host for many years. He was stripped of his role as a Channel 3 news anchor in February 2006, which he believes was due to his criticisms of then-prime minister Thaksin Shinawatra.

=== Political career ===
Since then, so he entered the political circle fully with starting from being elected as Bangkok senator in the April 2006 senator election, the second senator election in Thai politics. Sookthinthai has not yet been certified by the Election Commission, because there was a coup d'état on September 19, 2006 by the Council for Democratic Reform (CDR).

In a general election at the end of 2007, he ran for MP in constituency 4, Bangkok (consisting of districts Lak Si, Bang Sue, Chatuchak, Phaya Thai) belonging to the Democrat Party, along with Atavit Suwannapakdee and Sakoltee Phattiyakul. All three of them were elected.

In the 2011 general election, he was elected as Democrat Party's list of MPs. In the 2019 general election, he ran for the Democrat Party's list of MPs again ranked 42nd, he was not elected.

In 2022, Sookthinthai had his first intention to run as a member of the Bangkok Metropolitan Administration Council (BMC) for Phaya Thai constituency, but then withdrew.
