= Sita Divari =

Thai politician

Squadron Leader Sita Divari PCh PM
- ศิธา ทิวารี
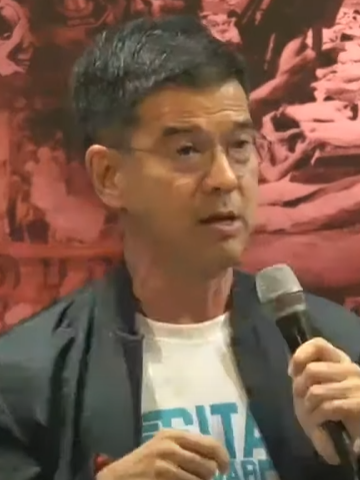
- Sita Tiwaree in June 2022

Government spokesperson
- In office 8 August 2002 – 9 December 2003
- Prime Minister: Thaksin Shinawatra
- Preceded by: Yongyuth Tiyapairat
- Succeeded by: Jakrapob Penkair

Secretary-general of Thai Sang Thai Party
- In office 9 September 2022 – 31 March 2023
- Preceded by: Wallop Chai-thaisong
- Succeeded by: Takorn Tantasith

Personal details
- Born: 6 November 1964 (age 61) Bangkok, Thailand
- Party: Thai Sang Thai (2021–2023)
- Other political affiliations: Thai Rak Thai (1998–2007); Pheu Thai (2008–2020)
- Spouse: Artika Torkaew
- Education: Royal Thai Air Force Academy

Military service
- Branch/service: Royal Thai Air Force
- Rank: Squadron Leader

Sita Divari (Thai: ศิธา ทิวารี) is a former Thai Air Force officer and politician. He is a former spokesperson for the Prime Minister's Office in the government of Prime Minister Thaksin Shinawatra.

== Early life and education ==
Sita Divari was born on 6 November 1964 to Manop Divari and Mom Rajawongse Jaruwan Vorawan, the great-granddaughter of Prince Narathip Praphanphong. He completed primary and secondary education at Saint Dominic School, Upper Secondary from Triam Udom Suksa School and then Armed Forces Academies Preparatory School, Class 24 as the president of the class and a bachelor's degree in science from the Royal Thai Air Force Academy.

== Air career ==
After graduating, he served in the Royal Thai Air Force and became an Northrop F-5 fighter pilot and climbed to the ranks of an F-16 fighter pilot for about 8 years. His last position held, before his resigning from government service to enter political field, was the deputy head of the joint planning department, Policy and Planning Division, Department of Operations, Royal Thai Air Force.

He was head of the Airports of Thailand board of directors (2013–2014).

== Political career ==
After resigning from government service, Sita Divari registered as an election candidate for member of the House of Representatives under the Thai Rak Thai Party. He was an elected representative of Khlong Toei district for 2002 and 2006 elections - under the government of Prime Minister Thaksin Shinawatra, his then party leader - during which, he was appointed as a spokesperson for the Prime Minister's Office and also Deputy Secretary-General to the Prime Minister for Political Affairs.

In 2007, he received a five-year ban from politics - along with other members of the executive committee of the Thai Rak Thai Party, which it self was ordered to be dissolve - as a result from the 2006 political party dissolution case.

After the ban, he joined the Pheu Thai Party and served as the coordinator of the Pheu Thai Party Election Strategy Committee.

Later he resigned from the Pheu Thai Party and joined the Thai Sang Thai Party. He was the Thai Sang Thai Party's candidate for the 2022 Bangkok gubernatorial election, but lost to Chadchart Sittipunt.

== Royal decorations ==
- 2003 – Knight Grand Cross (First Class) Order of the White Elephant.
- 2002 – Knight Grand Cross (First Class) Order of the Crown of Thailand.

Political offices
Preceded by Yongyuth Tiyapairat	Government spokesman 2002–2003	Succeeded by Jakrapob Penkair
Assembly seats
Preceded by Thawin Phraison; Thian Manohorathat; Rattana Anannakin	Members of the House of Representatives for Bangkok, 9th District; 2001–2006	Vacant Title next held by Nanthaphon Wirakunsunthon; Surat Chanphithak; Wilat Chanphithak
