= Murder of Jenjira Ployangunsri =

1998 Thai murder case

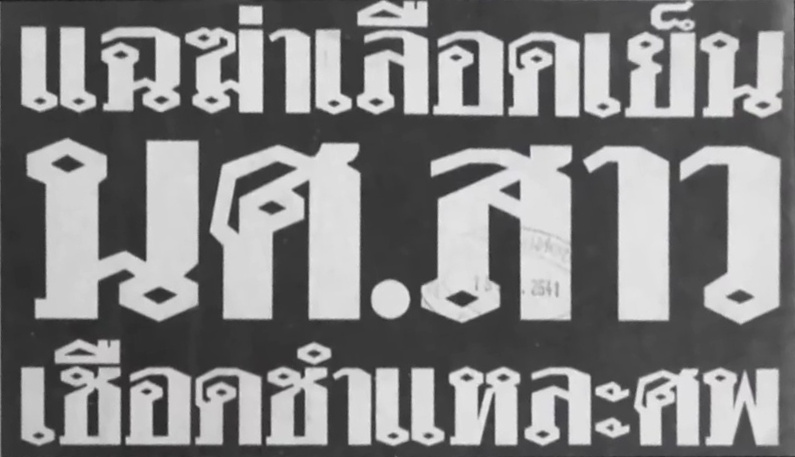
Headline item from Thairath newspaper, crying, "Exposed! Cold-blooded student murder, butchering of body"

The murder of Jenjira Ployangunsri was a sensational crime that took place in Thailand in 1998. Jenjira, a 23-year-old medical student, was killed on 26 January, and her body subsequently dismembered, by her boyfriend Serm Sakhonrat, also a medical student. The case received intense media coverage as the investigation proceeded over the following weeks until Serm was arrested and parts of Jenjira's body were identified. It saw the beginning of the use of DNA forensics in criminal investigation in Thailand and brought public attention to the work of forensic pathologist Porntip Rojanasunan.

== Murder ==
Jenjira Ployangunsri, aged 23, was a fifth-year medical student at the Faculty of Medicine Ramathibodi Hospital in Bangkok in 1998. She had been in a relationship with Serm Sakhonrat, a second-year medical student at the BMA Medical College, who was one year her junior. The two had met a few years earlier at church (both were Catholic), when Serm was an engineering student (he had gained early university admission at the age of 15, and entered medical school after completing his engineering degree).

Jenjira was last seen on 26 January 1998. She and Serm were at his apartment in the Phetchaburi Road area, where he shot her in the head with an illegally owned .38 revolver, killing her. He then dismembered her body using a kitchen knife, and disposed of the flesh and organs by flushing some down the toilet and disposing the rest directly in the apartment's septic tank. He placed the flayed skull, limbs and bones in bin bags, and drove to the Bang Pakong River in Chachoengsao Province, east of Bangkok, where he threw them into the water. The following day, he visited the house of a friend on Charansanitwong Road, in the western Thonburi side of Bangkok, where a witness later reported he spent some time car-washing. The next day, the 28th, he visited his family home in Chon Buri Province, where he burned Jenjira's clothing. He also took Jenjira's car and left it in the Muang Thong Thani neighbourhood in Nonthaburi Province.

== Investigation ==
Locations in the case: (1) Serm's apartment, (2) Charansanitwong neighbourhood, (3) Muang Thong Thani, (4) Bang Pakong River bridge, (5) Chon Buri town centre

Jenjira's parents reported her disappearance to the police on 30 January, and also informed the police of her relationship with Serm, whom they knew. As the last person identified by Jenjira's classmates to have been seen with her, Serm was brought in for questioning. He initially denied knowing of her whereabouts, claiming that they had dinner together at the World Trade Center shopping mall, but left separately after a disagreement. The police remained suspicious of his claims, and followed him and called him in for further questioning several times over the following weeks, also subjecting him to polygraph tests. They found that he provided contradictory and false statements, but failed to find physical evidence in his apartment, where he continued to live.

The police eventually tracked down the witnesses who reported on Serm's suspicious activities at his friend's house and his Chon Buri home, and brought him into custody on 5 March. He confessed to killing Jenjira, claiming to have strangled her in her car at the mall in a fit of jealousy, and then, in fear of being caught, checked in to a love motel where he dismembered and disposed of her body through the toilet. He revealed the locations where he left her car, which was found by the police, and where he disposed of the bones, though police scuba divers were unable to find any remains. However, the investigation team was informed by the Institute of Forensic Medicine (IFM) of two unidentified human skulls earlier found in the river and reported to the local police. Craniofacial superimposition of one of the skulls, which had been found by fishermen on 28 January, found it compatible with Jenjira's features, and dental identification and DNA analysis would later confirm that the skull was Jenjira's. However, the skull exhibited a gunshot wound, contradicting Serm's statements. Investigation of the motel's septic tank also failed to reveal any evidence. Following further interrogation, Serm altered his confession twice over the few following days, first revealing that he killed Jenjira and dismembered her body at his own apartment, then that he used a gun to kill her, which he hid at his Chon Buri home. The gun was recovered, and investigations of the apartment's septic tank revealed numerous pieces of human flesh, which were found to match Jenjira's DNA.

The case was the first instance in Thailand of forensic DNA analysis being used in a murder investigation. A lot of public attention fell on forensic pathologist Porntip Rojanasunan, whose riotous hairstyle became a sensation amidst the intense media coverage of the investigation. The case had been brought to her attention as a lecturer at Ramathibodi who was overseeing student issues, and as Ramathibodi's forensic unit regularly collaborated with the police IFM, she served as a liaison who brought on the capabilities of DNA experts from Ramathibodi's pathology department. The case introduced the Thai public to the field of forensic medicine, and Porntip became a celebrity and one of the field's foremost public faces. It also marked a turning point that would lead Porntip to push for the creation of the Central Institute of Forensic Science under the Ministry of Justice.

== Trial and conviction ==
The Supreme Court judgement of the case

As the case was brought to trial in 1999, Serm recanted his confession to the police, claiming that it had been made under duress. Coincidentally, however, two snakes entered the roof space at the Charansanitwong house of Serm's friend, leading to the discovery of a bag containing Jenjira's belongings that had been hidden there, and Serm subsequently pleaded guilty. He was convicted of premeditated murder, unnecessarily firing a gun in an urban area, destruction of a corpse, theft of property, and possessing a firearm licensed to another. He received the death penalty, which was commuted to life imprisonment for his confession.

The case was appealed by Jenjira's mother and Serm, and the Court of Appeal found the murder to also have been committed in a cruel manner, passing the same sentence. The case was brought to the Supreme Court, where the prosecution argued against the sentence reduction while Serm's defence argued that the act was committed in the heat of passion due to being provoked by Jenjira's wanting to end their relationship. The court's judgement in October 2003 overturned the Court of Appeal's decision, but found Serm's defence untenable as it unsatisfactorily explained how he could have committed the crime and disposed of the body undetected had the murder not been planned. The Supreme Court reinstated the Court of First Instance's conviction and the sentence of death commuted to life imprisonment.

In its judgement, the Supreme Court included in its opinion a consideration of the meaning of love:

Love arises from the heart. It cannot be forced. True love is goodwill towards the one a person loves, gladness when that one is glad, forgiveness when that one does wrong, and sacrifice of one's own happiness for that one's sake. The Defendant wished to take possession of the Deceased for his own sake. When refused, he killed her. These were thoughts and acts of selfishness and covetousness by the Defendant, with no heed given to the Deceased's heart and feelings. This was not love.

The judgement has become famous for its consideration of the subject, and has been described as one of the most romantic passages found in a court opinion. It is often quoted in popular media, especially on Valentine's Day.

Serm served his sentence at Bang Kwang Central Prison, where he was classified as an excellent inmate for his behaviour. He was included in five mass royal pardons which commuted his sentence to thirteen years and five months, and was released in December 2011, aged 35. He completed a law degree from Sukhothai Thammathirat Open University while in prison, but his application to the Thai Bar Association was rejected due to his conviction.

== Motives ==
The case attracted intense public interest and media coverage, and the gruesome nature of the crime generated much discussion and speculation over Serm's motives and mental status. In an interview while in prison, as during the trial, Serm maintained that he had discovered that Jenjira was cheating on him, and as he confronted her that day they had a heated argument and he lost self-control over his anger. He claimed that he had always kept the gun, which previously belonged to his late father, in his room for self-defence because the neighbourhood was not safe (though this point of defence was deemed untenable by the courts).

While the public and the media debated whether Serm's actions were indicative of psychopathy, psychosis, or other psychiatric conditions, psychiatric assessments found him mentally sound and competent to stand trial. Professionals involved in the investigation including Porntip and police inspector Sakchai Suwannukun noted in later interviews that they found it plausible that Serm's dismembering of the body, while shocking to the public, was motivated purely as an attempt to conceal evidence.
