= Rosana Tositrakul =

Thai politician

- รสนา โตสิตระกูล
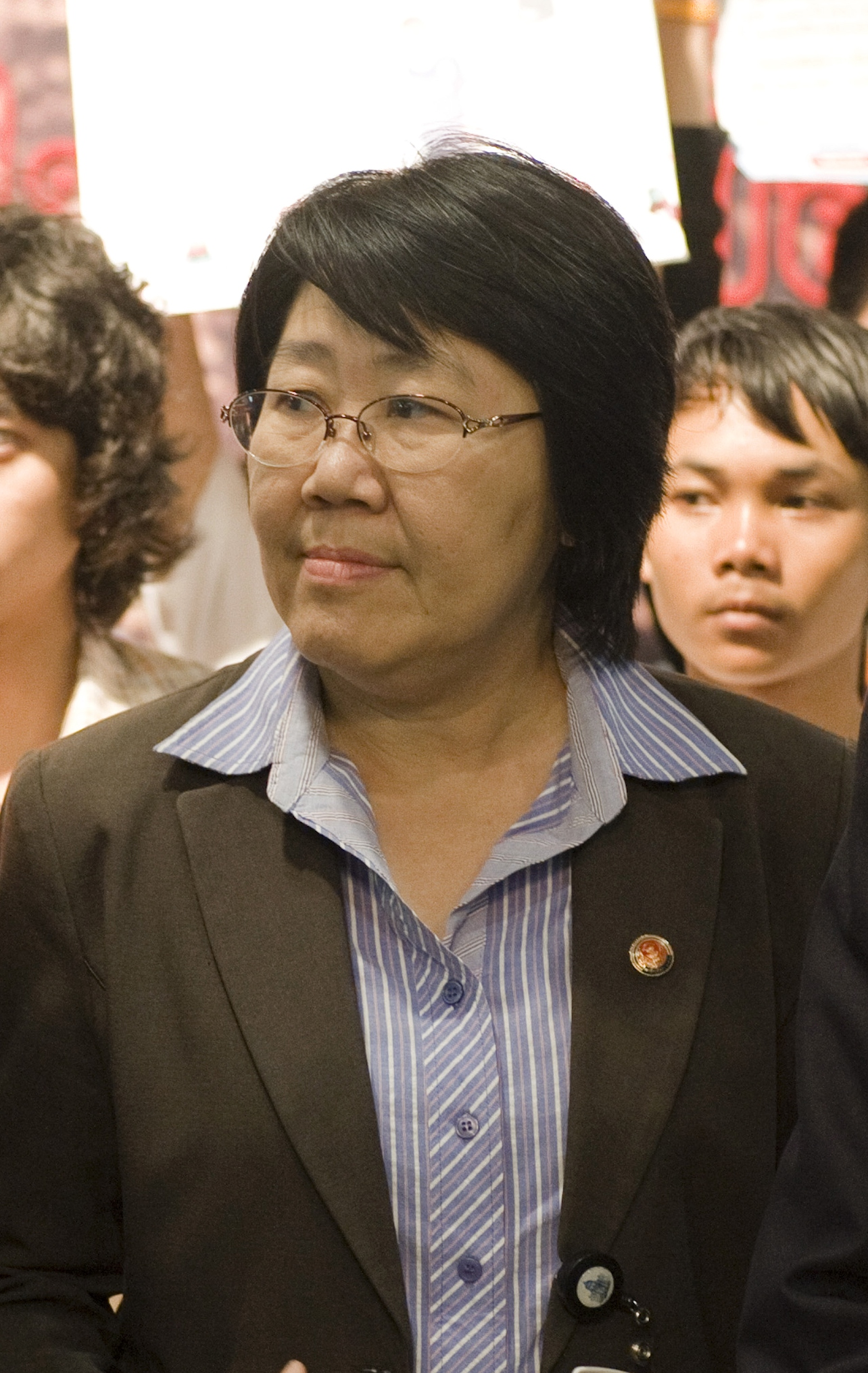
- Rosana Tositrakul in 2010
- Born: 27 September 1953 (age 72); Bangkok, Thailand
- Education: Thammasat University
- Occupations: NGOs; politician
- Years active: 2006–present

Rosana Tositrakul (Thai: รสนา โตสิตระกูล; born 27 September 1953) is a Thai politician and former Senator for Bangkok. She was first elected in 2006, only to find the polls scrapped by a military coup. She was voted into office a second time in 2008 with over 740,000 votes. In 2019, she announced her intention to contest in the 2022 Bangkok gubernatorial election as an independent candidate.

== Early life and education ==
Rosana graduated from secondary school from Mahaprutharam Girls' School and a bachelor's degree from the Faculty of Journalism and Mass Communication at Thammasat University in 1974.

== Activist work ==
After graduating from Thammasat University, Rosana formed the NGO "Traditional Medicine for Self-Curing", later renamed the "Thai Holistic Health Foundation". She spent a year studying with Masanobu Fukuoka, the developer of natural farming, and helped introduce organic farming to Kut Chum District, Yasothon Province. She studied medicinal plants in the district and helped form the "Natural Medication and Herb Interest Group" there.

Rosana worked for many years as a women's rights activist for the Thai Health Foundation, calling for the resignation of Rakkiat Sukthana on corruption charges. She also called for the resignation of Purachai Piumsomboon over a supposed cover-up of the spread of bird flu in Thailand.

She represented a coalition of over 30 NGOs in an appeal against a government plan to establish special economic zones around Thailand.

She is an Independent candidate in the 2022 Bangkok gubernatorial election. but not elected

== Religious views ==
Rosana Tositrakul has stated she has no political leanings. Instead, she advocates what she calls an "engaged" form of Buddhist feminism.

== Royal decorations ==
- 2014 - Knight Grand Cordon (Special Class) Order of the White Elephant.
- 2022 - Knight Grand Cordon (Special Class) Order of the Crown of Thailand.
- 2015 - Companion (Fourth Class) Order of the Direkgunabhorn.
