= R Airlines =

Charter airline of Thailand (2012–2018)

R Airlines อาร์ แอร์ไลน์
IATA	ICAO	Call sign
RK	RCT	GREEN SKY
- Founded: October 2012
- Commenced operations: 24 January 2013
- Ceased operations: 18 February 2018
- Hubs: Don Mueang International Airport
- Fleet size: 1
- Destinations: charter
- Headquarters: Don Mueang district, Bangkok, Thailand
- Key people: Rachot Pisitbunnakorn (President)
- Website: www.skyviewairways.co.th

R Airlines, legally incorporated as Skyview Airways Co. Ltd., was a Thai charter airline headquartered in the Don Mueang District, Bangkok and based out of nearby Don Mueang International Airport. It ceased operations on 18 February 2018.

== History ==
The airline was founded in October 2012 and commenced operations on 24 January 2013. It ceased operations on 18 February 2018.

== Destinations ==
R Airlines operated to the following destinations within Thailand before the suspension of operations:

- Bangkok – Don Mueang International Airport (Primary Hub)
- Chiang Mai – Chiang Mai International Airport
- Hat Yai – Hat Yai International Airport
- Khon Kaen – Khon Kaen Airport
- Narathiwat – Narathiwat Airport
- Phitsanulok – Phitsanulok Airport
- Phuket – Phuket International Airport

== Fleet ==
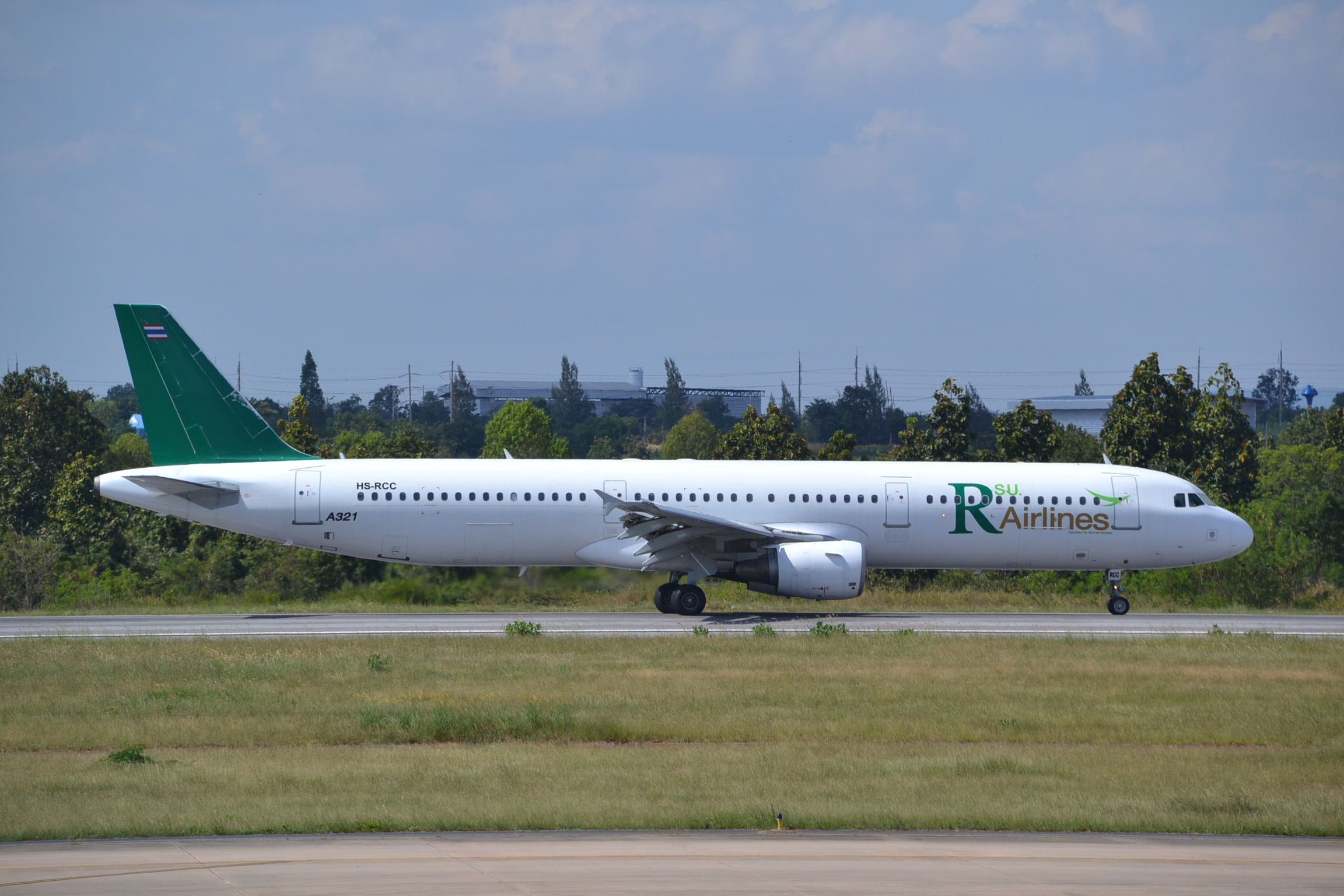
R Airlines Airbus A321-200

During its six-year existence, R Airlines operated the following aircraft:

R Airlines Fleet
Aircraft	In service	Orders	Passengers	Notes
Airbus A321-200	1	—	220	
Total	1			
