= Porntip Rojanasunan =

Thai doctor and politician

Khunying Pornthip Rojanasunand MPCh MVM MC ChBh KNO
- พรทิพย์ โรจนสุนันท์
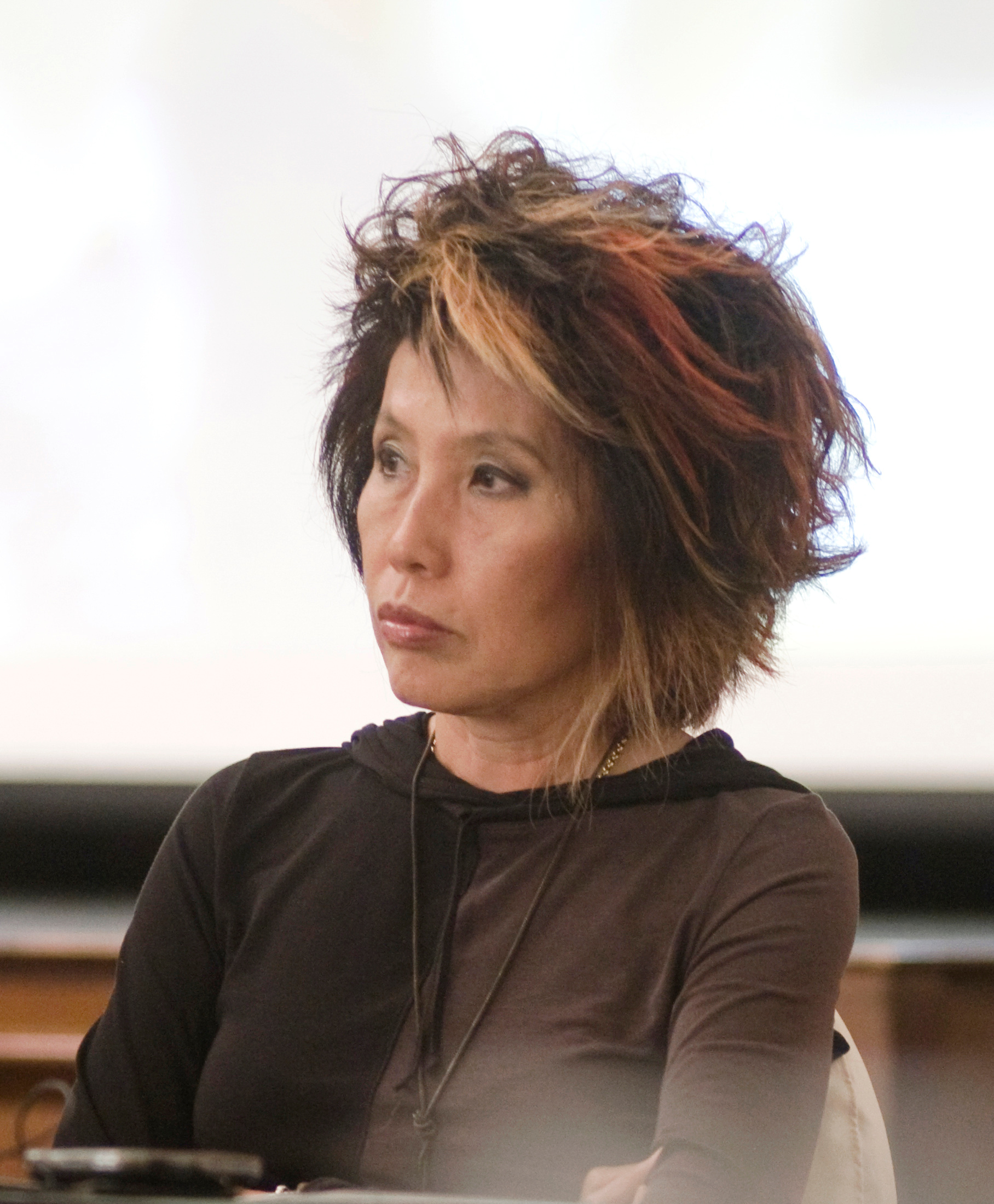
- Pornthip at a press conference of the Center for the Resolution of the Emergency Situation, Government House, on 29 May 2010

Member of the Senate of Thailand
- In office 11 May 2019 – 10 July 2024

Director-General of Central Institute of Forensic Science
- In office 22 December 2013 – 17 June 2014
- Preceded by: Anek Yomjinda
- Succeeded by: Supoj Nak-ngernthong
- In office 2 May 2008 – 29 May 2013
- Preceded by: Chumsak Pruksapong
- Succeeded by: Anek Yomjinda

Personal details
- Born: Pornthip Sonsiwichai; 21 December 1954 (age 71) Bangkok, Thailand
- Spouse: Wichai Rojanasunand
- Children: Yarawi Rojanasunand
- Education: Faculty of Medicine Ramathibodi Hospital, Mahidol University
- Occupation: Forensic pathologist

Khun Ying Pornthip Rojanasunand, also spelled Porntip Rojanasunan (Thai: พรทิพย์ โรจนสุนันท์; RTGS: Phonthip Rotchanasunan; born 21 December 1954) is a Thai forensic pathologist, a former member of the Senate of Thailand and medical doctor. First appearing in the media in 1998, her work and outlandish hairstyles quickly granted her celebrity status, and she became the best known of Thailand's forensic scientists. An author of several best-selling memoirs, her work introduced the Thai public to the role of DNA evidence, among other forensic methods, in crime investigations.

High-profile cases Pornthip was involved in include the murder of Jenjira Ploy-angunsri in 1998, her controversial re-examination of the death of Hangthong Thammawattana in 2003 (which was later disputed by other forensic physicians), and the identification of victims in the 2004 Indian Ocean tsunami (for which she was both commended and criticised). She frequently criticised the Royal Thai Police over their handling of forensic evidence, and was influential in the establishment of the Central Institute of Forensic Science, which works independently of the police and reports directly to the Ministry of Justice, and of which she served as director.

For her work, Pornthip was awarded the Order of Chula Chom Klao in 2003, granting her the title Khunying (equivalent to Lady). However, she has also been criticised for using her position for self-promotion, as well as supporting the use of fake GT200 bomb detectors, which became a scandal in 2010. She has also been subjected to several defamation lawsuits due to her comments to the press, and was once put on probation by the Medical Council for revealing case information.

== Early life ==
As a child she had interests in forensics because both of her parents worked in the field. She was sent to an American boarding school, and after finishing boarding school she wanted to be an interior designer. However her father wanted her to become a doctor. Her forensic career started with an internship by studying forensic medicine, and performing autopsies. Pornthip is very proud of her work and that it "ensures her a place in heaven."

== Government service ==
Graduating from the Faculty of Medicine, Mahidol University, in 1979, Pornthip became a medical officer in the Ministry of Public Health. She held several positions in the Ministry, all dealing with pathology. In 2001, Pornthip was transferred to the Ministry of Justice to hold concurrently the positions of Director of the Medical Division at the Central Youth Detention Centre and Ministerial Spokesman.

She next served as deputy director (9th Class Administrative Officer) of the Central Institute of Forensic Science, Ministry of Justice, since 2003, and was promoted to Director (10th Class Administrative Officer) by Prime Minister Samak Sundaravej in 2008.

Pornthip's four-year term as CIFS Director expired in April 2012, and her term was extended for one more year. However, Yingluck Shinawatra's Council of Ministers removed her from the office in May 2013. Pornthip was appointed Inspector General of the Ministry of Justice.

Her removal was effective immediately and without any advance notice, while Pornthip was carrying out her official functions in the People's Republic of China. Pornthip felt her removal was motivated by politics, since some politicians might have been upset with her work. A number of experts agreed with her, citing Pornthip's conflicts with the Royal Thai Police, which had caused her and her team to be barred from working in central Thailand and being sent to work in the south instead.

Following the June 2013 murder of Akeyuth Anchanbutr, an outspoken critic of Yingluck's government, Pornthip was asked by the public to examine the case. However, she said she no longer had any authority to deal with such cases. Asked about her duties as Inspector General, she said they consisted of "only reviewing official papers".

== Career ==
Pornthip first attracted widespread media attention when she investigated the murder of Jenjira Ploy-angunsri in 1998. She rapidly became a celebrity pathologist and published a memoir, Seub Jaak Sop ("Investigating Corpses").

After the 2004 Indian Ocean earthquake, Pornthip supervised the effort to identify the tsunami victims in the Phang Nga region. She and her team were widely praised for their hard work and dedication, but on 13 January 2005 Police General Nopadol Somboonsab complained that the police's identification centre in Phuket should have charge of all identification operations. Pornthip attributed the intervention to Nopadol's supposed personal vendetta against her. Nopadol was ultimately successful, and the Phang Nga operation was closed down on 3 February 2005. Her life story and her work in Phang Nga were documented in the 2004 National Geographic documentary Crime Scene Bangkok.

In June 2009, she was one of the pathologists investigating the death of actor David Carradine.

In October 2009, she concluded that Malaysian Democratic Action Party employee Teoh Beng Hock, who had been detained by the Malaysian federal Government's Malaysian Anti-Corruption Commission had an 80% probability of having been being murdered.

In April 2010, she was appointed to the Center for the Resolution of the Emergency Situation or CRES (previously known as the Centre for the Administration of Public Order), a military organization charged with maintaining peace and order within Bangkok and the surrounding provinces during the massive anti-government protests in 2010. Dozens of protestors were killed and thousands injured in the CRES-ordered crackdown.

== Jenjira Ploy-angunsri murder investigation ==
After returning from her internship in Bangkok she come back to mystery involving a medical student who was missing for two weeks. The person police suspected to have had committed the crime was another medical student. After being interrogated by police the medical student confessed to the murder and claimed that he had done the crime in a hotel room. After that the Thai police closed the investigation but Rojanasunand had doubts about the story the medical student gave. She then re-interrogated the medical student and he changed his story from the one that he gave to the investigators. Then after her interrogation the government thought that she had made them look bad because of their decision to close the murder case after the first interrogation.

== GT200 "bomb detectors" ==
Pornthip was a vocal and sustained supporter of the GT200, a "remote substance detector" that Pornthip and the UK manufacturer claimed could detect from a distance various substances including explosives and dead bodies. Several nations have found the devices to be fraudulent.

2008 clashes between police and the Peoples Alliance for Democracy resulted in one death and several serious injuries, but much confusion as to whether the injuries were caused by police tear gas grenades or improvised explosive devices carried by the protesters. Pornthip used a GT200 device to conclude that the protester injuries were not caused by explosives and concluded that tear gas grenades caused the injuries, leading to the removal from office of the national police chief. Queen Sirikit later attended the funeral of the fatality.

In the early months of the Democrat-led government of Abhisit Vejjajiva, western news agencies broke the news that up to 1,000 Rohingya Muslim refugees from Myanmar had been captured by the Thai Navy, beaten, then towed out to sea without engines or navigational aids and with little food and water. The scandal and subsequent government cover-up sparked global criticism of the Thai military and Abhisit. The Thai military asked Pornthip to investigate some refugee boats that had landed on Thailand's Andaman coast. Pornthip found "substances and chemicals found that can be used in explosives" in one of the boats, leading the military to link the refugees to Islamic insurgency in the South of Thailand.

Large protests against the Democrat-led government were held in Bangkok in 2009, prompting a violent crackdown. Rumours of widespread killings were denied by the government, which pointed to the lack of bodies. When shipping containers rumoured to be filled with skeletons were found sunken off several coastal areas, Pornthip was assigned to help with the forensics. She suggested that rather than opening up the containers, GT200 bomb detectors using dead body "sensor cards" should be used.

When news of the fraudulent nature of the GT200 devices became public in 2010, Pornthip defended the use of the devices, even if they were proven ineffective. She noted, "I do not feel embarrassed if the bomb detector is proven ineffective. Personally, I have never handled the device myself. But my people have used it and it is accurate every time. Long long time ago, people believed that the Earth is flat and anyone who said otherwise faced execution. Things which are not visible does not necessarily mean they do not exist."

== Media personality ==
A media personality and the most famous pathologist in Thailand, Pornthip often appears on television sporting her unorthodox style: punk-rock hair dyed purplish red, eccentric clothing, and glittery eye makeup, and platform shoes.

The Thai English-language newspaper The Nation chose Pornthip, along with Chote Wattanachet and brothel-tycoon Chuwit Kamolvisit as persons of the year for 2003.

She was awarded the Order of Chula Chom Klao (fourth degree) and the honorific "Khunying" in 2003.

Her wax statue has been displayed at Madame Tussauds in Bangkok since 2009, along with the statues of Kukrit Pramoj and Silpa Bhirasri. In 2023, a video of Rojanasunan visiting Iceland sparked a controversy because it showed her being kicked out of a Thai restaurant for being a Senator.

== Royal decorations ==
Porntip has received the following royal decorations in the Honours System of Thailand:

- 2003 - Member of the Most Illustrious Order of Chula Chom Klao (MC)
- 2013 - Knight Grand Cordon of the Most Exalted Order of the White Elephant (MPCh)
- 2008 - Knight Grand Cordon of the Most Noble Order of the Crown of Thailand (MVM)
- 2017 - Companion of the Most Admirable Order of the Direkgunabhorn (ChBh)
- 2010 - The Border Service Medal (ChD)
- 2005 - Chakrabarti Mala Medal (RChB)

=== Foreign honours ===
- Sweden:
  - 2005 - Commander of the Royal Order of the Polar Star (KNO)

== Published work ==
- Rōtčhanasunan, Phō̜Nthip (2011). The Dead do Talk. Marshall Cavendish International. ISBN 978-9814302739.
