= Surachit Phongsinghvithya =

Thai politician

- สุรจิตต์ พงษ์สิงห์วิทยา

Chair of the Bangkok Metropolitan Council
- In office 6 June 2024 – 31 July 2025
- Succeeded by: Viput Srivaurai

Member of the Bangkok Metropolitan Council for Lat Krabang District
- Incumbent
- Assumed office 22 May 2022

Personal details
- Party: Pheu Thai

Surachit Phongsinghvithya (Thai: สุรจิตต์ พงษ์สิงห์วิทยา) is a Thai politician, serving as Chair of the Bangkok Metropolitan Council since 2024. Surachit is also a Member of the Council, representing Lat Krabang district since 2022.

== Career ==
Surachit has overseen the expansion of Bangkok's partnerships with other global cities, including London, Miami, and Honolulu.

On 3 July 2025, 25 members of the Council submitted a motion to elect a new chair. The motion will be included on the agenda of the next Council session.

On 24 July 2025, the Bangkok Post reported that Surachit is expected to resign from his role as Chair on 29 July 2025. He is expected to be succeeded as Chair by Kanoknuch Klinsung, a councilwoman representing Don Mueang district from the Pheu Thai Party.
