= Hangthong Thammawattana =

Thai businessman and politician (1949–1999)

- Born: 20 November 1949
- Died: 6 September 1999 (aged 49); Bang Khen district, Bangkok, Thailand
- Cause of death: Gunshot
- Occupations: Businessman, politician
- Known for: Unsolved death

Hangthong Thammawattana (Thai: ห้างทอง ธรรมวัฒนะ, also spelled Tumwattana; 20 November 1949 – 6 September 1999) was a Thai businessman and politician. He was the second eldest son of the Thammawattana family, which had been involved in a long-running inheritance dispute; Hangthong became head of the family following his mother's death in 1990 and eldest brother's forced disappearance in 1991. He entered politics and was elected to the House of Representatives in 1995, representing Bangkok for the Thai Citizens' Party.

The family dispute came to a head with Hangthong's controversial death in 1999. He was found dead from a gunshot wound to the head in the family mansion with a gun in his hand in the early hours of 6 September. It was widely questioned whether the death was a suicide or a disguised murder, and Hangthong's brother Noppadol became a prime suspect. Multiple forensic investigations requested by the family's different factions resulted in conflicting outcomes, and it was not until 2010 that Noppadol was acquitted by the Court of Appeals.

== Life and career ==
Hangthong Thammawattana was born to Arkom Chatchaianand and Suwapee Thammawattana, the second son out of ten siblings (including an elder half-brother and an adopted sister). He graduated in civil engineering from the University of Texas at Austin and earned a master's degree in structural engineering from the Asian Institute of Technology. He entered multiple marriages, and had sons Changwat and Tanthong Tumwattana.

Hangthong's mother Suwapee was matriarch of the Thammawattana family, who own and operate the Yingcharoen Market in the Saphan Mai area of Bangkok's Bang Khen District. The family fortune was the subject of a long-running inheritance feud which involved multiple assassinations, attempts and disappearances. Suwapee died in 1990, and her eldest son Therdchai (Hangthong's half-brother) was abducted and presumed murdered in 1991. Hangthong, the eldest surviving son, subsequently became head of the family.

Hangthong entered politics and was elected to the House of Representatives in 1995, representing Bangkok's twelfth district (at the time) for the Thai Citizens' Party; he was re-elected in 1996. By 1999, he had had arguments with his younger brother Noppadol Thammawattana, who accused Hangthong of appropriating family funds for his political career.

== Death ==
On 5 September 1999, Hangthong, Noppadol and sister Malika Leelapan had met with a legal adviser to discuss the handling of the family estate. Noppadol was probably the last person to see Hangthong alive at the family mansion in Bang Khen, where they lived. At around 03:00 on 6 September, Hangthong's body was found in an armchair in Noppadol's bedroom, with a gunshot wound to the head and a .38 revolver in his right hand.

The police initially ruled the case a suicide. Several of the other siblings, however, refused to accept this explanation, believing that Hangthong was murdered as a result of the familial dispute. Younger sister Narumol had Scottish forensics expert Adrian Linacre weigh in on the case, and secured a second autopsy by celebrity forensics pathologist Pornthip Rojanasunand, who was Deputy Director of the Institute of Forensic Science. Both reached conclusions that supported murder. Noppadol, however, also enlisted the opinion of the famous American forensics scientist Henry Lee, who supported the original suicide finding, and a third autopsy by the Forensic Association of Thailand also found that suicide could not be ruled out.

Noppadol was formally indicted on murder charges in January 2004. He was acquitted by the Criminal Court, which found Pornthip's testimony insufficient, in 2007. The ruling was upheld by the Court of Appeals in 2010. Noppadol also filed a complaint of ethical misconduct against Pornthip to the Medical Council of Thailand, which put her on probation for publicly commenting on the case. In 2014, the remaining members of the Thammawattana family finally settled 48 outstanding court cases they had filed against each other in the family dispute.

== See also ==
- List of unsolved deaths
