= Aswin Kwanmuang =

Thai politician

Police General Aswin Kwanmuang
- อัศวิน ขวัญเมือง
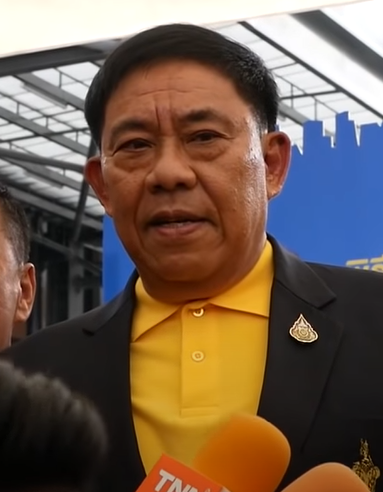
- Aswin in 2019

16th Governor of Bangkok
- In office 18 October 2016 – 24 March 2022
- Preceded by: Sukhumbhand Paribatra
- Succeeded by: Chadchart Sittipunt

Personal details
- Born: 15 February 1951 (age 75) U Thong, Suphan Buri, Thailand
- Party: Democrat (???–2016, 2026–)
- Other political affiliations: United Thai Nation (2023–2026)
- Spouse: Wasana Kwanmuang
- Education: Royal Thai Police Cadet Academy
- Profession: Politician

Aswin Kwanmuang (Thai: อัศวิน ขวัญเมือง, RTGS: Atsawin Khwanmueang; pronounced [ʔàt.sā.wīn kʰwǎn.mɯ̄aŋ]; born 15 February 1951) is a Thai politician and Former Deputy Commissioner of Royal Thai Police who served as the governor of Bangkok from October 2016 to March 2022. He was an independent candidate in the 2022 Bangkok gubernatorial election but was not elected.

== Personal life and education ==
He graduated from secondary level from Dan Chang Wittaya School and then start police careers at Provincial Police Region 7 School as a police NCO student and then he studied at Royal Thai Police Cadet Academy as an officer cadet class 30 receiving bacherlor degree in public administration (police affairs). Later, he attended Advanced Police Administration Program Class 16 and National Defense College class 45.

== Police careers ==
He was known as a skilled police officer who has worked on many important cases at the national level, such as the murder of Jo Danchang, the car bomb case of former Prime Minister Thaksin, the case of arresting of Kamnan Sia, Jip Phia Khiao and the extrajudicial case of Joke Phai Khiao.

In the middle of 2008, when having the rank of Police Lieutenant General, he was moved from the position of Commissioner of the Metropolitan Police Bureau, to be Assistant Commissioner of Police. Pol Lt Gen Suchart Muankaew taking this position instead was criticized because the police could not handle the rally of the People's Alliance for Democracy.

Later, in the government of Abhisit Vejjajiva in mid-2009, there was news that Suthep Thaugsuban Deputy Prime Minister overseeing internal security was trying to pledge to be an Advisor Level 10 of Royal Thai Police in the rank of Police General, which was a newly opened position. But the Police Commission did not provide approval. Later, in October of the same year, he was graciously accepted as a police general and set as Deputy Commissioner of Royal Thai Police; and later was appointed to serve as a replacement for Commissioner of Police Region 2 to take care of the eastern region. Then, moving from that position, to become Commissioner of Police Region 1 to supervising the central region in October 2010 which was at the end of the same year.

He also received the nickname from the media of the "Aswin Pid Job" (Thai: อัศวินปิดจ๊อบ, "Knight (his name "Aswin") closed the job") because of the fierce performance and "Phai Khiao buster" and also received votes from the ABAC poll that he was a police officer who is a "police buster" which people felt was the most liked and would solve crime.

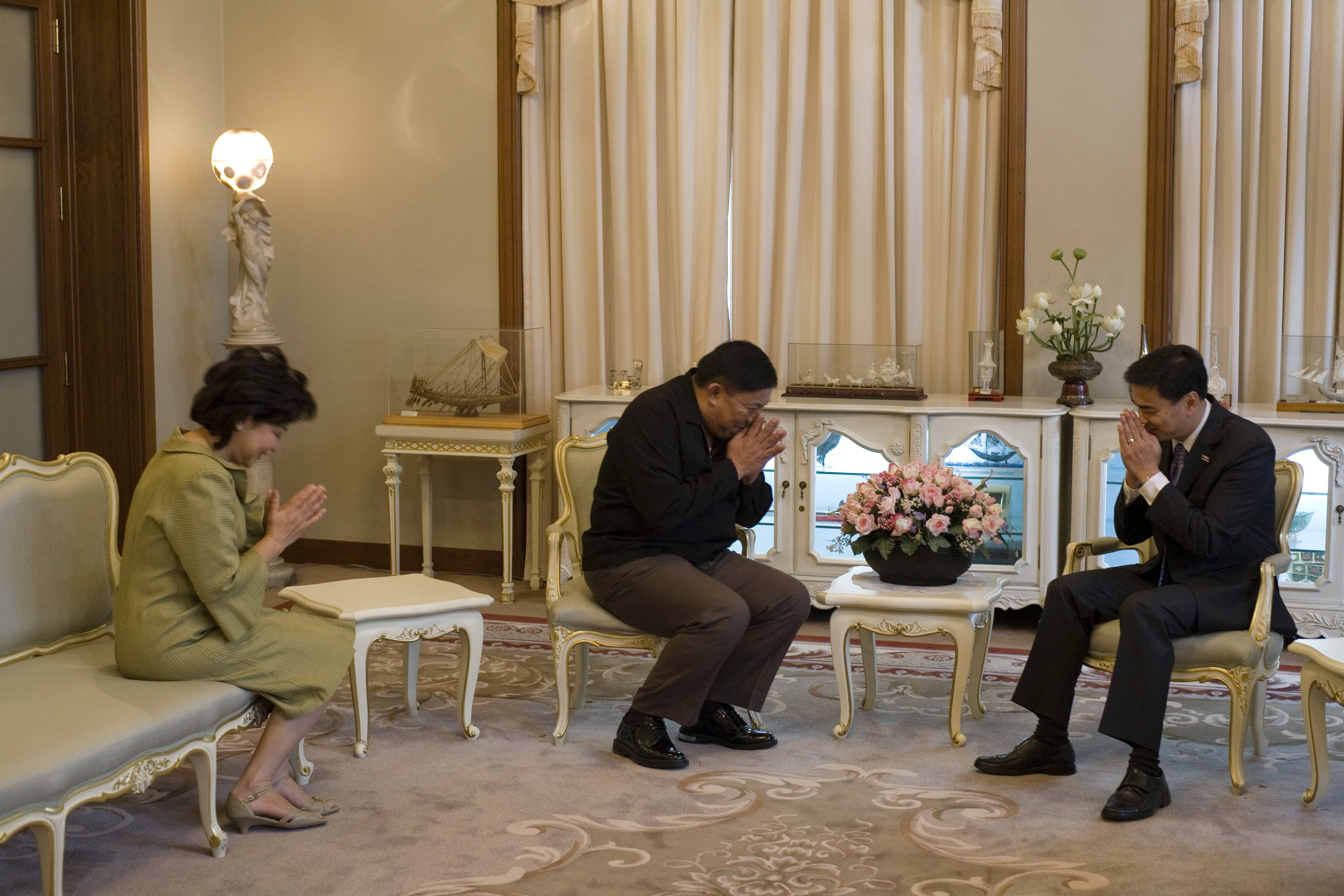
Aswin Kwanmuang with Prime Minister Abhisit Vejjajiva (right)

== Governor ==
After retiring from the police force, he was appointed as Deputy Governor of Bangkok by Governor Sukhumbhand Paribatra to oversee disaster prevention and mitigation work, as well as municipal affairs. He served in this position until being appointed by the National Council for Peace and Order to serve as Governor of Bangkok. He is the first Thai police officer in history to hold this position.

On 24 March 2022, Asawin Kwanmuang, Governor of Bangkok, announced his resignation after 5 years of working as Governor of Bangkok and was ready to run for 2022 Bangkok Gubernatorial Election as an independent candidate. After the election is over, Aswin lost the election to Chadchart Sittipunt., but he received up to 214,805 votes (8.10%) for the fifth place.

== Royal decorations ==
- 2010 – Knight Grand Cordon (Special Class) of the Most Exalted Order of the White Elephant.
- 2006 – Knight Grand Cordon (Special Class) of the Most Noble Order of the Crown of Thailand .
- 2017 – Companion in the Order of the Direkgunabhorn.
- 2022 – Bitaksa Seri Chon - Freemen Safeguarding Medal (Second Class, Second Category)
- 1985 – Chakra Mala Medal.

Political offices
Preceded by Sukhumbhand Paribatra	Governor of Bangkok; 2016–2022	Succeeded by Chadchart Sittipunt
