= Bangkok Metropolitan Council =

Legislative branch of the government of Bangkok, Thailand

Bangkok Metropolitan Council สภากรุงเทพมหานคร Sapha Krungthep Mahanakhon
- 14th Council
- Seal of the Bangkok Metropolitan Administration

Type
- Type: Legislature of the Bangkok Metropolitan Administration

Leadership
- Chair: Pattraporn Kengrungruengchai, People’s since 13 July 2026
- First Deputy Chair: Natipoom Mingrujiralai, Bangkok Possible Group since 13 July 2026
- Second Deputy Chair: Narisson Saengkaew, Independent since 13 July 2026

Structure
- Seats: 50
- Political groups: Majority (37): People’s (22); Bangkok Possible Group (11); Better Bangkok Group (2); Independent (2); Minority (13): Democrat (8); Pheu Thai Balanced Life Group (Note: Pheu Thai Party affiliates) (4); Pattana Nong Khaem Group (1)

Elections
- Voting system: First past the post
- Last election: 28 June 2026
- Next election: 2030

Meeting place
- Second Bangkok City Hall; Airawat Patthana Tower; Din Daeng, Bangkok

Website
- bmc.go.th

The Bangkok Metropolitan Council, or BMC (Thai: สภากรุงเทพมหานคร, romanized: Sapha Krungthep Mahanakhon (RTGS)) is the legislative branch of the Bangkok Metropolitan Administration, the government of Bangkok City. It is vested with legislative power and the duty to scrutinise the administration of the Bangkok Metropolitan Administration with the Governor of Bangkok as head of the executive.

== Structure ==
The Council consists of Bangkok Metropolitan Councillors (Thai: สมาชิกสภากรุงเทพมหานคร, romanized: Samachik Sapha Krungthep Mahanakhon), who are elected directly by voters in each of Bangkok's 50 districts. In recent elections, a district may return more than one councillor, therefore the number of councillors composing the BMC often fluctuates between elections. The number of councillors to be elected per district is prescribed by the Election Commission, in accordance with the registered population in each district.

The council has a fixed term of 4 years, and elections are often out of sync with gubernatorial elections. The most recent elections took place on 26 June 2026.

The current (13th) Bangkok Metropolitan Council consists of 50 councillors.

=== Committees ===
The council is divided into 11 general committees with five to nine members appointed by the councillors themselves:

1. Committee of Cleanliness and Environment
2. Committee for Checking the Minutes of Sittings and for Considering Closure of the Minutes of the Secret Sittings
3. Committee for the Affairs of the Bangkok Metropolitan Council
4. Committee for the Public Works and Utilities
5. Committee for Education and Culture
6. Committee for Health
7. Committee for Community Development and Social Welfare
8. Committee for Local Administration and Orderliness
9. Committee for Economics, Finance, and Follow-up of Budget Utilization
10. Committee for Tourism and Sports
11. Committee for Traffic, Transportation, and Drainage

=== Secretariat of the council ===
The Secretariat of the Bangkok Metropolitan Council (Thai: สำนักงานเลขานุการสภากรุงเทพมหานคร) is the executive agency of the council. The secretariat helps the council in all its roles including drafting of legislation, organisation of sessions, minutes and procedures of the council. The secretariat also helps members of the council by providing research and legal counsel. The secretariat is headed by the Secretary of the Bangkok Metropolitan Council (Thai: เลขานุการสภากรุงเทพมหานคร) The current secretary is Manit Tej-Apichok. The secretariat itself is divided into nine sections:

1. General Administration Section
2. Council and Committee Meetings Section
3. Working Committees Section
4. Legislation Section
5. Legal Section
6. Foreign Affairs Section
7. Council Service Section
8. Academic Section
9. Secretary Section

== Composition ==
District	Member	Party	Notes	Map
Bang Rak	Viput Srivaurai	Pheu Thai	Chairman	
Lad Krabang	Surachit Phongsinghvithya	Pheu Thai		
Bueng Kum	Natipoom Ming-rujiralai	Pheu Thai	First Deputy Chair	
Bang Na	Chatchai Mordee	People's	Second Deputy Chair	
Khlong Sam Wa	Narunanmon Huangsap			
Bangkok Noi	Napapon Jeenakul			
Min Buri	Wirat Meenchainunt			
Don Mueang	Kanoknuch Klinsung	Pheu Thai		

== History ==
Historical composition of the Council
No.	No. of council members	Term	Notes
1	46	1973–1975	Appointed
2	41	1975–1977	
3	45	1977–1984	Appointed
4	40	1984–1985	Appointed
5	46	1985–1989	
6	57	1990–1994	
7	54	1994–1998	
8	60	1998–2002	
9	61	2002–2006	
10	57	2006–2010	
11	61	2010–2014	
12	30	2014–2022	Appointed
13	50	2022–2026	
14	50	2026–	

The Bangkok Metropolitan Council was established under Declaration No. 335 of the Revolutionary Committee, issued on 13 December 1972. The first Council consisted of 46 members as shown in the table above.
