= Don Mueang district =

Don Mueang ดอนเมือง
- Khet
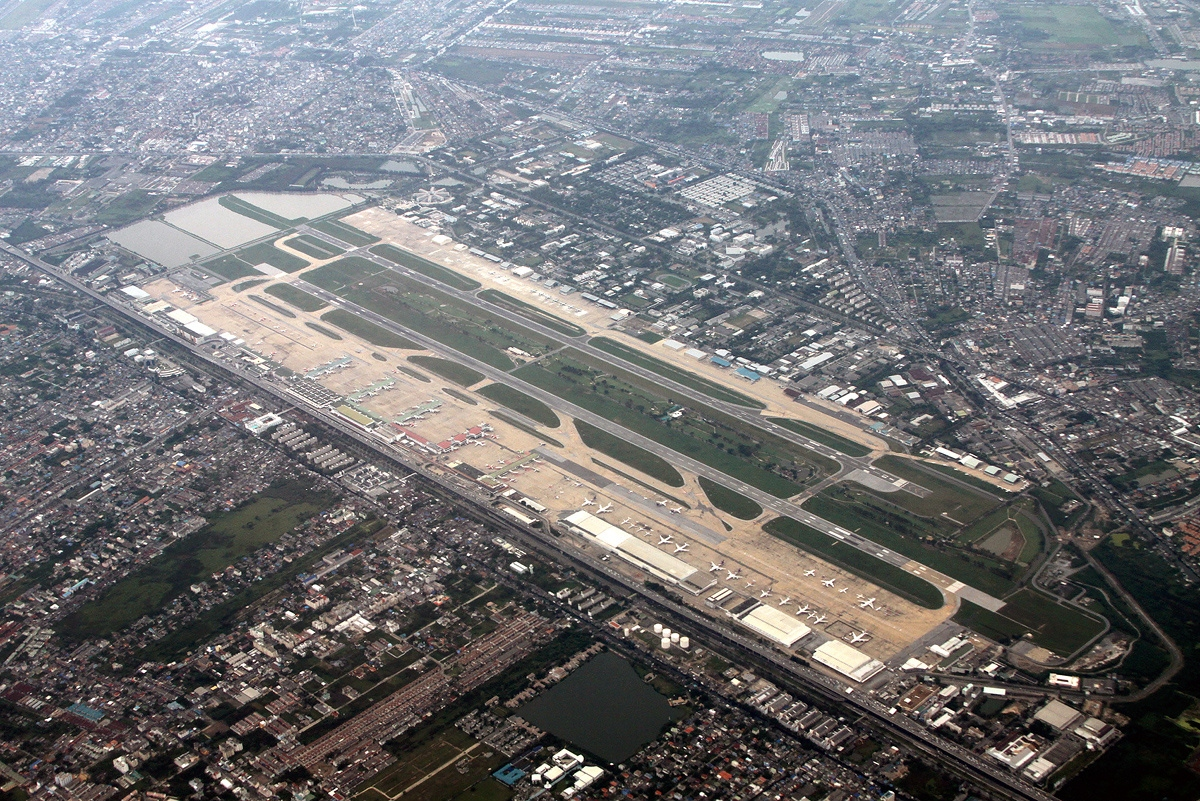
- Aerial view of Don Mueang International Airport

- Khet location in Bangkok
- Coordinates: 13°54′49″N 100°35′23″E
- Country: Thailand
- Province: Bangkok
- Seat: Don Mueang
- Khwaeng: 3
- Khet established: 4 September 1989

Area
  - Total: 36.803 km^{2} (14.210 sq mi)

Population (2017)
  - Total: 168,973
  - Density: 4,591.28/km^{2} (11,891.4/sq mi)
- Time zone: UTC+7 (ICT)
- Postal code: 10210
- Geocode: 1036

Don Mueang (Thai: ดอนเมือง, RTGS: Don Mueang, pronounced [dɔ̄ːn mɯ̄a̯ŋ]; lit. 'the upland where the town is located'; sometimes spelled "Don Muang") is one of the 50 districts (khet) of Bangkok, Thailand. It is bounded by (from north clockwise): Mueang Pathum Thani and Lam Luk Ka of Pathum Thani province; Sai Mai, Bang Khen and Lak Si of Bangkok; and Pak Kret of Nonthaburi province. The district is best known as the location of Don Mueang International Airport.

== History ==
Don Mueang was once part of Bang Khen, but it became a district in its own right in 1989. Later in 1997, the southern part of Don Mueang was split off to establish a new district, Lak Si.

Don Mueang was originally called "Don I Yiao" ("the upland of hawks") because of its elevated terrain. The area did not flood and was rich in wildlife, especially birds of prey including hawks, hence the name. At that time, only about 50 households lived in the area, concentrated around what is now the northern end of Don Mueang International Airport; the only way to access the area was by railway. The new name, Don Mueang, was given by King Vajiravudh (Rama VI) when a Royal Thai Air Force base was established there. As both the air force base and later the airport took shape, prosperity gradually came to Don Mueang.

== Places ==
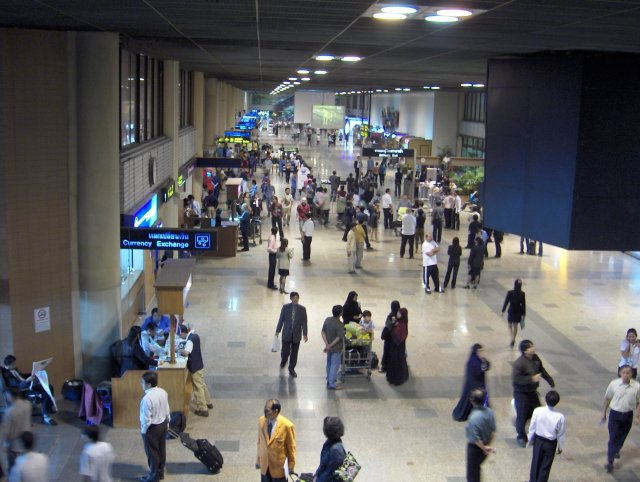
Arrival hall, Don Mueang International Airport

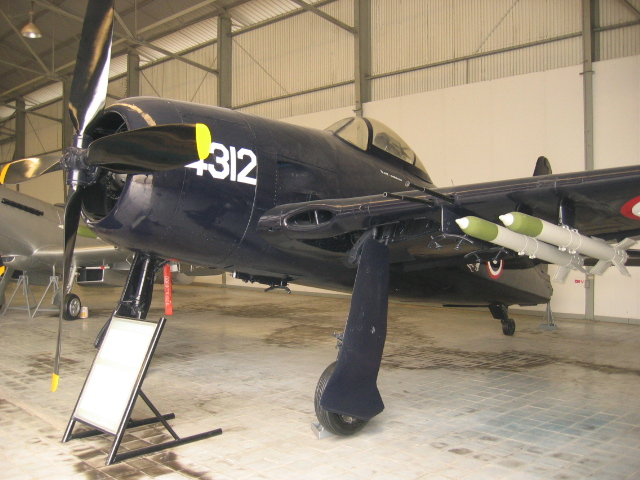
Grumman F8F Bearcat, Royal Thai Air Force Museum

- Don Mueang International Airport
- Don Muang Royal Thai Air Force Base
- Royal Thai Air Force Museum

== Administration ==
The district is divided into three sub-districts (khwaeng).

No.	Name	Thai	Area (km^{2})	Map
2.	Si Kan	สีกัน	11.534	Map
4.	Don Mueang	ดอนเมือง	10.605	Map
5.	Sanambin	สนามบิน	14.664	Map
Total			36.803	Map

The missing numbers 1 and 3 belong to the sub-districts which were split off to form Lak Si district.

== Politics ==
Don Mueang has been a stronghold for the Pheu Thai Party (and its predecessors, Thai Rak Thai Party and People's Power Party), winning in every general and gubernatorial elections after the 2006 coup and is considered a "deep red" district. The last time the Democrats had an MP in the constituency was in 1976. However in late 2012, Kanoknuch Naksuwanpha, a Democrat and a long-time local politician, won an upset election to secure her seat on the city council. It is believed that the reason she won was because of her long ties with Don Mueang as she built her political base in the area for decades.

Later in the mid-2013, Tankhun Jitt-itsara, a Democrat candidate, defeated Yuranunt Pamornmontri, a Pheu Thai candidate, in the Don Mueang by-election to replace the former MP Karun Hosakul, who had been disqualified by the Election Commission of Thailand (ECT). It was the Democrat Party's first victory in the district in almost 40 years.

=== MPs ===
- 1995–96: Paveena Hongsakul, Hangthong Thammawattana, Sumit Sundaravej
- 1996–2000: Paveena Hongsakul, Hangthong Thammawattana, Sumit Sundaravej
- 2001–05: M.R. Damrongdit Disakul
- 2005–06: Janista Lewchalermvongse
- 2007–11: Anusorn Punthong, Anudith Nakornthap, Karun Hosakul
- 2011–14: Surachat Thianthong (11th)
- 2011–13: Karun Hosakul (12th)
- 2013–14: Tankhun Jitt-itsara (12th)
- Vacant due to 2014 Thai coup d'état
- 2019–23: Karun Hosakul (10th)
- 2023–present: Ekkarach Udomumnuay

=== Electoral district ===
- 2007 – Bangkok 5th district
- 2011 – Bangkok 11th district (Sanam Bin), Bangkok 12th district (Don Mueang, Si Kan)
- 2019 – Bangkok 10th district
- 2023 – Bangkok 10th district

=== District Council ===
The district council for Don Mueang had eight members who serve four-year terms. 2006 Thailand local elections were last held on 30 April 2006. The results were:

- Chart Thai Party: seven seats
- Thai Rak Thai Party: one seat

In the 2026 Bangkok Metropolitan Council election, which was held concurrently with the Bangkok gubernatorial election, Kanoknuch Klinsung, a former Bangkok Metropolitan Council (MC) member from the Pheu Thai Party, narrowly lost to Adisorn Ruksalaksanee of the People's Party by just 22 votes. Following the result, she called on the Election Commission of Thailand to conduct a recount.

== Climate ==
Climate data for Don Mueang District (Don Mueang International Airport) (1991–2020 normals)
Month	Jan	Feb	Mar	Apr	May	Jun	Jul	Aug	Sep	Oct	Nov	Dec	Year
Mean daily maximum °C (°F)	32.1 (89.8)	33.6 (92.5)	34.9 (94.8)	35.8 (96.4)	35.0 (95.0)	34.1 (93.4)	33.5 (92.3)	33.3 (91.9)	33.1 (91.6)	32.6 (90.7)	32.3 (90.1)	31.6 (88.9)	33.5 (92.3)
Daily mean °C (°F)	27.2 (81.0)	28.5 (83.3)	29.8 (85.6)	30.6 (87.1)	30.2 (86.4)	29.7 (85.5)	29.3 (84.7)	29.1 (84.4)	28.6 (83.5)	28.4 (83.1)	28.2 (82.8)	27.0 (80.6)	28.9 (84.0)
Mean daily minimum °C (°F)	22.9 (73.2)	24.1 (75.4)	25.8 (78.4)	26.7 (80.1)	26.7 (80.1)	26.5 (79.7)	26.3 (79.3)	26.1 (79.0)	25.6 (78.1)	25.4 (77.7)	24.5 (76.1)	22.9 (73.2)	25.3 (77.5)
Average precipitation mm (inches)	15.8 (0.62)	11.5 (0.45)	50.1 (1.97)	91.7 (3.61)	213.8 (8.42)	190.7 (7.51)	180.0 (7.09)	183.4 (7.22)	300.0 (11.81)	192.4 (7.57)	33.3 (1.31)	11.6 (0.46)	1,474.3 (58.04)
Average precipitation days (≥ 1.0 mm)	1.3	1.1	3.3	6.1	12.4	12.5	12.9	14.1	16.7	11.9	3.1	0.9	96.3
Average relative humidity (%)	66.4	68.0	70.0	71.0	73.2	73.9	74.3	75.4	78.7	77.4	69.4	64.5	71.9
Source: World Meteorological Organization

== Economy ==
The economy is dominated by the presence of Don Mueang International Airport. Airports of Thailand has its head office at Don Mueang. Thai Lion Air also has its head office in the district. The head offices of R Airlines and Solar Air are on the property of Don Mueang Airport.

== Education ==
Harrow International School, Bangkok is in the district.
