= Thewet Naruemit Bridge =

Bridge in Bangkok, Thailand

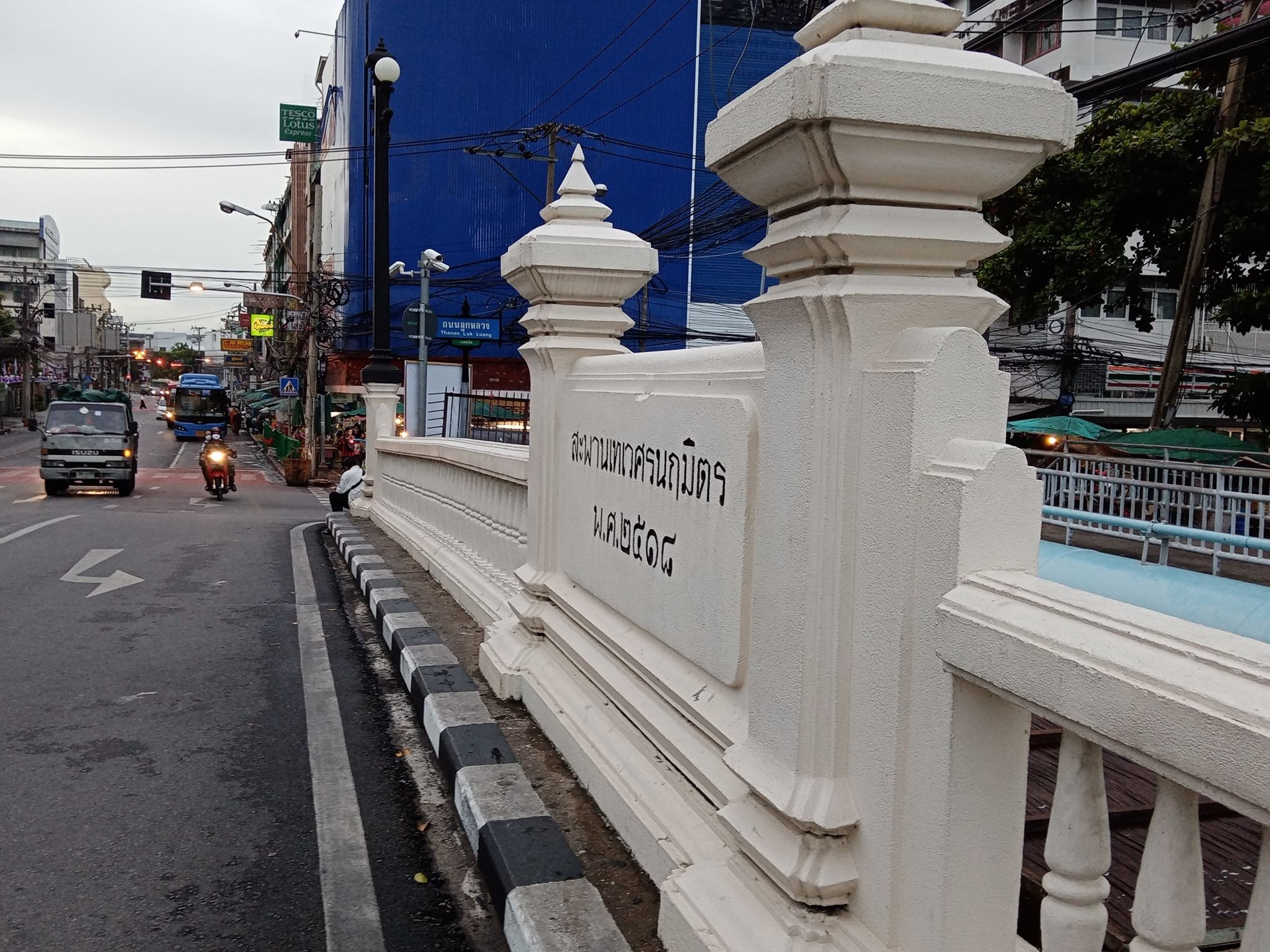
- Coordinates: 13°46′10.56″N 100°30′13.32″E
- Carries: Samsen Road
- Crosses: Khlong Phadung Krung Kasem
- Locale: Bangkok
- Official name: Thewet Naruemit Bridge
- Other name: Thewet
- Maintained by: Bangkok Metropolitan Administration (BMA)

History
- Opened: 1899

Location
- Interactive map of Thewet Naruemit Bridge

Thewet Naruemit Bridge is a historic bridge spanning Khlong Phadung Krung Kasem in Bangkok, Thailand. Its name also refers to the surrounding area known as Thewet. The bridge connects four subdistricts in two administrative districts of Bangkok: Wat Sam Phraya and Bang Khun Phrom in Phra Nakhon District, and Wachiraphayaban and Dusit in Dusit District.

== History ==
King Chulalongkorn (Rama V) ordered the Department of Public Works to construct the bridge. The King named it "Thewet Naruemit Bridge". "Thewet" means "great deity" and refers to "The Bridge Built by Hindu's Lord Shiva". When completed King Chulalongkorn gave the opening ceremony on June 30, 1899. It is the first bridge to cross Khlong Phadung Krung Kasem during his reign.

The bridge was restored in 1975. It was restored again along with Tha Chang Pier by the Ministry of Transport scheduled for completion May 2021.

== Surroundings ==
Thewet Market, otherwise known as Thewarat Market, is one of Bangkok's big and busy markets around the bridge. It is very famous, especially as a source of ornamental plants. The market is also well known for selling fish released for merit-making. In the past, it used to be the largest market in the suburbs. Before major wholesale vegetable markets such as Talat Thai and Si Mum Mueang Market were established, some vendors would sail from Suphan Buri to trade here.

In November 2023, the Bangkok Metropolitan Administration (BMA) reorganized the vendors' stalls in the market, bringing more order and tidiness to the area. The previously chaotic and congested atmosphere, with goods sprawling onto the walkways, has now been significantly improved.

Thewet is also the terminal of many bus lines including (3-5) 23, 3-4E, 33, (2-9) 53, (4-35) 72, (2-25) 516.

Thewet Pier (N15) is a station for Chao Phraya Express Boat that runs from Asiatique: The Riverfront to Nonthaburi province north of Bangkok.
