= Samsen Road =

Road and neighbourhood in Bangkok, Thailand

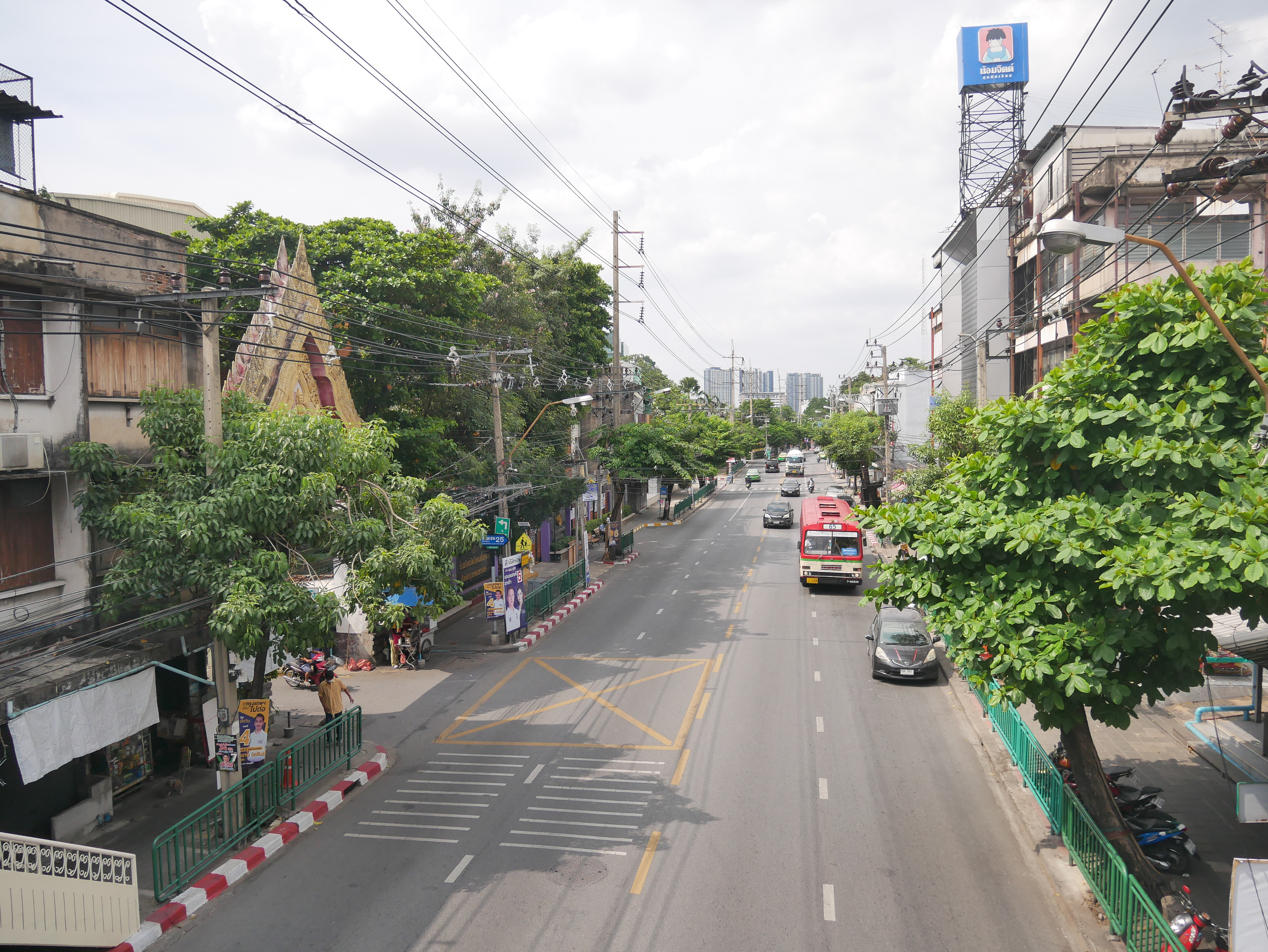
- Samsen Road at Bang Krabue
- Interactive map of Samsen Road
- Native name: ถนนสามเสน
- Former name: Saphan Kaew Road
- Namesake: Khlong Samsen
- Length: 4.6 km (2.9 mi)
- Location: Bangkok, Thailand
- Coordinates: 13°47′00″N 100°30′44″E
- South end: Phra Sumen Road and Chakrabongse Road, Phra Nakhon
- North end: Pracharat Sai 1 Road and Thahan Road, Dusit

Samsen or spelled Sam Sen (Thai: สามเสน, pronounced [sǎːm.sěːn]) is a road and neighbourhood in Bangkok considered to be one of Bangkok's oldest. Samsen Road starts from Bang Lamphu Intersection in the area of Bang Lamphu within Phra Nakhon district and wends northeast to Dusit district as far as it ends at Kiakkai Intersection, covering 4.6 km (2.9 mi). It runs parallel to east Chao Phraya river all the route.

== History ==
Samsen began during the Ayutthaya period (1351–1767), particularly in the reign of King Narai (1633–1688). The Portuguese came to live and work in the kingdom, and the king allowed them to settle in Samsen. At that time, this area was mainly paddy fields and canals, including Khlong Samsen (Samsen canal), which is believed to be a natural canal. The Portuguese founded the Immaculate Conception Church around 1674, which is the oldest church in Thailand.

During the reigns of King Phutthayotfa Chulalok (Rama I) and King Nangklao (Rama III) of the Rattanakosin Kingdom, Christian Khmer and Annamese (Vietnamese) refugees fleeing crackdowns in their countries migrated to Siam (now Thailand). They were allowed by the king to settle near the Portuguese church in Samsen. The area became known as "Ban Khmer" (บ้านเขมร) and "Ban Yuan" (บ้านญวน).

Samsen has at least two Thai temples dating back to the Ayutthaya period or earlier: Wat Rachathiwat and Wat Thewarat Kunchorn.

In the past, the area from Samsen to Pak Kret in Nonthaburi was known as a spawning ground for toli shad (Tenualosa toli). These fish would swim from the sea to spawn in the freshwater stretches of the Chao Phraya river, from the Bangkok area northwards. As a result, they were once heavily fished, which has led to their endangered status today.

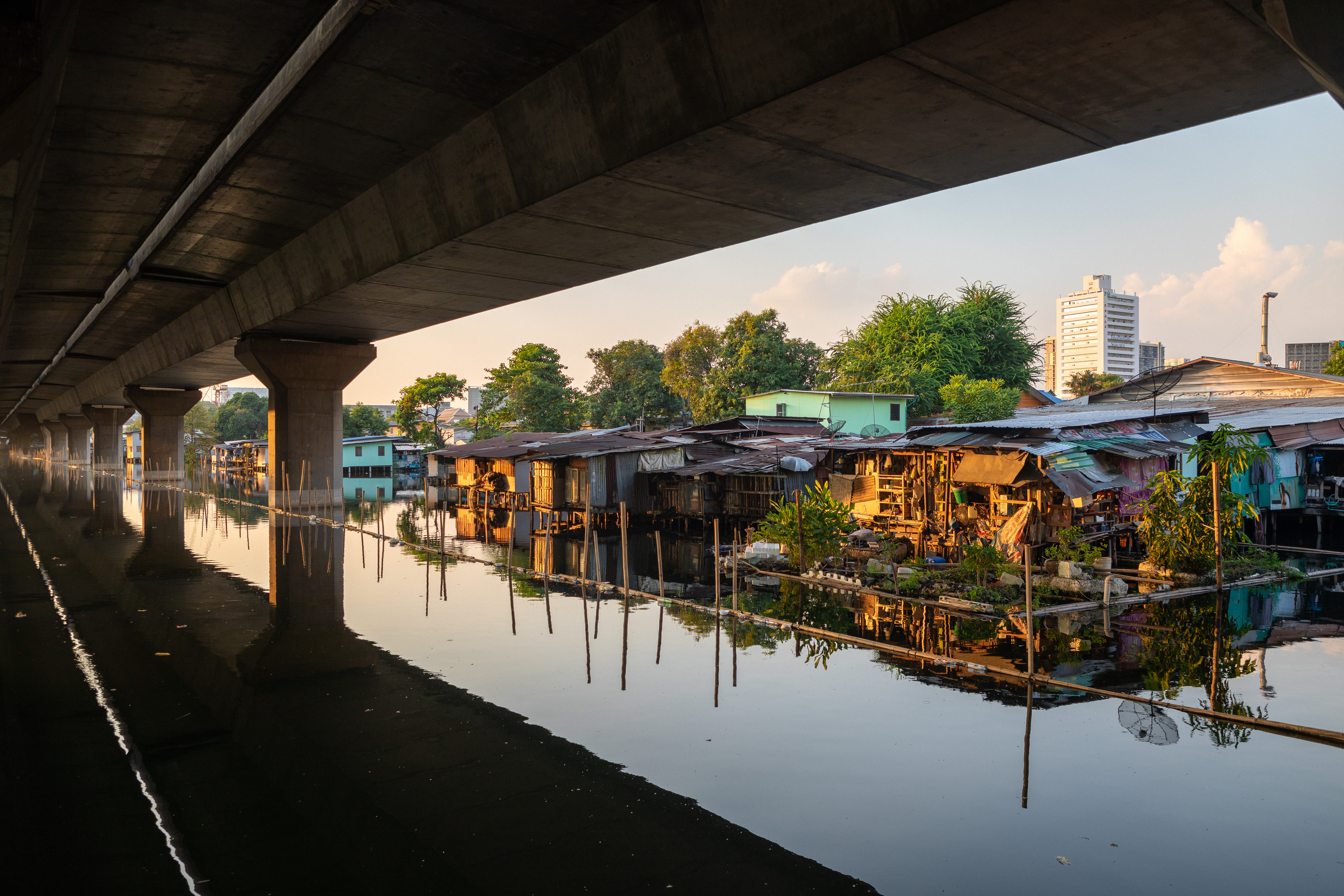
Community along Khlong Samsen, near the Si Rat Expressway

=== 2025 collapse ===
On September 24, 2025, at 7:13 a.m., a section of Samsen Road subsided in front of Vajira Hospital, creating a sinkhole measuring 30 m (98.4 ft) wide, 30 m (98.4 ft) long, and 50 m (164.0 ft) deep. The collapse expanded to the area in front of the Samsen Metropolitan Police Station. Two electricity poles and three vehicles fell into the hole. As a result, traffic was closed on Samsen Road from Wachira Intersection (where it meets Sukhothai Road) to Sanghi Intersection (where it meets Ratchawithi Road). Patients were evacuated from Vajira Hospital, as well as residents living in nearby apartments.

Bangkok Governor Chadchart Sittipunt stated that the road collapse was caused by soil and water leakage into the tunnel area under construction for the MRT Purple Line extension (Tao Poon–Rat Burana section), possibly due to heavy rainfall.

Prime Minister and Interior Minister Anutin Charnvirakul announced that the matter would be brought up for discussion at the special session of the 65th cabinet meeting, to be held the same day after the swearing-in ceremony and official assumption of duties. He further noted that repairing the tunnel at the incident site would take approximately one year.

== Toponymy ==
"Samsen" has no specific meaning in Thai. It may have derived from Pali or from Bahasa Melayu. Legendarily a floating Buddha statue required up to three hundred thousand people to raise it from the water. "Samsen" is similar to "Sam Saen", which means three hundred thousand. This Buddha statue, known as Luang Por Phuttha Samsen or simply Luang Por Samsen, is depicted in the rain-stopping posture and is enshrined in front of the Samsen Metropolitan Police Station today.

Two related sub-districts are Samsen Nai in Phaya Thai and Samsen Nok in Huai Khwang districts. They are connected to Khlong Samsen rather than the road.

== Route ==
Samsen Road was built during the reign of King Chulalongkorn (Rama V) and is considered the first road connecting the inner city with the northern suburbs. It was originally informally known as "Saphan Kaew Road" (ถนนสะพานแก้ว, [tʰānǒn sā.pʰāːn kɛ̂ːw]).

Although it is short, Samsen Road runs through historic and important places such as Bang Khun Phrom Palace and Bank of Thailand with Devavesm Palace, Thewet Bridge, Immaculate Conception Church, Saint Francis Xavier Church, Saint Gabriel's College, Vajira Hospital, Suan Sunandha Rajabhat University, Sukhothai Palace, National Library and Royal Pier, Thavasuki, Wat Bot Samsen, Boon Rawd Brewery Headquarters and Sappaya-Sapasathan, the new Parliament House.

The road also a location of five piers for Chao Phraya Express Boat: Thewet (N15), Payap (N18), Irrigation Dept. (N19), Kheaw Khai Ka (N20), and Kiak Kai (N21).

At the intersection with Ratchawithi Road (Sanghi Intersection), near Krungthon Bridge (Sang Hi Bridge) on Ratchawithi Road, stands San Chao Mae Thapthim Samsen, a Chinese shrine dedicated to Shui Wei Sheng Niang, the sea goddess worshiped by the Hainanese since ancient times, similar to Mazu. It is considered her oldest shrine in Bangkok, believed to have been built during the reign of King Nangklao.

Samsen Road is also the administrative boundary line in the following khwaengs (sub-districts):

- Chana Songkhram (outbound) and Talat Yot (inbound) in Phra Nakhon district from Bang Lamphu Intersection to Norarat Sathan Bridge
- Wat Sam Phraya (outbound) and Ban Phan Thom (inbound) in Phra Nakhon district from the Nararat Sathan Bridge to Bang Khun Phrom Intersection
- Wat Sam Phraya (outbound) and Bang Khun Phrom (inbound) in Phra Nakhon district, from Bang Khun Phrom Intersection to Thewet Naruemit Bridge
- Wachiraphayaban (outbound) and Dusit (inbound) in Dusit district, from the Thewet Naruemit to Sophon Bridges
