= Bang Khun Phrom =

Bang Khun Phrom บางขุนพรหม
- Khwaeng
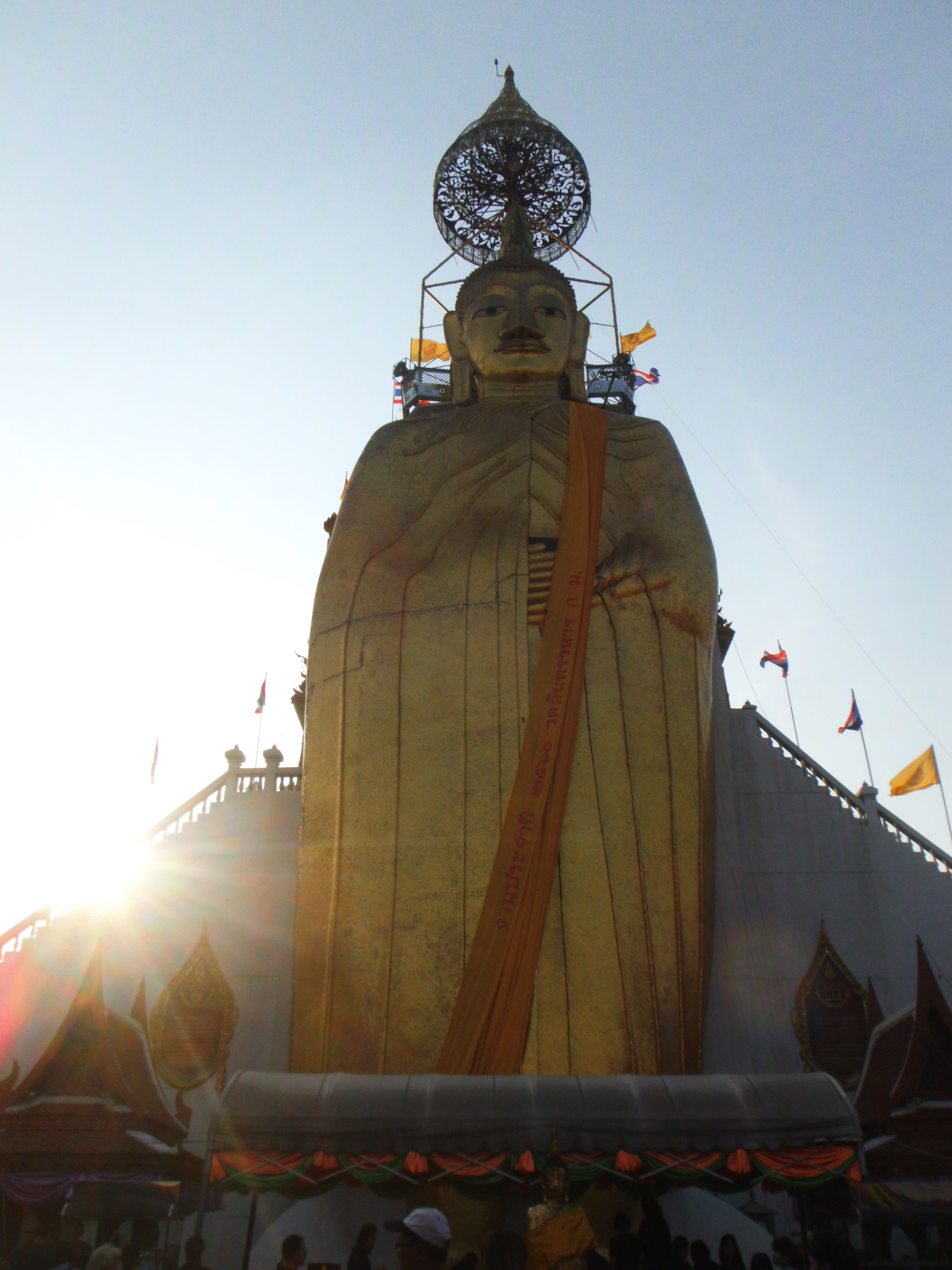
- Luang Pho To, a huge standing Buddha image of Wat Intharawihan, Bang Khun Phrom

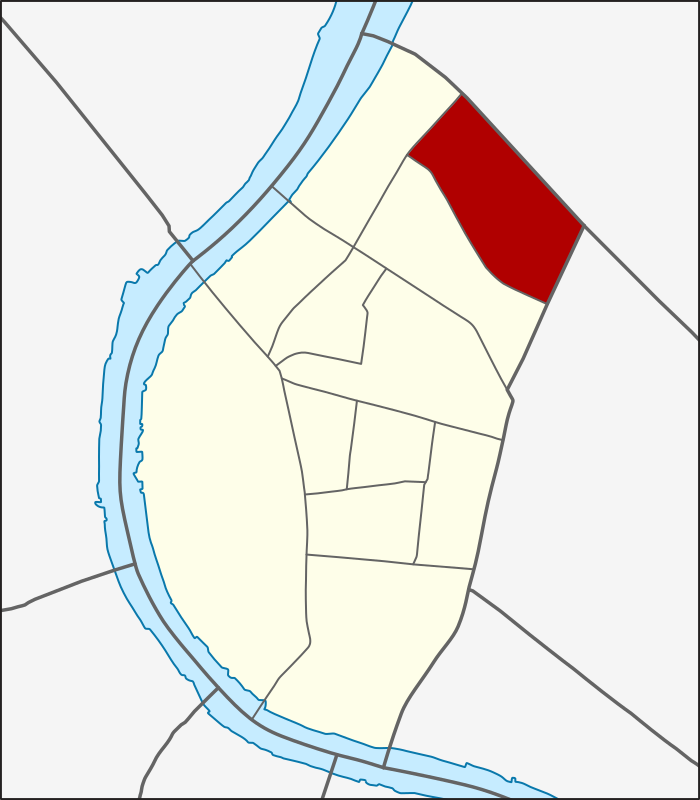
- Location in Phra Nakhon District
- Country: Thailand
- Province: Bangkok
- Khet: Phra Nakhon

Area
  - Total: 0.458 km^{2} (0.177 sq mi)

Population (2020)
  - Total: 4,063
- Time zone: UTC+7 (ICT)
- Postal code: 10200
- TIS 1099: 100111

Bang Khun Phrom (Thai: บางขุนพรหม, pronounced [bāːŋ kʰǔn pʰrōm]) is a khwaeng (subdistrict) of Phra Nakhon District, in Bangkok, Thailand. In 2020, it had a total population of 4,063 people.

== History & toponymy ==
Formerly the area known as Ban Lan (บ้านลาน, pronounced [bâːn lāːn]), a place that was a hub of palm-leaf manuscript shops. The name Ban Lan literally means "community of palm-leaves". The palm leaves sold at Bang Khun Phrom were imported from Pak Kret's Bang Tanai.

Later, its name was changed to Bang Khun Phrom after the name of Khun Phrom, a nobleman who had a monopoly on the palm-leaf trade in this area.

In the past, Bang Khun Phrom area was as wide as the western side of Samsen Road, the location of Wat Sam Phraya and Bang Khun Phrom Palace. The result of the administrative division of Bangkok causing both to be in the present Wat Sam Phraya Subdistrict.

Bang Khun Phrom, in the perception of Thai people, is known in terms of being the location of the country's first television station, Channel 4 (present-day Channel 9 MCOT HD), which has been in operation since 1955, therefore it is familiarly known as Channel 4 Bang Khun Phrom.

Originally, the area beside Wat Sam Phraya cut across Samsen Road to Wat Iam Woranuch and Wat Mai Amataros. There was Khlong Bang Khun Phrom running through it. It was a large and wide canal. Khlong Bang Khun Phrom was filled during the government of Field Marshal Thanom Kittikachorn as a road named Payap Road. Today it has been integrated into a part of Samsen Road.

== Prominent landmarks ==
Bang Khun Phrom houses several important international and Thai landmarks and buildings. Some of these include:

- The headquarters of the United Nations Economic and Social Commission for Asia and the Pacific (ESCAP), including the UN Conference Centre (UNCC).
- The headquarters of the Royal Thai Army.
- Wat Intharawihan, a 15th century temple noted for its 32-metre-high statue of Buddha.
- The Makut Kasatriyaram Ratchaworawihan Temple (Wat Makut), which was built for King Mongkut in the 1800s.
- The Thewet Market.
- Offices of the UN Resident Coordinator for Thailand, the UN Development Programme (UNDP), UN Population Fund (UNFPA), UN Women and other agencies situated at the ESCAP headquarters premises.
