= Wat Sam Phraya subdistrict =

Wat Sam Phraya วัดสามพระยา
- Khwaeng
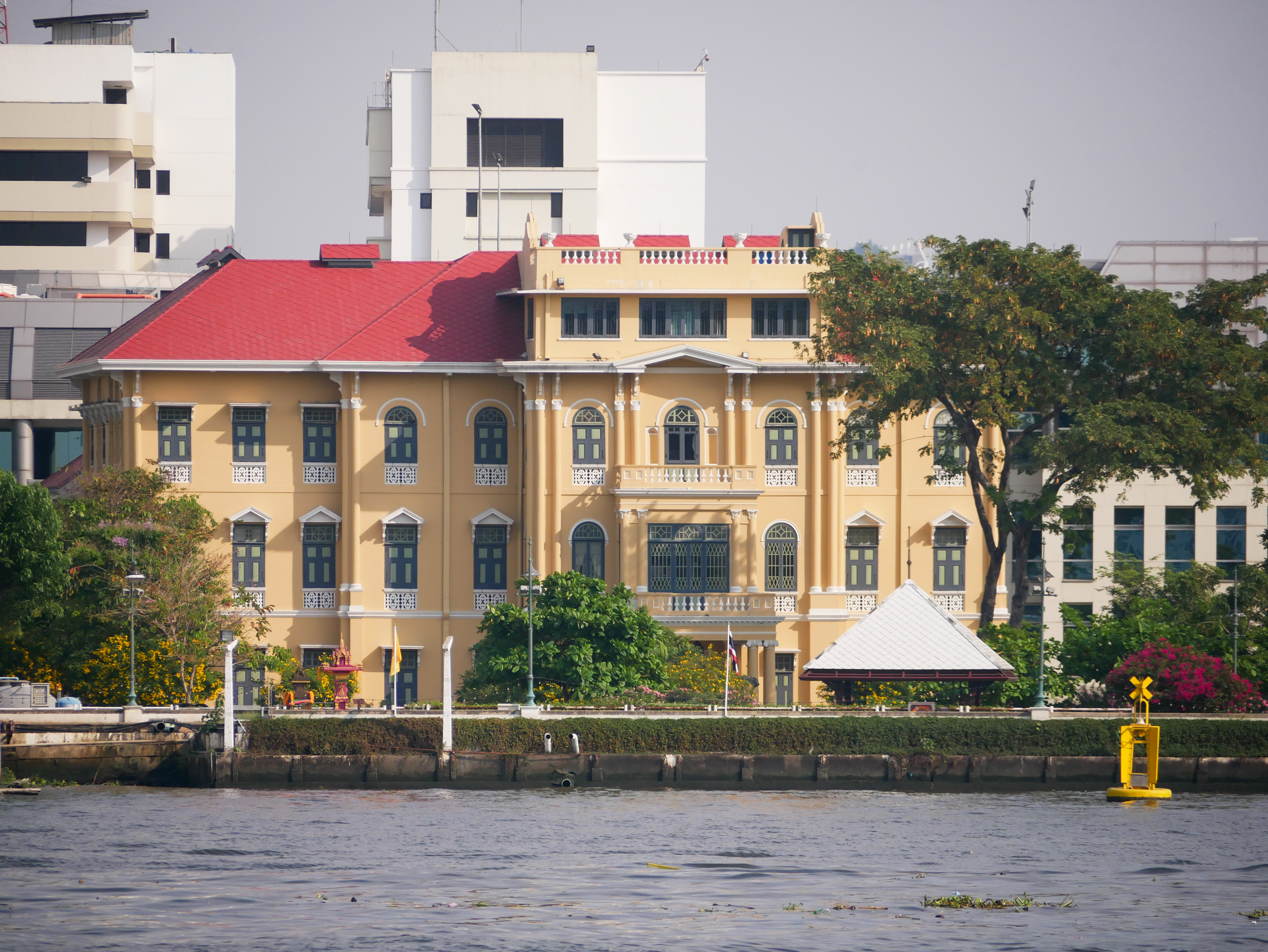
- Devavesm Palace part of the area of Bank of Thailand (BOT) alongside Bang Khun Phrom Palace

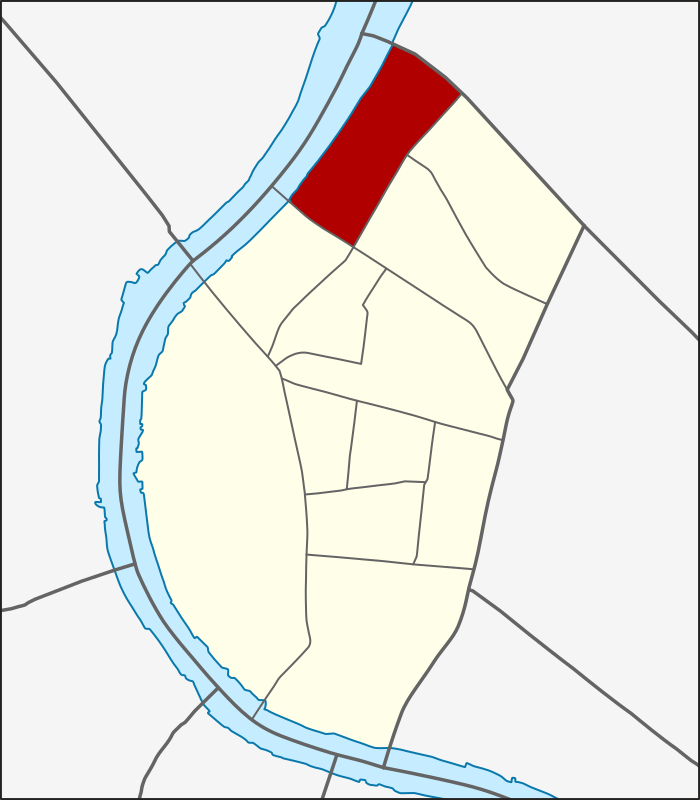
- Location in Phra Nakhon district
- Country: Thailand
- Province: Bangkok
- Khet: Phra Nakhon

Area
  - Total: 0.522 km^{2} (0.202 sq mi)

Population (2021)
  - Total: 2,663
  - Density: 5,101.53/km^{2} (13,212.9/sq mi)
- Time zone: UTC+7 (ICT)
- Postal code: 10200
- TIS 1099: 100112

Wat Sam Phraya (Thai: วัดสามพระยา, pronounced [wát sǎːm pʰrā.jāː]) is a khwaeng (subdistrict) in Phra Nakhon District, Bangkok.

== History ==
Wat Sam Phraya is an area outside Rattanakosin Island or Bangkok's old town zone. Considered to be the northern end of Bang Lamphu. It is named after the local temple Wat Sam Phraya and it is the location of the district office. "Bang Khun Phrom" is another unofficial name for it collectively with the subdistrict adjacent to Bang Khun Phrom. For Thai people, the area is familiar as the location of Channel 4, the country's first television station that has been operating since 1955 and is currently Channel 9 MCOT HD. Channel 4 was therefore often referred to as "Channel 4 Bang Khun Phrom".

== Geography ==
Wat Sam Phraya is the part on the northwestmost of the district. It is bounded by other subdistricts (from north clockwise): Wachiraphayaban in Dusit District (Khlong Phadung Krung Kasem is the dividing line), Bang Khun Phrom and Ban Phan Thom in its district (Samsen Road is the dividing line), Chana Songkhram in its district (Khlong Rop Krung is the dividing line), and Bang Yi Khan in Bang Phlat District (across the Chao Phraya River).

== Places ==
- Wat Sam Phraya
- Wat Sangwet
- Wat Noranarthsoontarikaram
- Thewet Pier (N15)
- Bank of Thailand (BOT) and Bang Khun Phrom with Devavesm Palaces
- Phra Nakhon District Office
- Cooperative Promotion Department (CPD)
- Rama VIII Bridge (share with nearby subdistricts)
