= Chana Songkhram =

Chana Songkhram may refer to:

- Wat Chana Songkhram, a Buddhist temple in Bangkok
- Chana Songkhram Subdistrict, named after the temple
- Wat Chana Songkhram (Sukhothai), a historical temple in Sukhothai Historical Park
