= Wat Sam Phraya =

Buddhist temple in Bangkok, Thailand

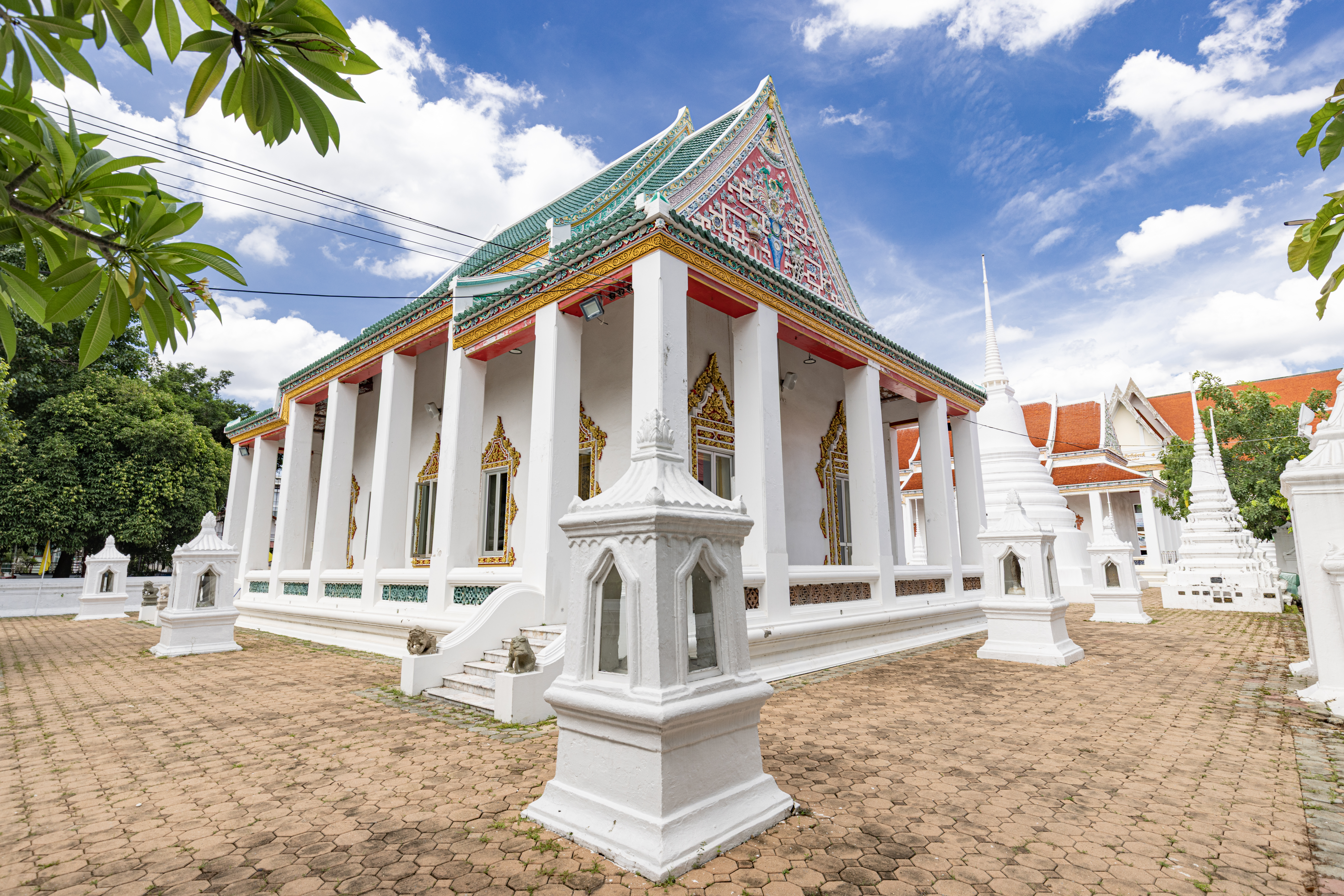
- ubosot

- Location within Bangkok

Religion
- Affiliation: Theravada Buddhism

Location
- Country: Thailand
- Interactive map of Wat Sam Phraya
- Coordinates: 13°45′56″N 100°29′58″E

Wat Sam Phraya (Thai: วัดสามพระยา) is a Thai royal temple of the third class, located in Wat Sam Phraya subdistrict, Phra Nakhon district, Bangkok. Formerly called Wat Sak or Wat Bang Khun Phrom, it was presumably built in the Ayutthaya period. It was restored and given its present name in the Bangkok era.

== History ==
During the reign of King Rama I (1782-1809 CE), Luang Wisut Yothamart (Troos) dedicated the land and houses of his deceased younger brother Khun Phrom (Sarat) as a temple in his memory, and it was named Bang Khun Phrom Temple. During the reign of King Rama III, the temple had fallen to ruins. Phraya Raja Supawadee (Khun Thong), Phraya Rachikul (Thong) and Phraya Thep Worachun (Thong Pak), who were the sons of Mrs. Phawa, the youngest sister of Luang Wisut Yothamat and Khun Phrom, jointly renovated the temple. When the three phraya offered the temple to King Rama III, he bestowed it the name "Sam Phraya Temple" (Temple of the Three Lords) and raised it to the status of a royal temple in the year 1823 CE (2366 BE).

== Structures ==
The ordination hall (ubosot in Thai) is a brick building with a double-tiered roof clad in Chinese glazed tiles. The main Buddha image of the temple is called Luang Pho Phra Phutta Keson. The interior walls are painted in a floral pattern. A frieze, depicting dragons and phoenix in gold, runs along the top of the walls. The sections between the windows depict offering tables in a Chinese style.

The ceremony hall is a brick building with 2-tiers of roof tiles, decorated with Chinese plates and patterns.

A total of twenty-five stupas lie within and around the enclosure of the ordination hall.

== Gallery ==
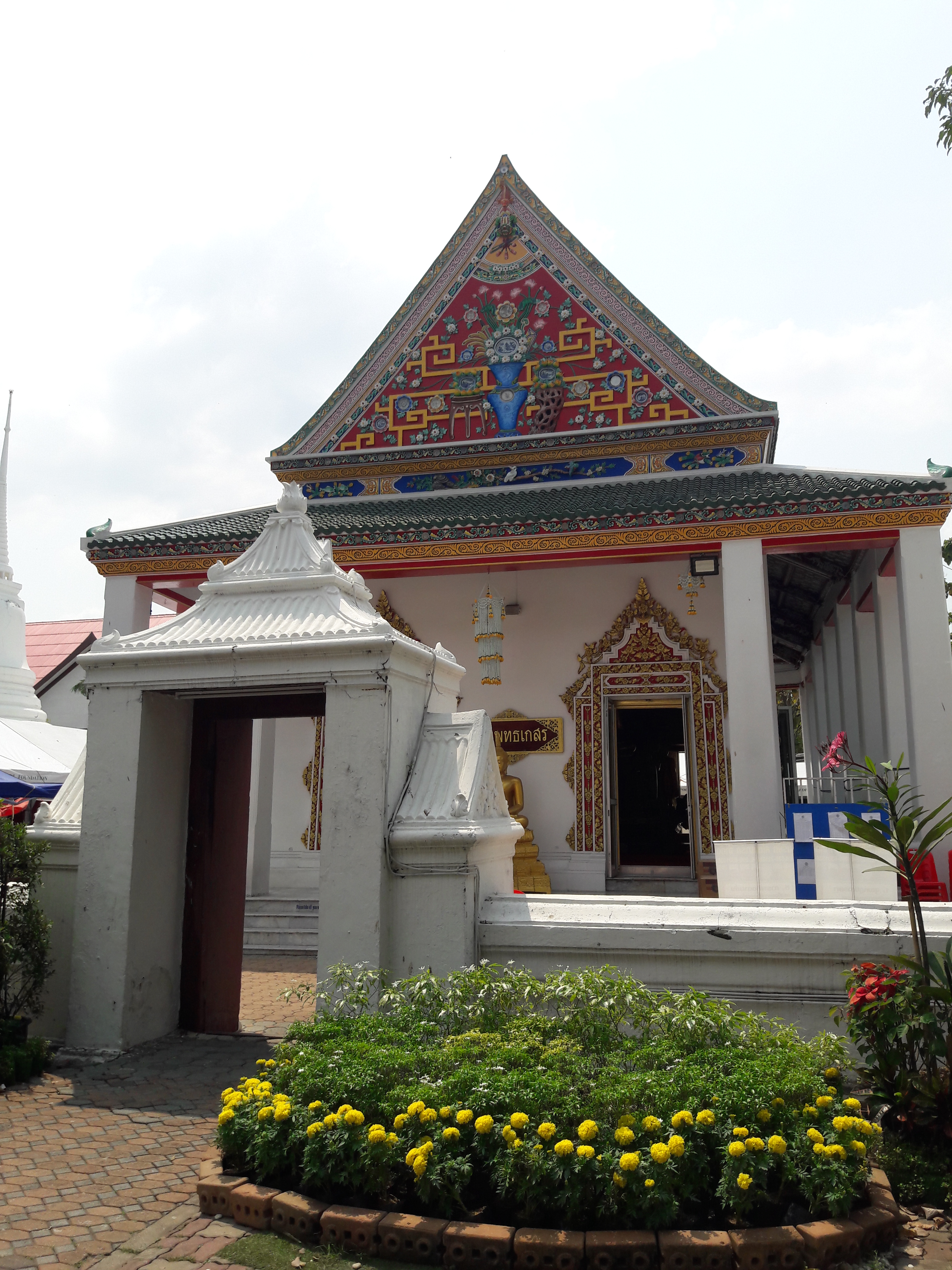
The ordination hall of Wat Sam Phraya

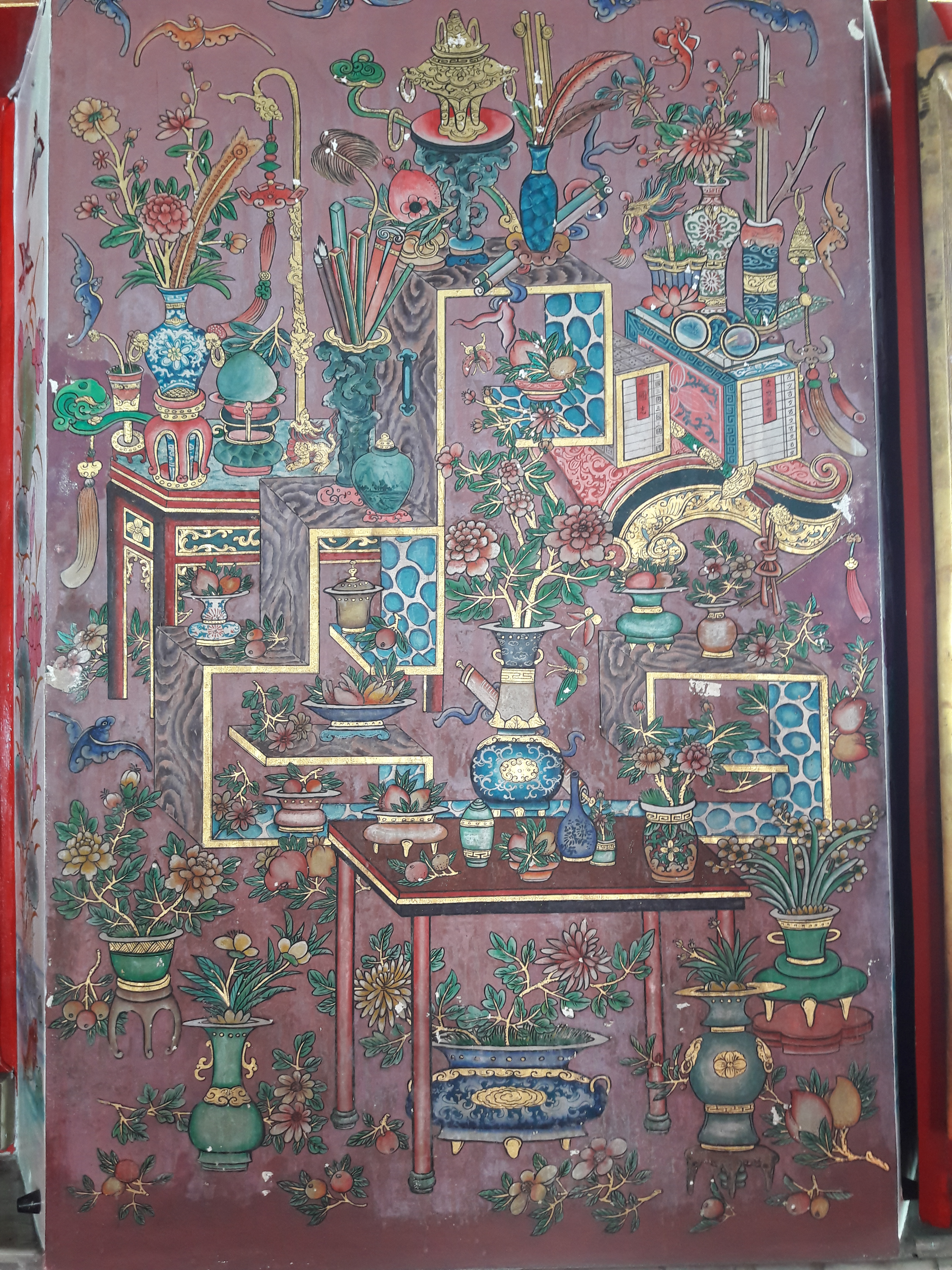
The sections of wall in between windows inside the ordination hall

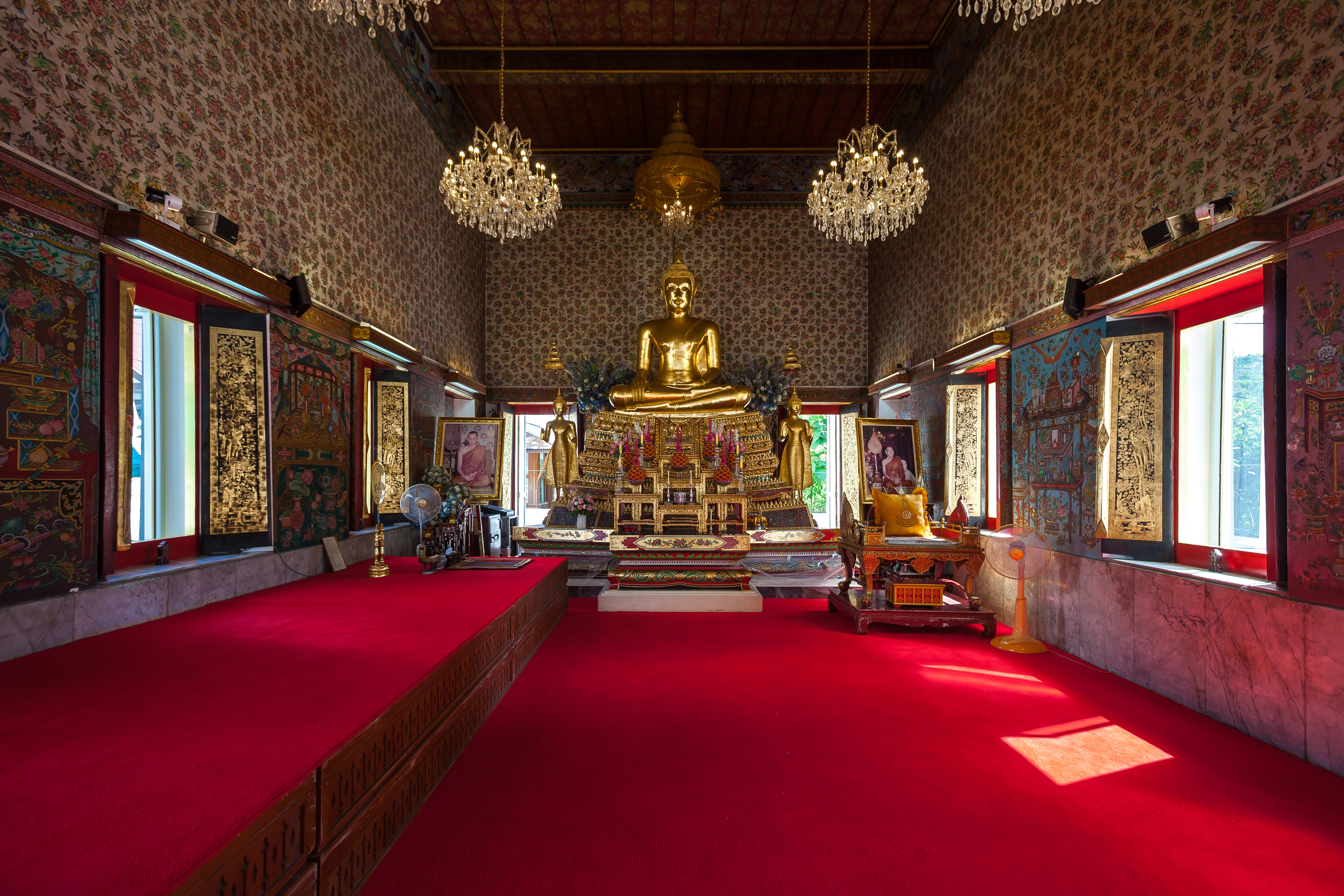
The interior of the ubosot

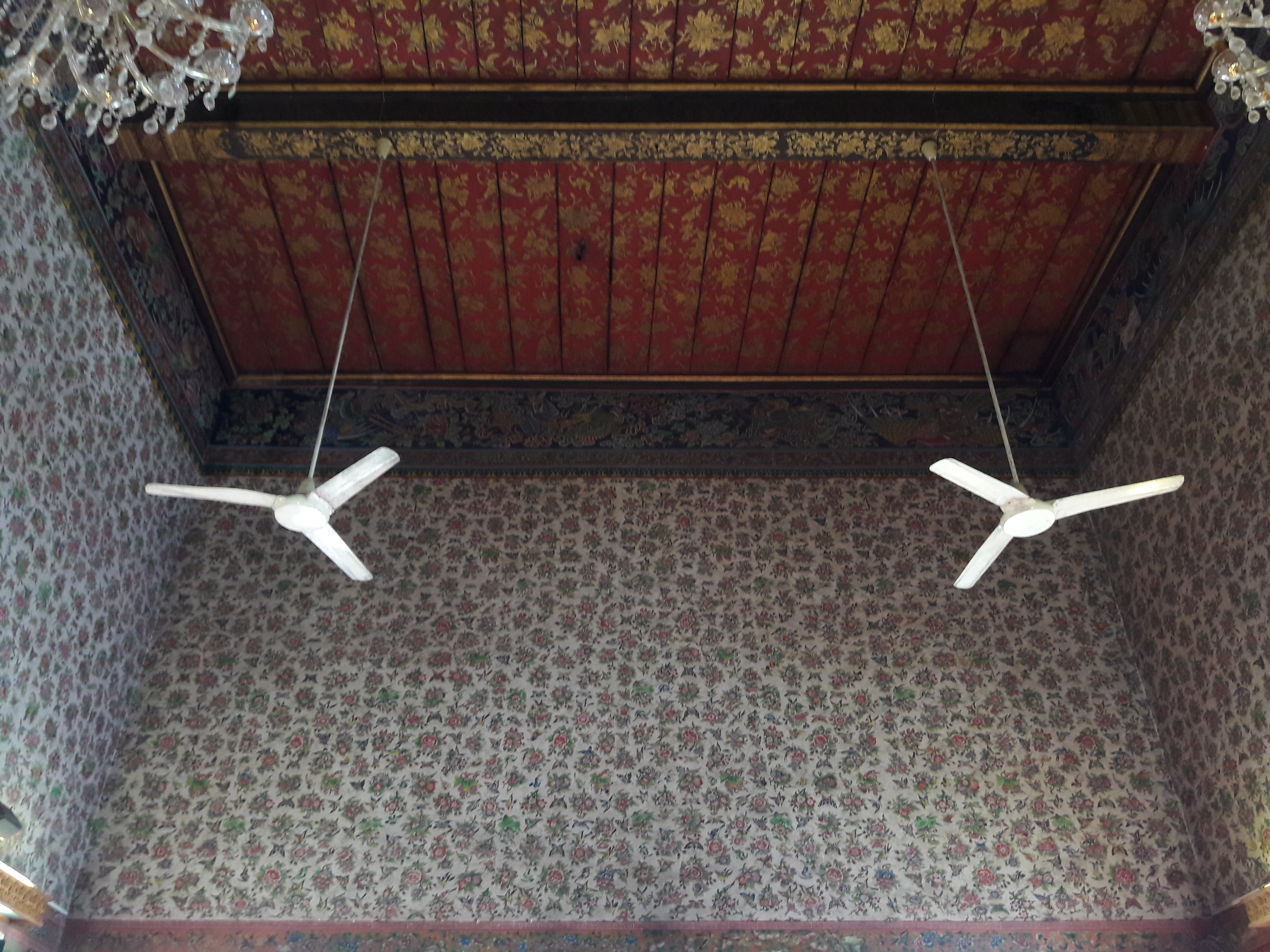
Showing the frieze and ceiling of the ordination hall

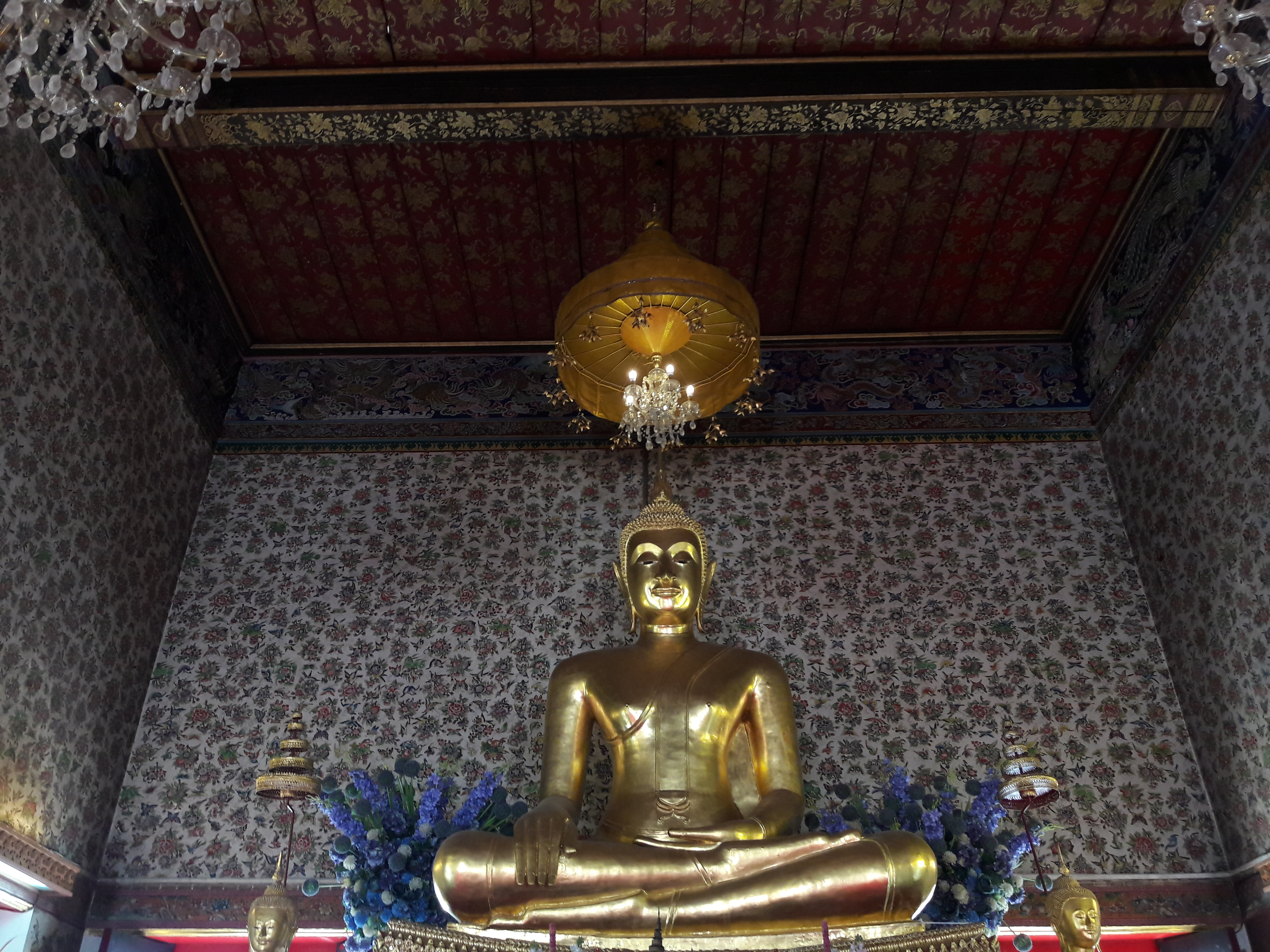
The main Buddha image in the temple

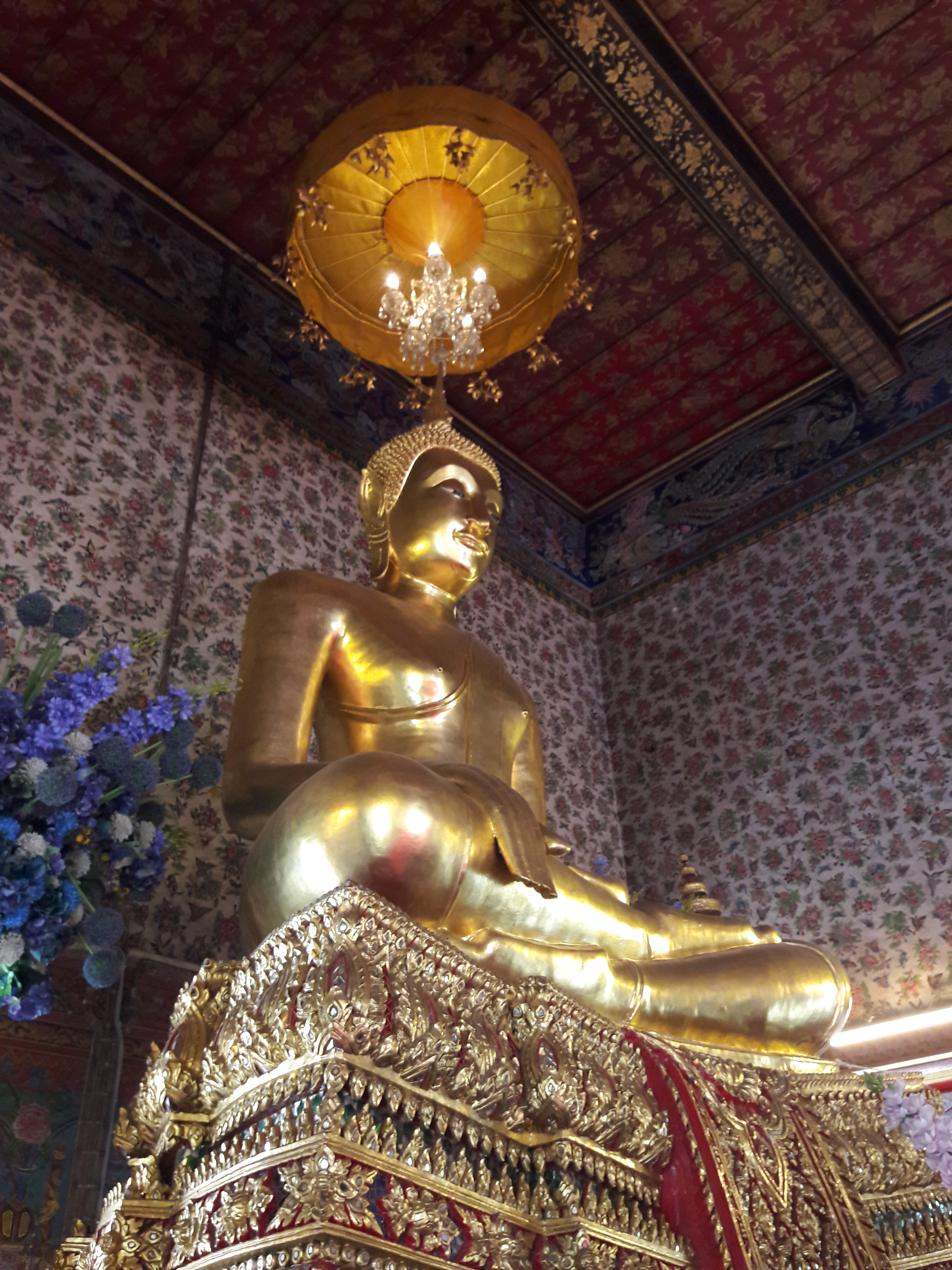
Luang Po Phra Phut Keson

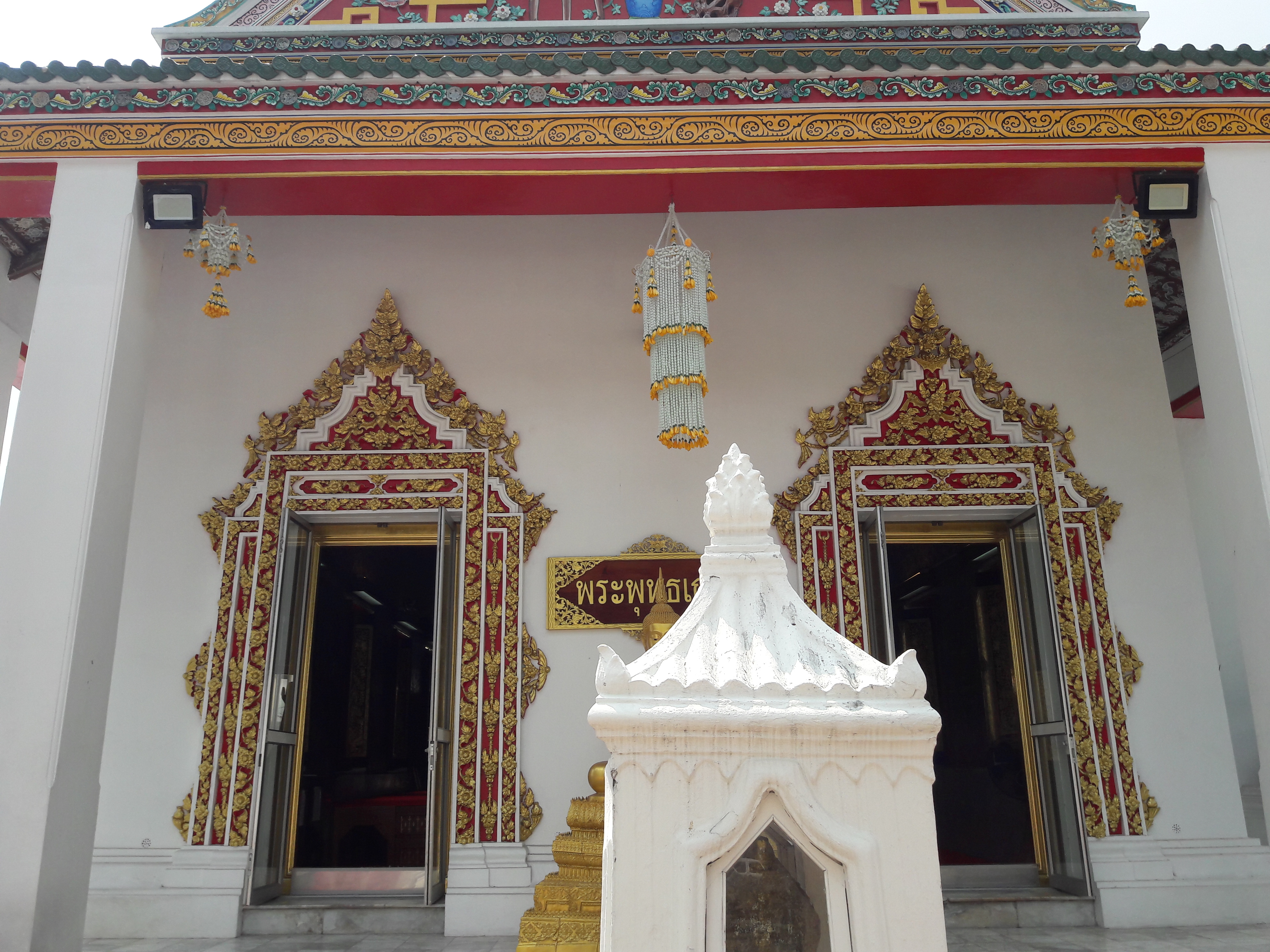
Decorations on the exterior of the ordination hall
