= Bank of Thailand Museum =

Museum in Bangkok, Thailand

Coordinates: 13°46′6″N 100°29′58″E

Bank of Thailand Museum is a museum in Bangkok. The museum is housed in the Bang Khun Phrom Palace, the former residence of Prince Paribatra Sukhumbandhu, who was the 33rd son of King Chulalongkorn. The Bank of Thailand, Northern Region also has a museum in Chiang Mai. In June 2017, the museum was reopened.

== Displays ==
The museum has 14 rooms, many of which display the history of Thai currency and the Bank of Thailand. The age range of the coins differs greatly and there are many ancient Thai coins found at excavation sites such as Funan coins (1st – 7th centuries), Sri Vijaya coins (8th – 13th centuries), Sukhothai period, (13th – 14th centuries), to the 14th – 19th centuries, from the Lanna Kingdom in the northern Thailand.

The museum displays banknotes dating back to the reign of King Rama IV in 1853 and documenting the late 1850s, when Queen Victoria of Great Britain gave Thailand the gift of a minting machine and the minting of Thai coins followed in 1858.

In the royal reception room, there are also portraits and photographs surrounded by lavish furnishing commemorating the visit by Elizabeth II and Prince Philip, Duke of Edinburgh, in 1996.

On 28 December 2006, Bang Khun Phrom Palace celebrated its centenary, which conducted traditional Thai performance in celebration.
