= Wat Rachathiwat =

Wat Rachathiwat Ratchaworawihan
- วัดราชาธิวาสราชวรวิหาร
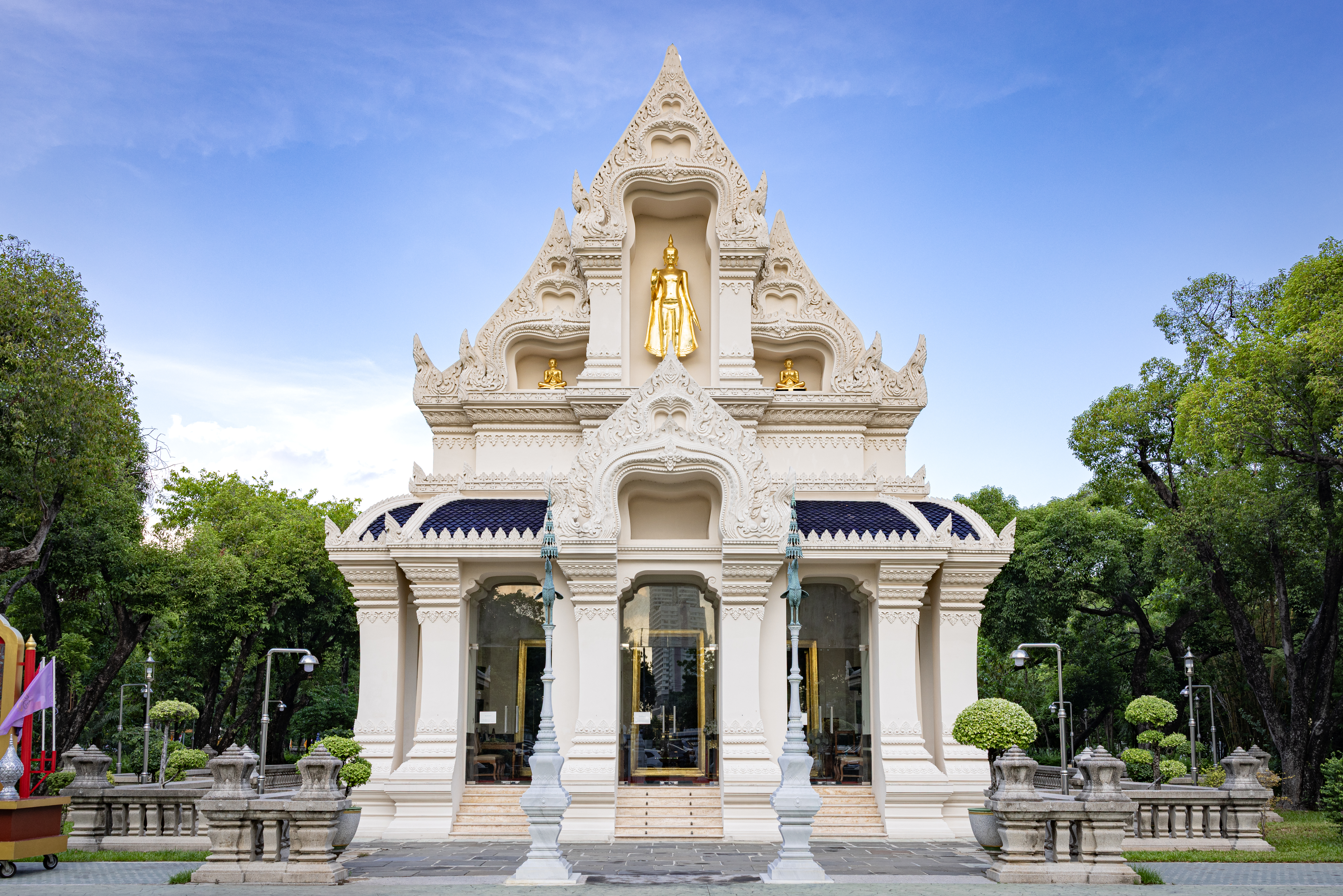
- Ubosot of Wat Rachathiwat Ratchaworawihan

Religion
- Affiliation: Buddhism
- Sect: Theravada (Dhammayuttika Nikaya)

Location
- Location: 3 Soi Wat Rajadhivas, Samsen Road, Wachira Phayaban Subdistrict, Dusit District, Bangkok 10300
- Country: Thailand
- Interactive map of Wat Rachathiwat Ratchaworawihan
- Coordinates: 13°46′24″N 100°30′25″E

Architecture
- Established: Ayutthaya period

Wat Rachathiwat Ratchaworawihan (วัดราชาธิวาสราชวรวิหาร) or simply Wat Rachathiwat, is a second-class royal monastery of the ratchaworawihan type, located on the east bank of the Chao Phraya River in the Wachiraphayaban subdistrict of Dusit, Bangkok. The monastery is linked with the Dhammayuttika Nikaya, a reform order of Thai Theravada Buddhism.

== History ==
The temple was established by Somdet Phra Bowonratchao Mahasurasinghanat from the former "Wat Samo Rai". It underwent continuous restoration from the reigns of King Rama I through King Rama III. Later, during the reign of King Rama IV, it was renovated once more and bestowed the new name "Wat Rachathiwat Wihan," which means "the temple that is the residence of the King". It is the first temple where the Dhammayuttika Nikaya monastic order originated.

The temple was badly damaged during World War II in 1945 and was even taken off the official list of buildings. It was rebuilt, and the main buildings, including the Ubosot (ordination hall), were finished in 1960.

== Administration ==
The current abbot is Phra Brahmavachiramonkol (พระพรหมวชิรมงคล; monastic name ลือชัย คุณวุฑฺโฒ).

== See also ==
- Dhammayuttika Nikaya
- Prince Narisara Nuwattiwong (designer associated with several Rattanakosin temples)
