= Bang Khun Phrom Palace =

Former royal residence in Bangkok

Coordinates: 13°46′07″N 100°29′58″E

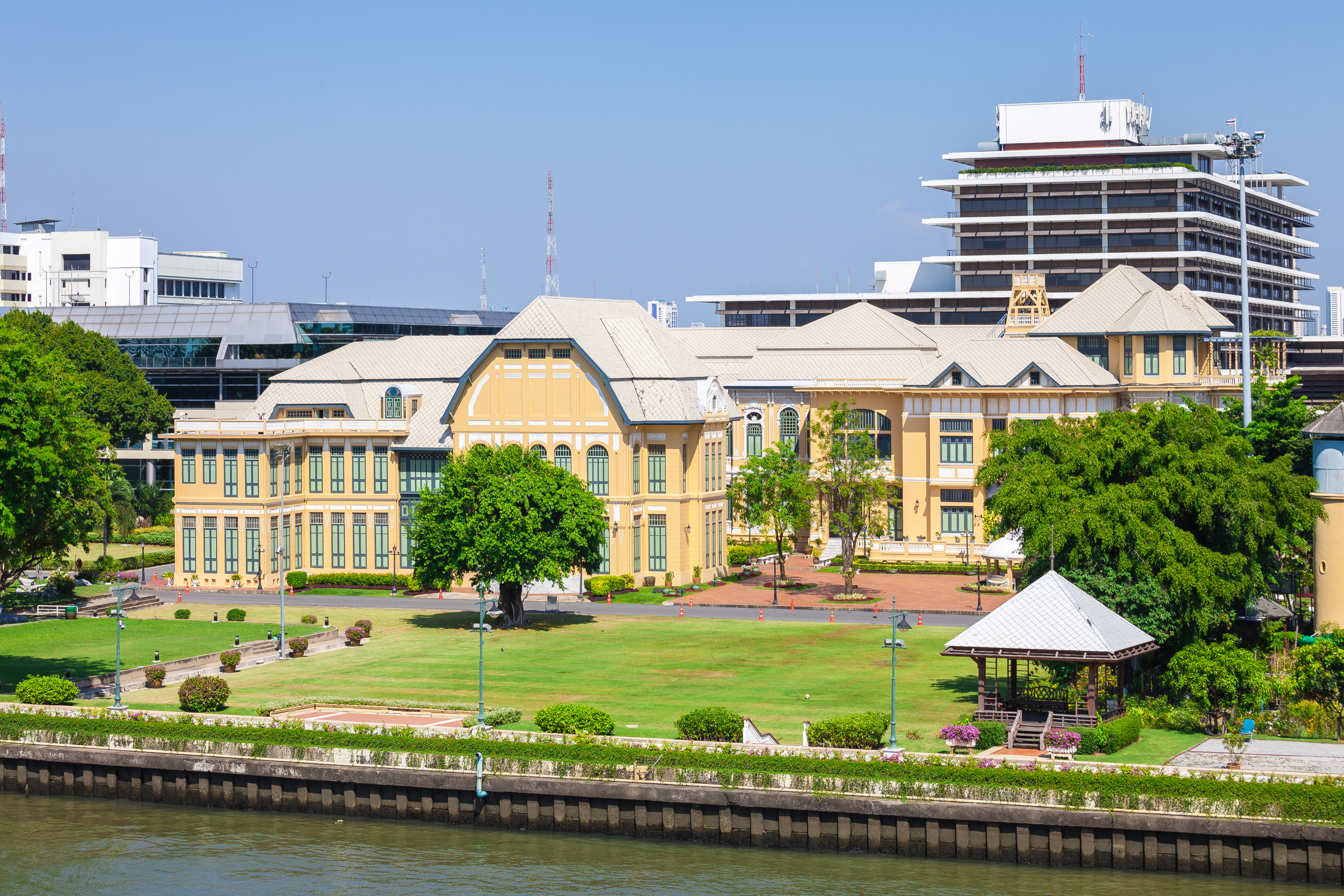
Bang Khun Phrom Palace, viewed from Rama VIII Bridge

The Bang Khun Phrom Palace (Thai: วังบางขุนพรหม) is a former royal residence in Bangkok, Thailand. It served as the residence of Prince Paribatra Sukhumbandhu until his forced exile following the Siamese revolution of 1932.

The palace is situated on the east bank of the Chao Phraya River, on Samsen Road in the Phra Nakhon District. It consists of two main buildings, the road-facing Tamnak Yai (main residence) and the river-facing Tamnak Somdet (residence of Queen Sukhumala Marasri, who was the Prince's mother). The main residence, designed by Mario Tamagno in neo-Baroque/Rococo style, was built in 1901 and 1902, while the Queen's residence was built around 1913 to designs by Karl Döhring in the Jugendstil or German Art Nouveau style.

Following the revolution, the palace served as the site of several government offices, until it became the headquarters of the Bank of Thailand in 1945. It is now a historic site, and housed the Bank of Thailand Museum until 2017, when its main exhibition was moved to the Bank of Thailand Learning Center in the former bank-note printing-press building. The palace is a registered ancient monument, and received the ASA Architectural Conservation Award in 1993.

In the Siamese revolution of 1932, Khana Ratsadon (people's party) seized the Royal Plaza and cut off all telecommunications after announcing its first manifesto. Some army forces invaded this site in order to control Prince Paribatra Sukhumbandhu, who served as the regent. At that time, he and his wife, along with a number of royal pages, were about to flee by boat from the pier behind the palace.
