= Wachiraphayaban subdistrict =

Coordinates: 13°46′50.0″N 100°30′13.6″E

Wachiraphayaban วชิรพยาบาล
- Khwaeng
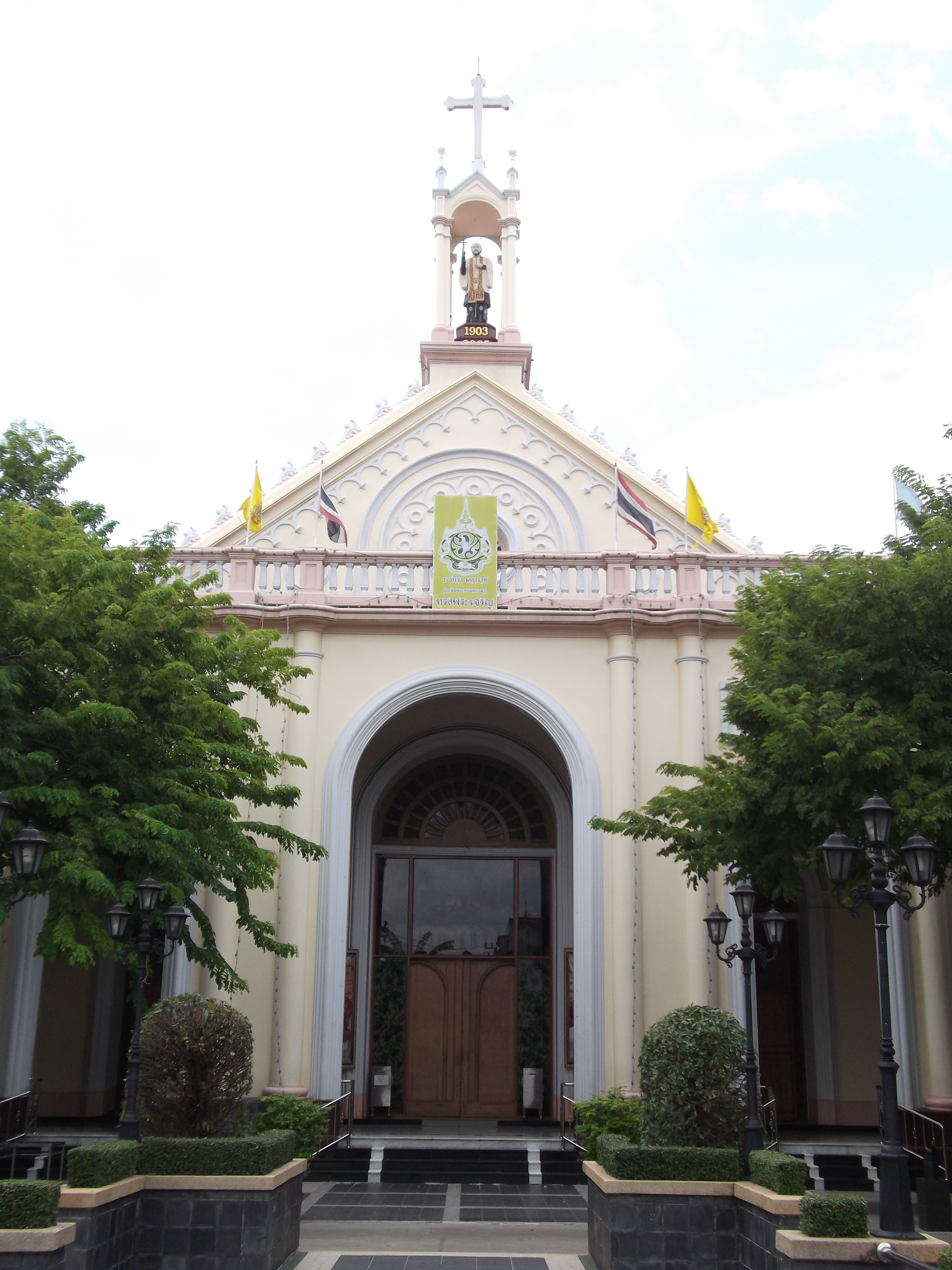
- St. Francis Xavier Church

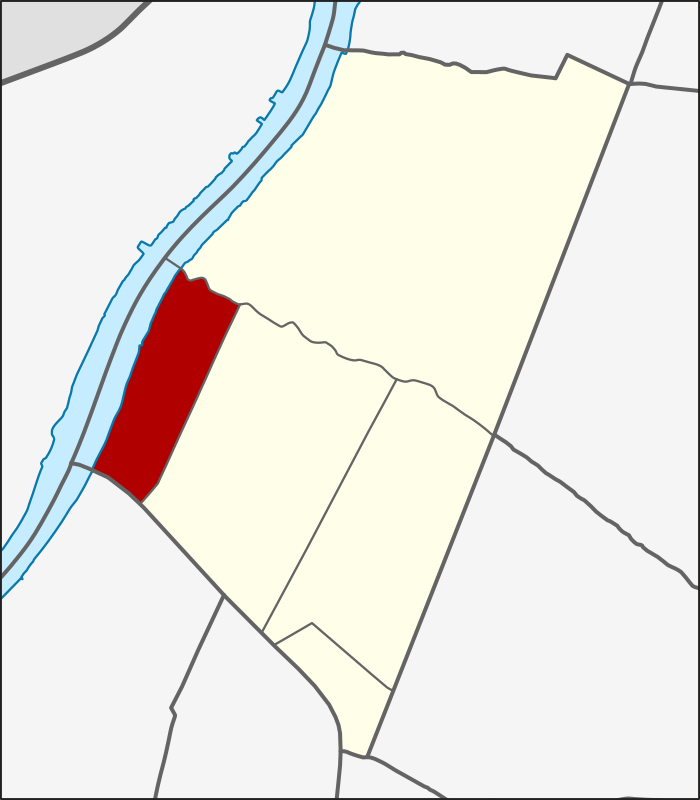
- Location in Dusit District
- Country: Thailand
- Province: Bangkok
- Khet: Dusit

Area
  - Total: 1.074 km^{2} (0.415 sq mi)

Population (2017)
  - Total: 11,267
- Time zone: UTC+7 (ICT)
- Postal code: 10300
- TIS 1099: 100202

Wachiraphayaban (Thai: วชิรพยาบาล) is a khwaeng (subdistrict) of Dusit District, in Bangkok, Thailand.

== History & naming ==
Most areas of Wachiraphayaban are in Samsen quarter, Samsen is an area with a long history before the establishment of Rattanakosin in 1782, since the Ayutthaya period in the reign of King Narai this was where the Immaculate Conception Church was located, and the Portuguese community.

Until the early Rattanakosin period, the Christian Khmers escape their country to settle here with the royal permission of the King Rama I. Later in the reign of King Rama III, there were also a group of Christian Annamese settlers here as well, and they built another church, St. Francis Xavier Church. Thus making Samsen a settlement of both people races, hence the named "Ban Khmer" (บ้านเขมร) and "Ban Yuan" (บ้านญวน—Yuan is old Thai language colloquialism used for Annamese).

Before 1939, then named Ban Yuan Samsen. (บ้านญวนสามเสน)

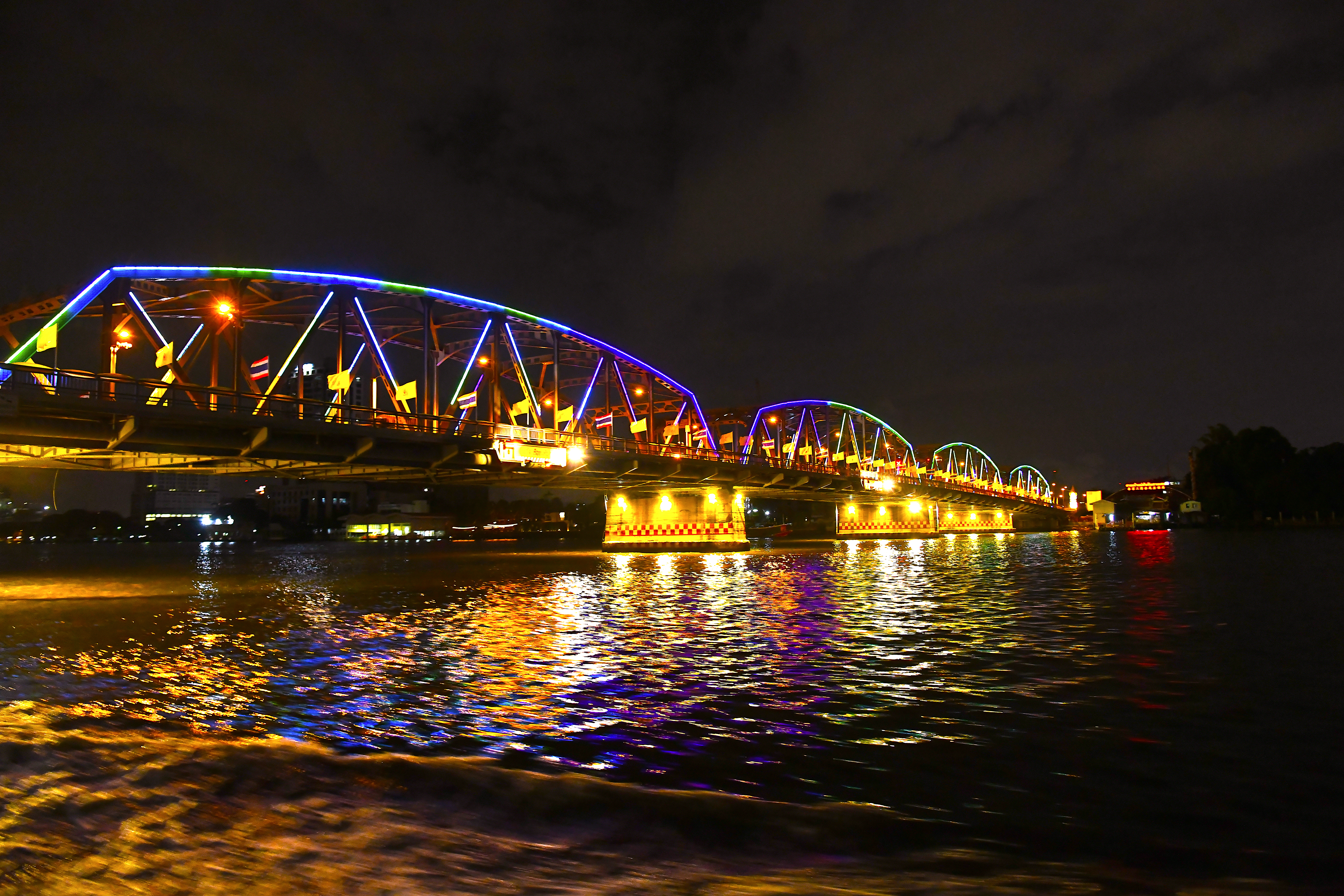
Krung Thon Bridge, also called Sang Hi Bridge, spans the Chao Phraya River, connecting Wachiraphayaban with the Bang Yi Khan and Bang Phlat subdistricts on the Thonburi side

The eponymous Vajira Hospital, the old government hospital since the reign of King Rama VI on Samsen Road.

== Geography ==
Wachiraphayaban can be considered as the western area of the district. It has a total area of 1.074 km^{2} (0.415 mi^{2}).

The area is bordered by neighbouring subdistricts (from the north clockwise): Thanon Nakhon Chai Si in its district (Khlong Samsen is a borderline), Dusit in its district (Samsen Road is a borderline), Wat Sam Phraya of Phra Nakhon District (Khlong Phadung Krung Kasem is a borderline), (across the river) Bang Yi Khan and Bang Phlat of Bang Phlat District (midstream of Chao Phraya River is a borderline).

== Demography ==
In 2017 it had a total population of 11,267 people.
