= Chana Songkhram subdistrict =

Chana Songkhram ชนะสงคราม
- Khwaeng
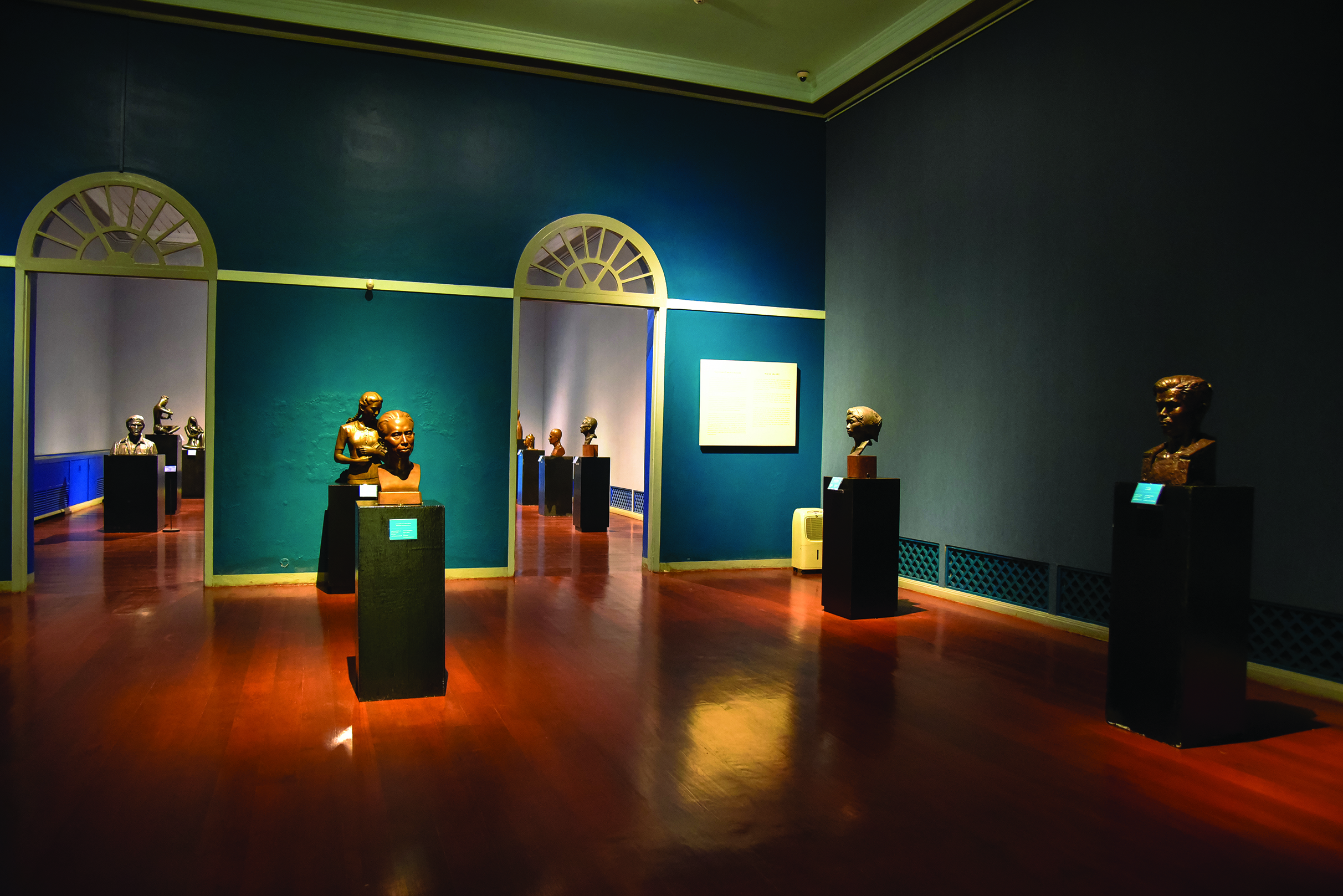
- Inside the National Gallery

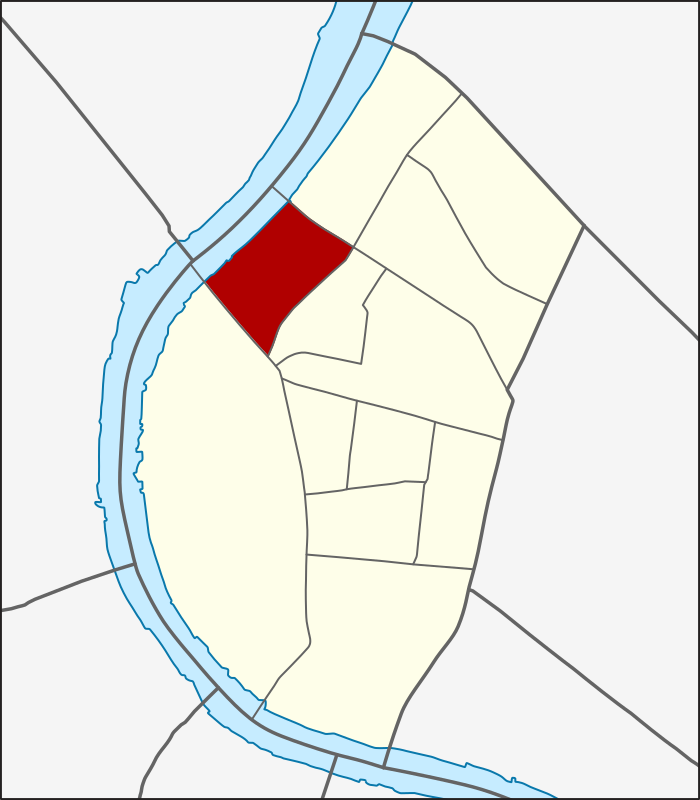
- Location in Phra Nakhon District
- Coordinates: 13°45′43.02″N 100°29′39.62″E
- Country: Thailand
- Province: Bangkok
- Khet: Phra Nakhon

Area
  - Total: 0.339 km^{2} (0.131 sq mi)

Population (2020)
  - Total: 1,776
- Time zone: UTC+7 (ICT)
- Postal code: 10200
- TIS 1099: 100109

Chana Songkhram (Thai: ชนะสงคราม, pronounced [t͡ɕʰā.náʔ sǒŋ.kʰrāːm]) is a khwaeng (subdistrict) of Phra Nakhon District, in Bangkok, Thailand. In 2020, it had a total population of 1,776 people.

== History ==
Originally, "Chana Songkhram" is an official name of amphoe Phra Nakhon. Its name is derived from Wat Chana Songkram, an old local Mon temple.

The upper part of the old city moat, Khlong Khu Mueang Doem used to flow through Chana Songkhram, where it is referred to as Khlong Rong Mai. It was filled in 1971 along with the demolition of the Chaloem Sawan 58 Bridge to make way for the new Phra Pinklao Bridge at that location. Today, the area that used to be a Khlong Rong Mai is Chao Fa Road, where the National Gallery is situated.

== Geography ==
Chana Songkhram is considered to be the northwestern part of the district. The west side is entirely adjacent to the Chao Phraya river and the entire area is in Bangkok's old town zone or Rattanakosin Island. It is considered part of Bang Lamphu.
