= Phra Nakhon district =

District of Bangkok, Thailand

Phra Nakhon พระนคร
- Khet
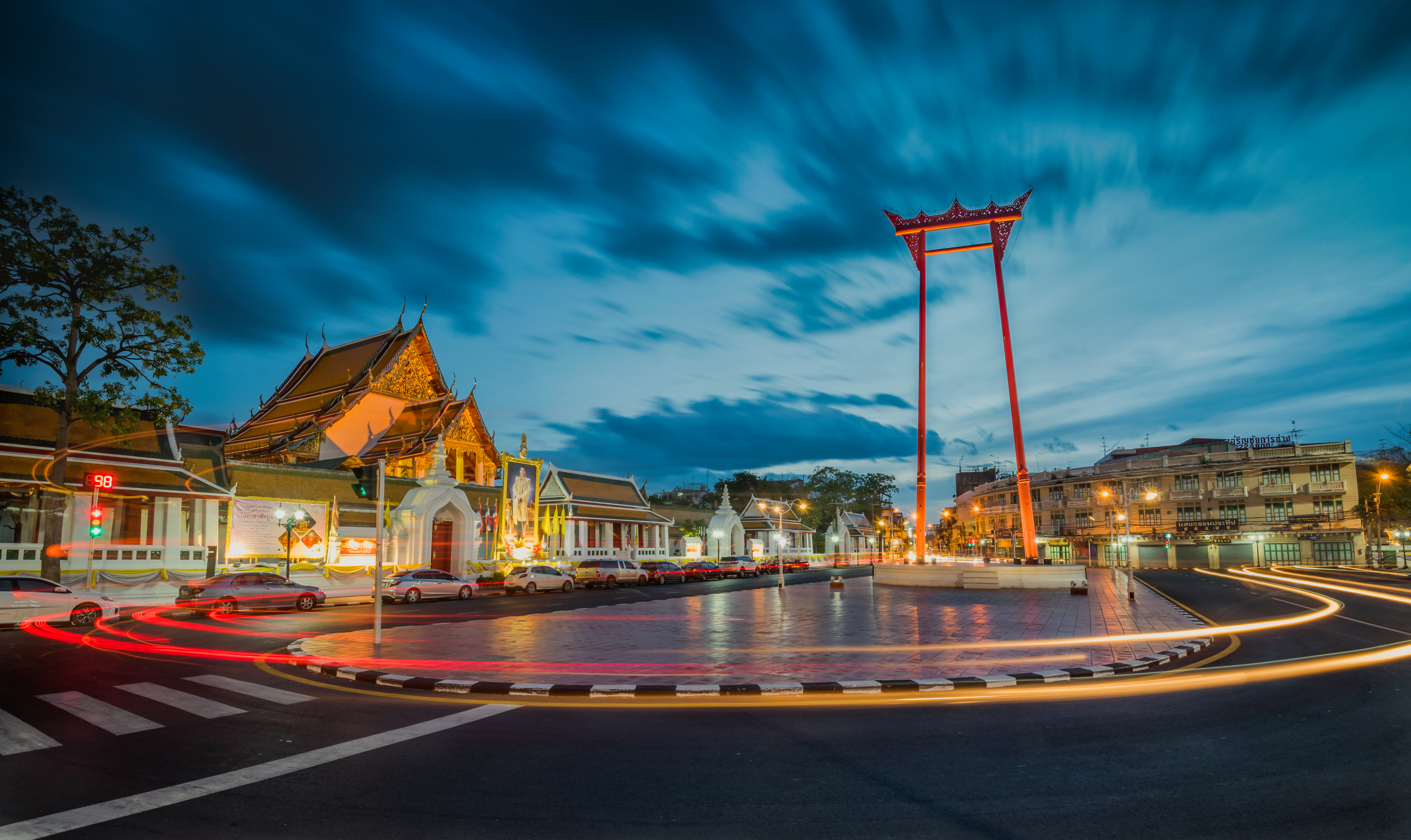
- Giant Swing and Wat Suthat

- District location in Bangkok
- Coordinates: 13°45′52″N 100°29′57″E
- Country: Thailand
- Province: Bangkok
- Seat: Wat Sam Phraya
- Khwaeng: 12

Area
  - Total: 5.536 km^{2} (2.137 sq mi)

Population (2017)
  - Total: 51,231
  - Density: 9,254.15/km^{2} (23,968.1/sq mi)
- Time zone: UTC+7 (ICT)
- Postal code: 10200
- Geocode: 1001

District map

Phra Nakhon (Thai: พระนคร, pronounced [pʰráʔ ná(ʔ).kʰɔ̄ːn]) is one of the 50 districts (khet) of Bangkok, Thailand. It is the central district of Bangkok, including Rattanakosin Island. Neighboring districts are, from the north, clockwise: Dusit, Pom Prap Sattru Phai, Samphanthawong, and across the Chao Phraya River, Thon Buri, Bangkok Yai, Bangkok Noi, and Bang Phlat.

== Location ==
The district is bounded by the Chao Phraya River to the west, Khlong Phadung Krung Kasem in the north, and Ratchadamnoen Road and Khlong Ong Ang to the east. The center of Bangkok, marked by the city pillar shrine (lak mueang), is in the district. Also surrounding the large open space of the Sanam Luang are the Grand Palace and Wat Phra Kaew, the National Museum in the former palace of the Vice King, and the main campus of Thammasat University as well as Silpakorn University.

Other significant landmarks in the district include Wat Pho, the Giant Swing, Wat Suthat, Wat Ratchanadda (with Loha Prasat), and the Democracy Monument. Also the well-known Khaosan Road is in the district. Another significant temple is Wat Bowonniwet, where several Thai kings were ordained as monks.

Of the original 14 forts protecting Bangkok only two survive. Fort Phra Sumen in the northern corner of the district, and Fort Mahakan in the east. Since 2000 a small park named Santichaiphrakarn around Fort Phra Sumen was built.

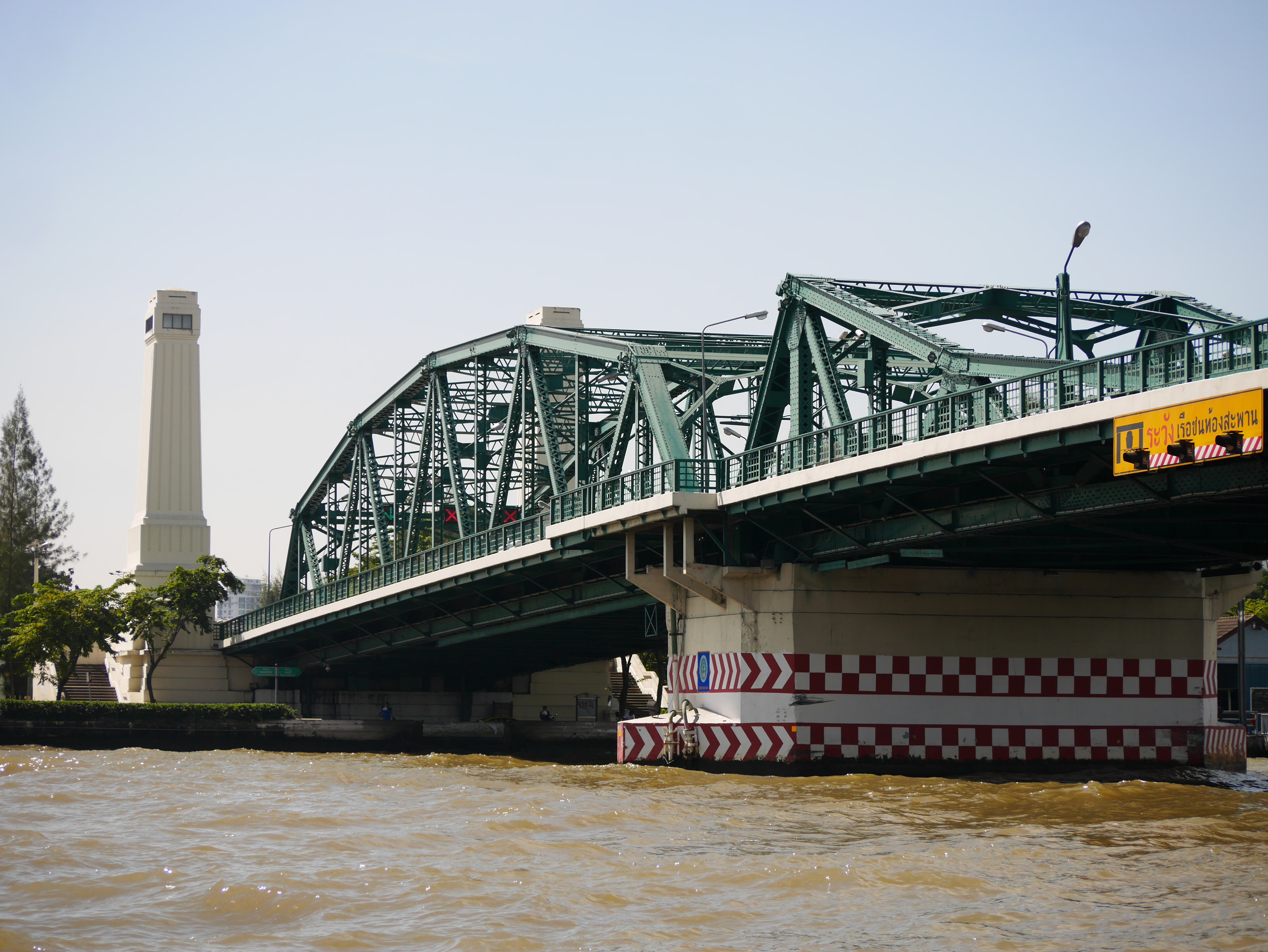
Memorial Bridge

In 2005 the riverfront of the Phra Nakhon District, from King Rama I Bridge (Memorial Bridge) in the south to the Wasukri Pier (Dusit district), was submitted to the UNESCO for consideration as a future world heritage site.

Another landmark is Sala Chalermkrung Royal Theatre on Charoen Krung Road. It is Bangkok's oldest cinema and was the first air conditioned theater in Thailand. Built at the order of King Prajadhipok and named by him, it opened on 2 July 1933. It is the only theater from the first "golden age" of Thai cinema still standing. No longer regularly showing movies, the theater has been renovated and is principally used for Thai dance performances. Another point of interest is the Pak Khlong Talat flower market. Tha Phra Chan is a well-known Thai amulets market.

The area around Phahurat Road (พาหุรัด) can be considered Thailand's "Little India". The road was constructed during King Chulalongkorn's reign over a century ago and Indian community started to form after that. Siri Guru Singh Sabha, Thailand's first Sikh temple was built in 1933 near the road. The area is well known for Indian fabric shops and Indian cuisine.

== History ==
Phra Nakhon was once an amphoe (district) named Chana Songkhram (อำเภอชนะสงคราม). The administration was overhauled on 15 October 1915 when 25 new districts were created for inner Bangkok. On 12 March 1928, six of these districts: Phahurat, Samran Rat, Phra Ratchawang, Chana Songkhram, Sam Yot, and Bang Khun Phrom were merged to form Amphoe Phra Nakhon. It became Khet (district) Phra Nakhon in 1972.

== Culture ==
=== Festivals ===
Songkran, the traditional Thai New Year festival, is celebrated throughout the country from 13 to 15 April of each year. Khaosan Road (or Khao Sarn Road) in Phra Nakhon district is a notable place to celebrate the event where many people, both locals and tourists, splash water.

During another famous festival, Loy Krathong, on the 15th day of the 12th lunar month, the Chao Phraya River bank in the district, with numerous piers and Phra Sumen Fort, is a popular place to float lanterns on the water.

Ratchadamnoen Avenue is often heavily decorated with lights around the king's birthday (28 July), the queen mother's birthday (12 August), National Day (5 December) and other major anniversaries. Sanam Luang and recently created Lan Plabpla Maha Chedsada Bodin (ลานพลับพลามหาเจษฎาบดินทร์) in front of Wat Ratchanadda and its Loha Prasat are open spaces that frequently used to celebrate events.

== Administration ==
The district is divided into 12 sub-districts (khwaeng).

1.	Phra Borom Maha Ratchawang	พระบรมมหาราชวัง	7.	Bowon Niwet	บวรนิเวศ
2.	Wang Burapha Phirom	วังบูรพาภิรมย์	8.	Talat Yot	ตลาดยอด
3.	Wat Ratchabophit	วัดราชบพิธ	9.	Chana Songkhram	ชนะสงคราม
4.	Samran Rat	สำราญราษฎร์	10.	Ban Phan Thom	บ้านพานถม
5.	San Chaopho Suea	ศาลเจ้าพ่อเสือ	11.	Bang Khun Phrom	บางขุนพรหม
6.	Sao Chingcha	เสาชิงช้า	12.	Wat Sam Phraya	วัดสามพระยา

== Gallery ==
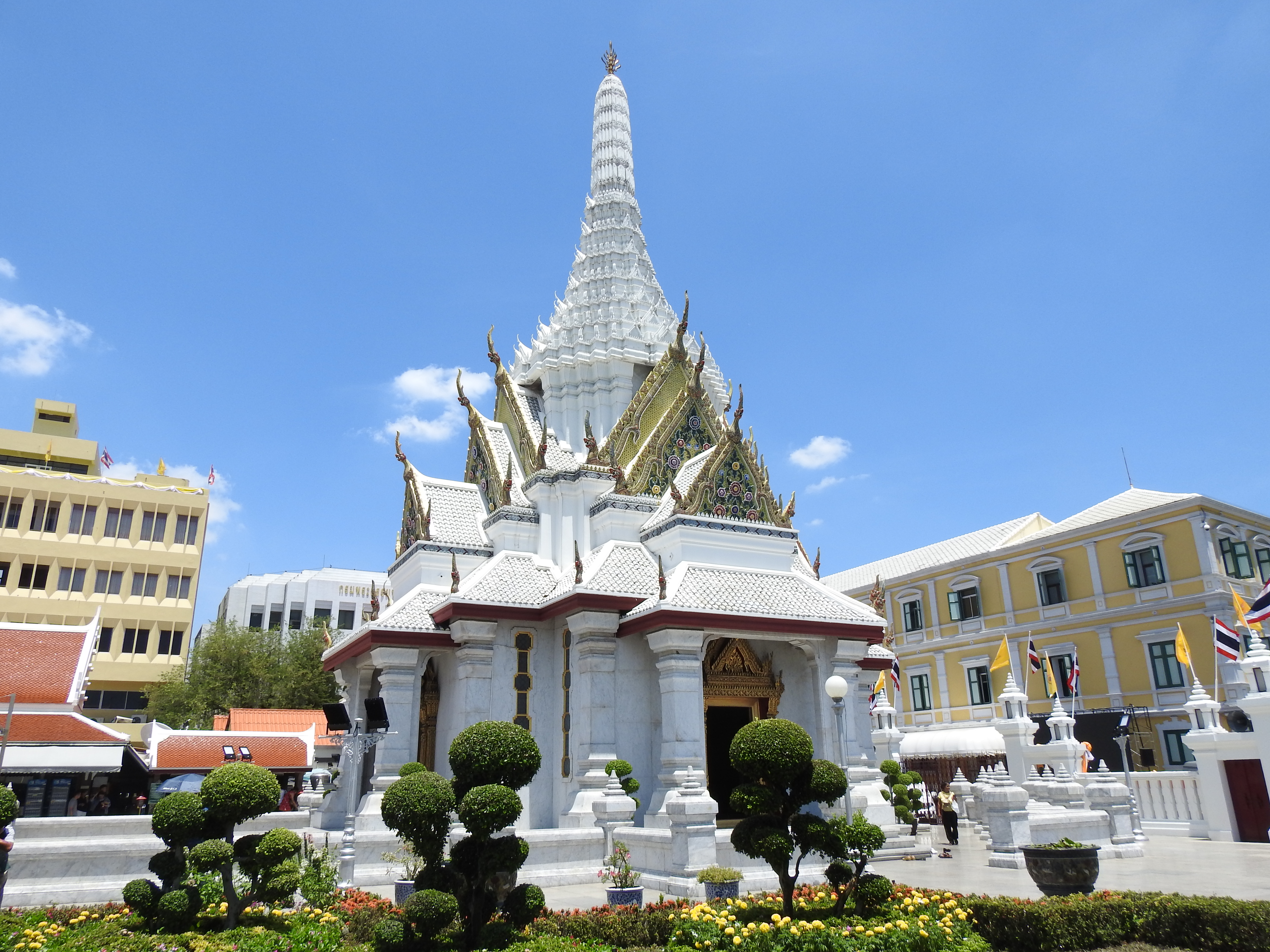
The city pillar shrine (หลักเมือง, Lak Mueang) marks the center of Bangkok

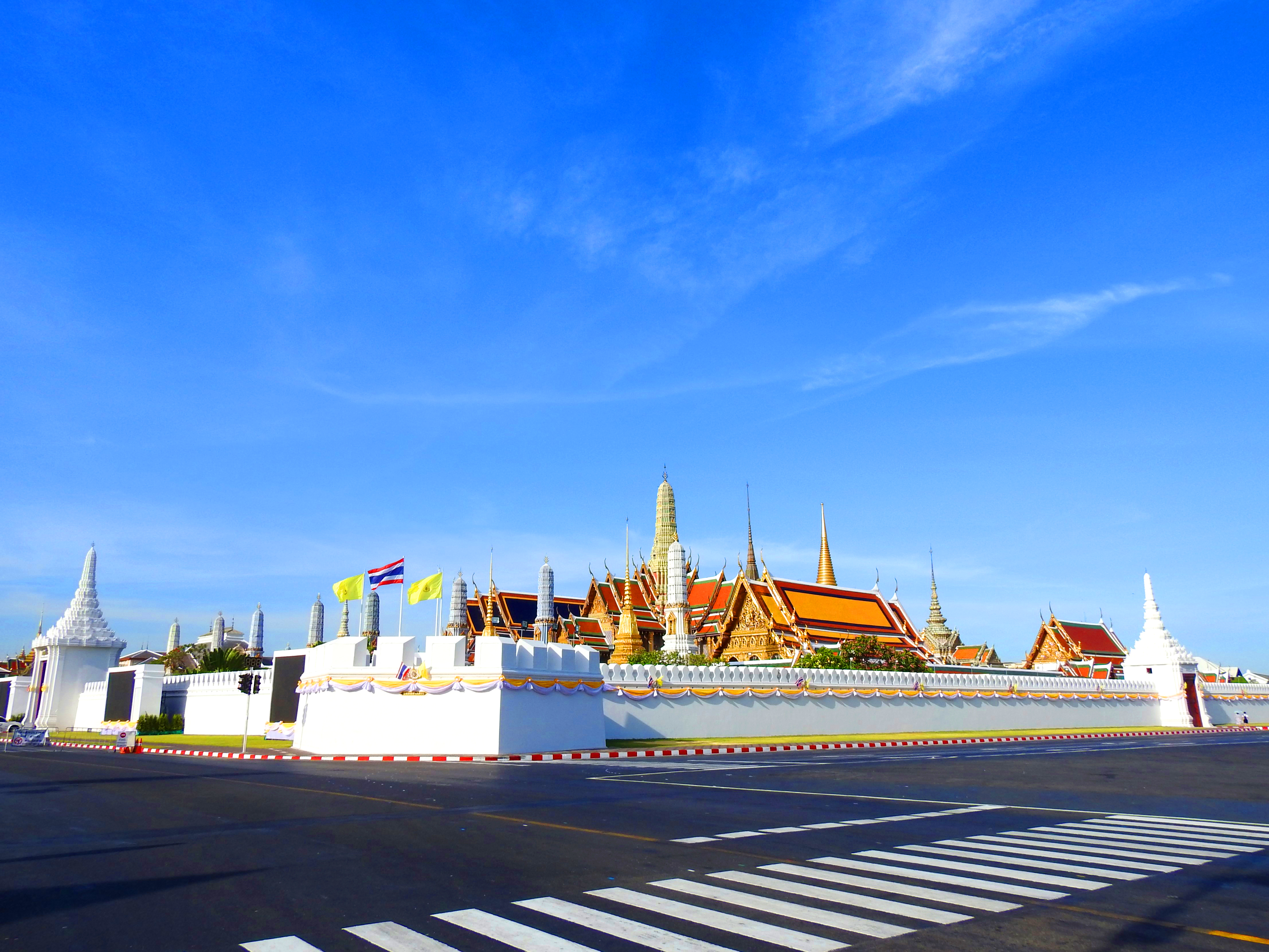
Grand Palace in the corner of Sanam Luang

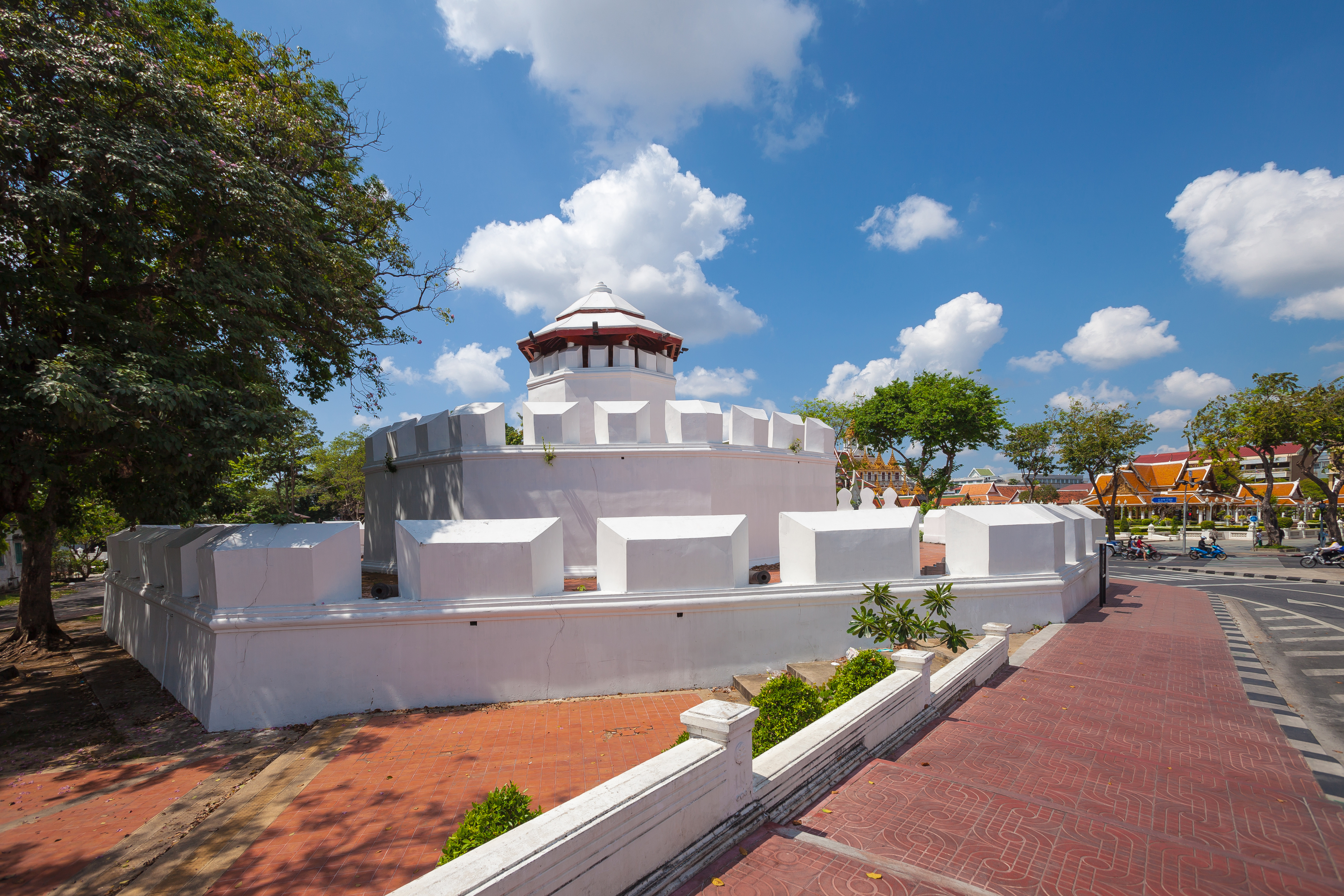
Fort Mahakan, one of 14 forts protecting Bangkok

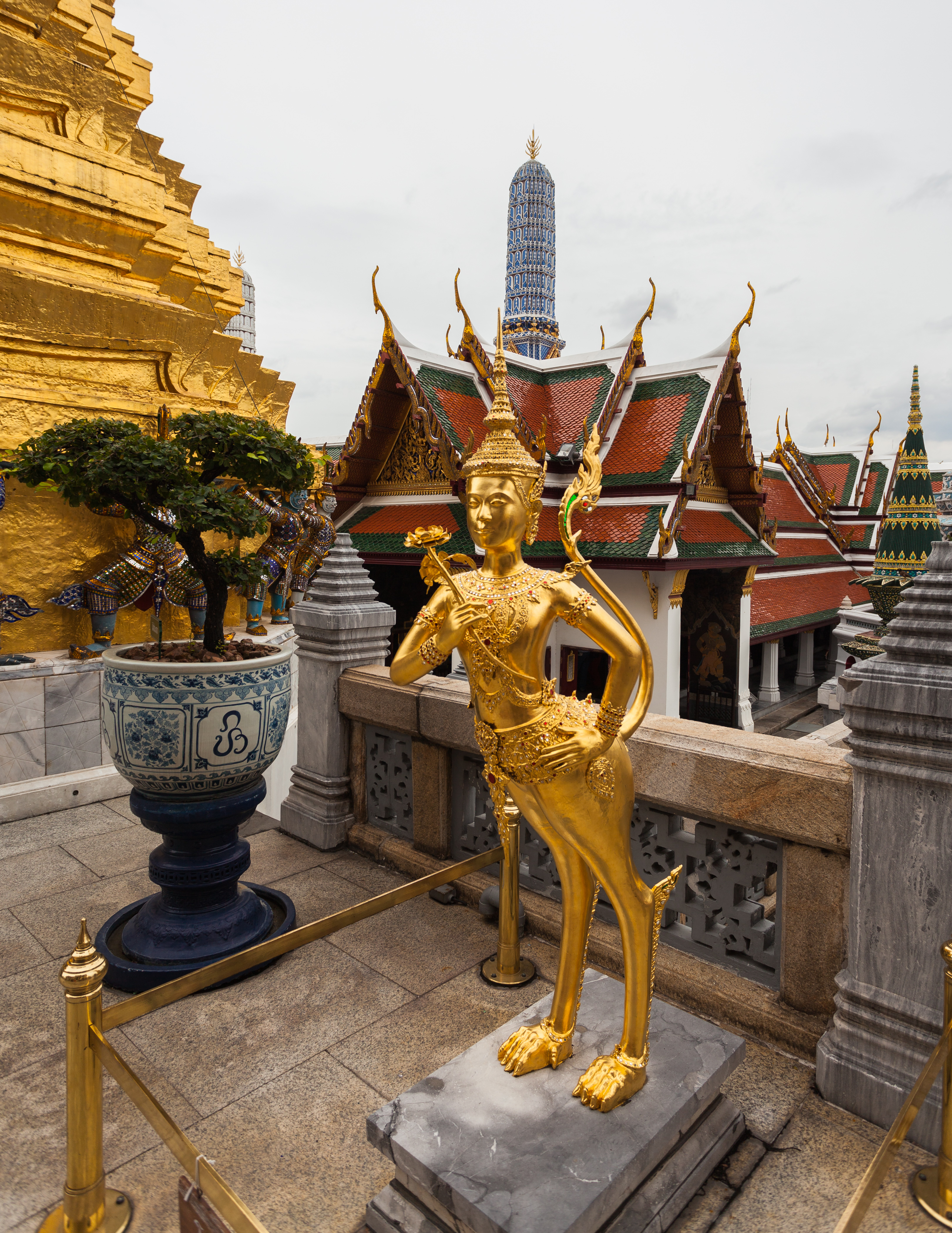
Kinnari statue inside Grand Palace

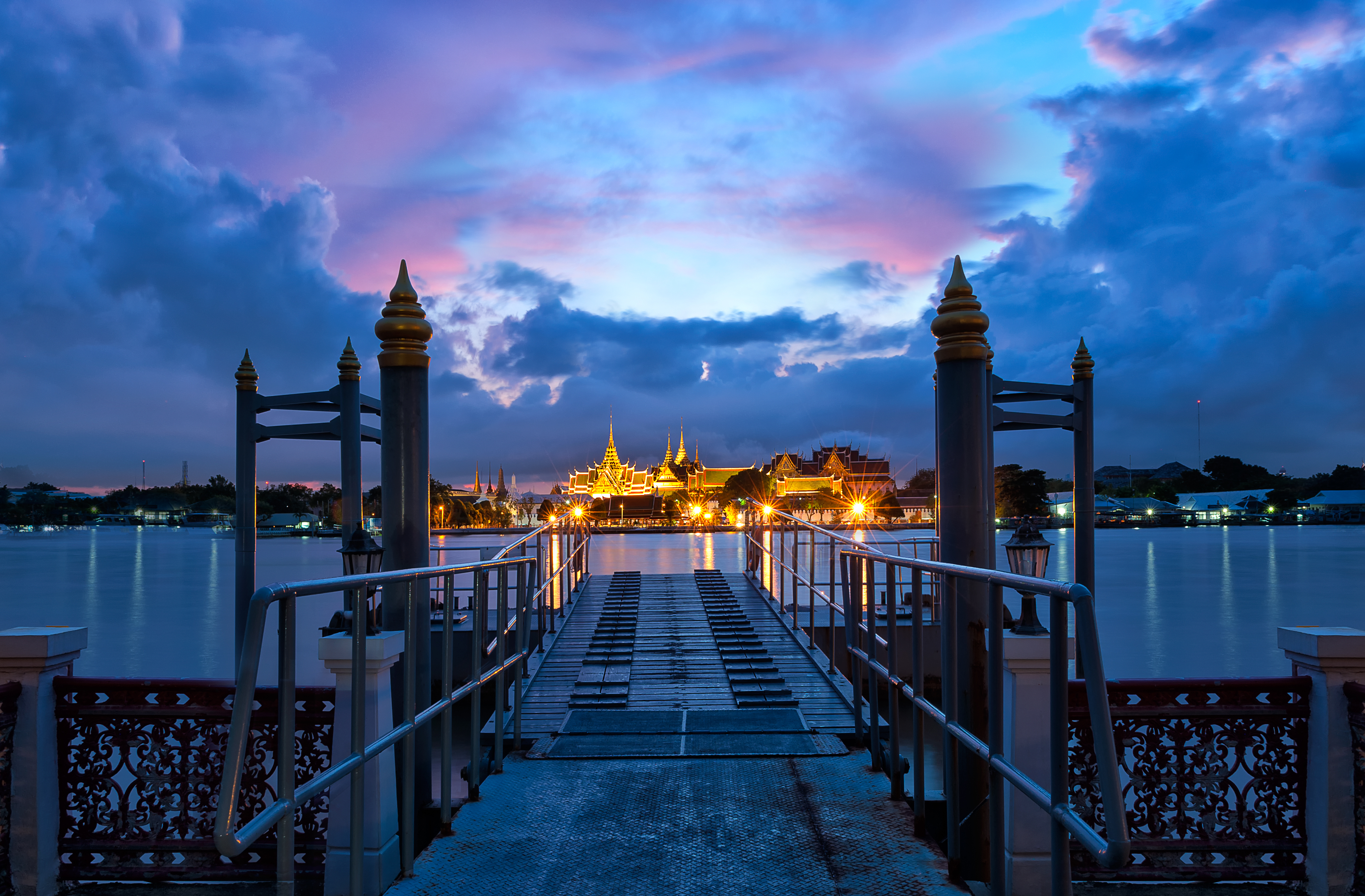
Grand Palace viewed from Thonburi side across Chao Phraya River

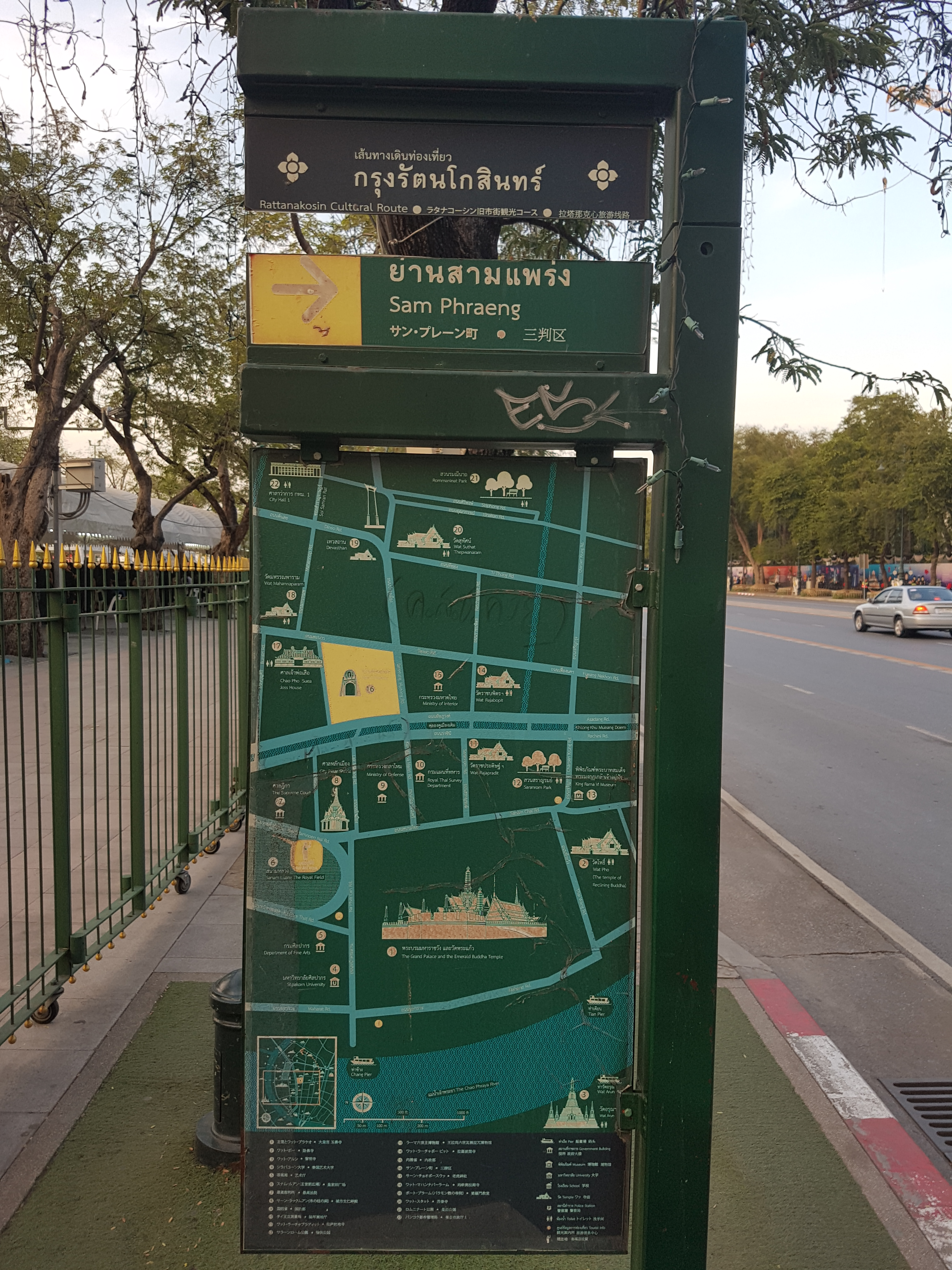
Tourist sign installed on the side of Sanam Luang

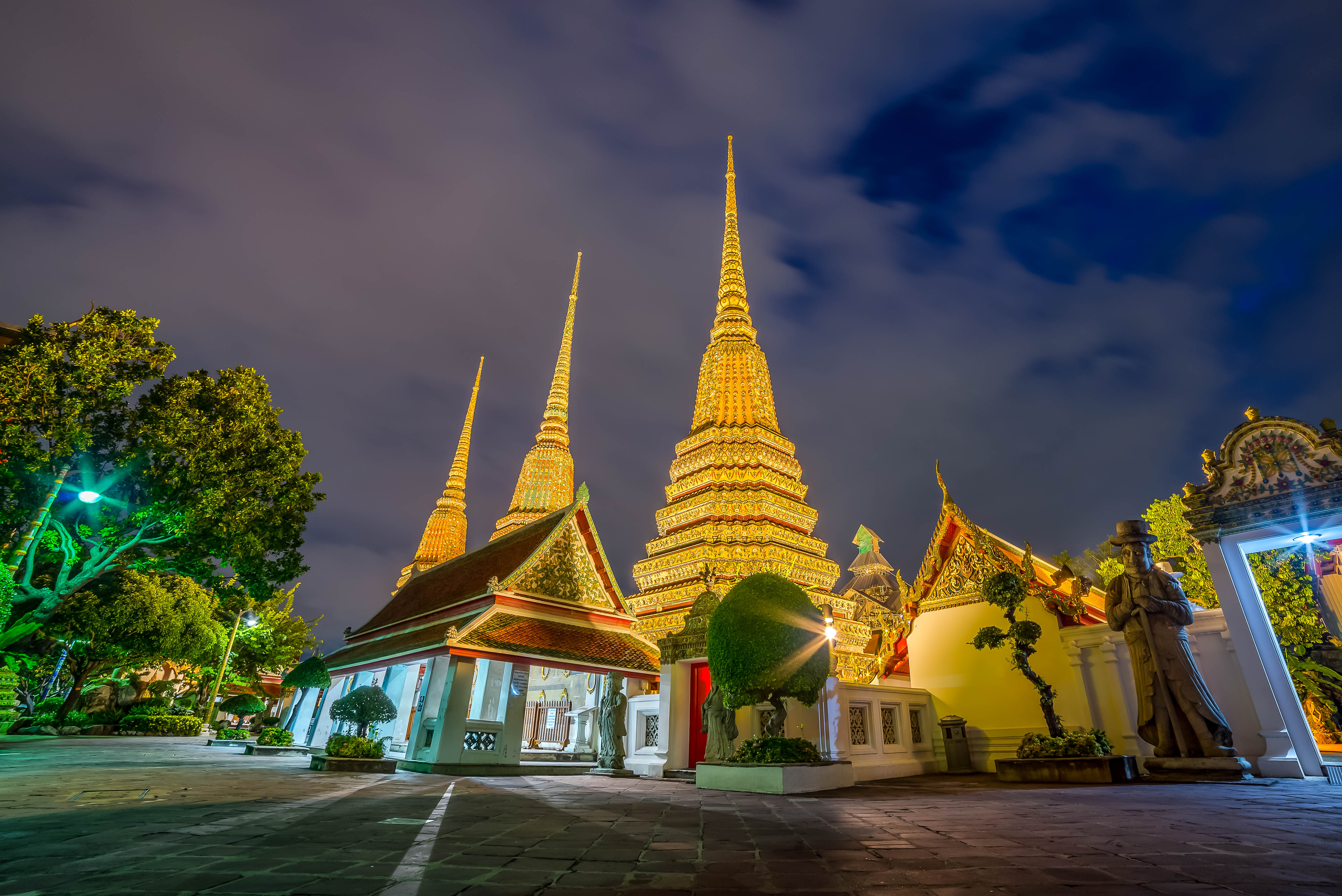
Wat Pho

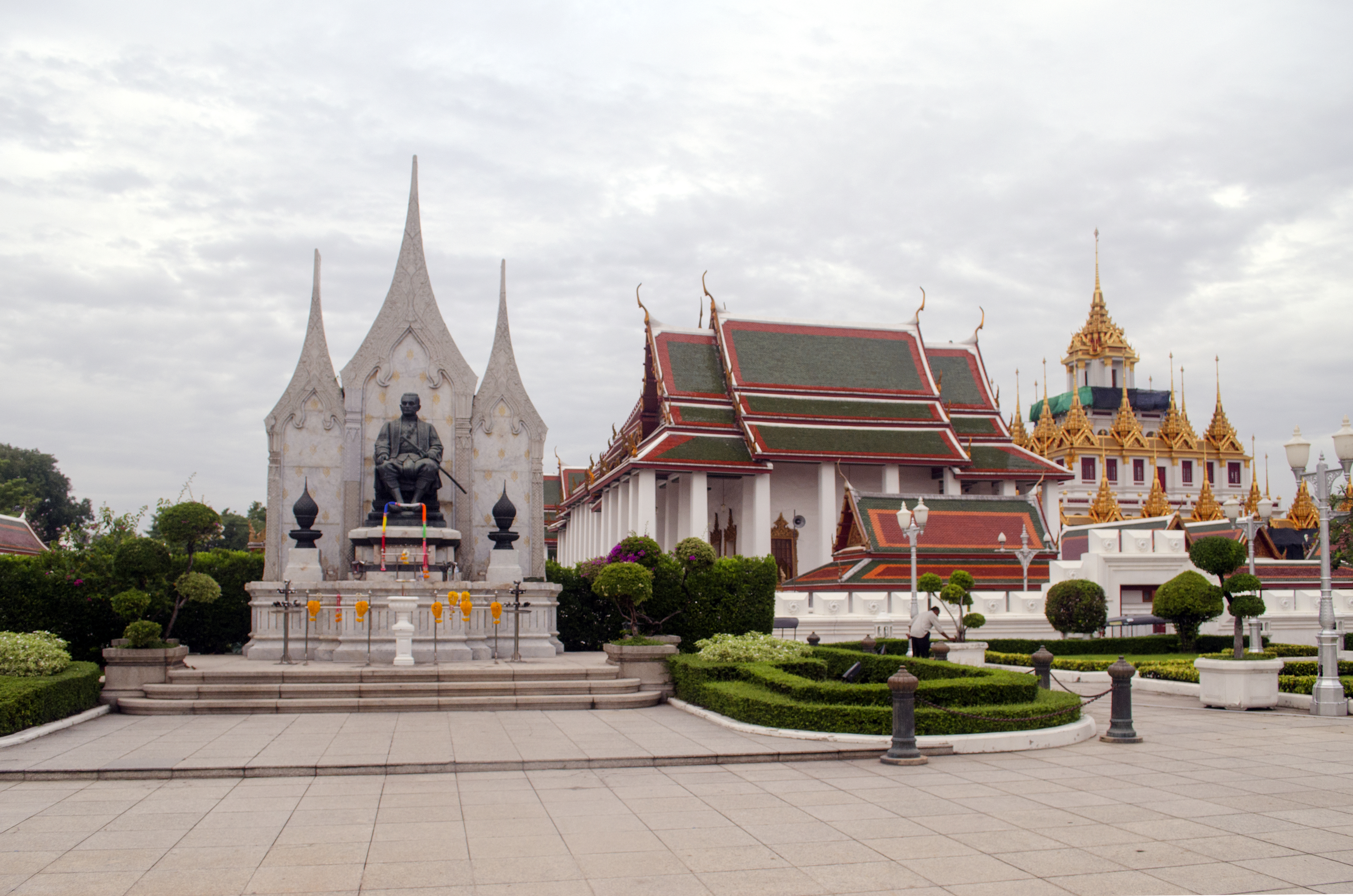
King Rama III Memorial on Lan Plabpla Maha Chedsada Bodin (foreground), Wat Ratchanadda with Loha Prasat (background)

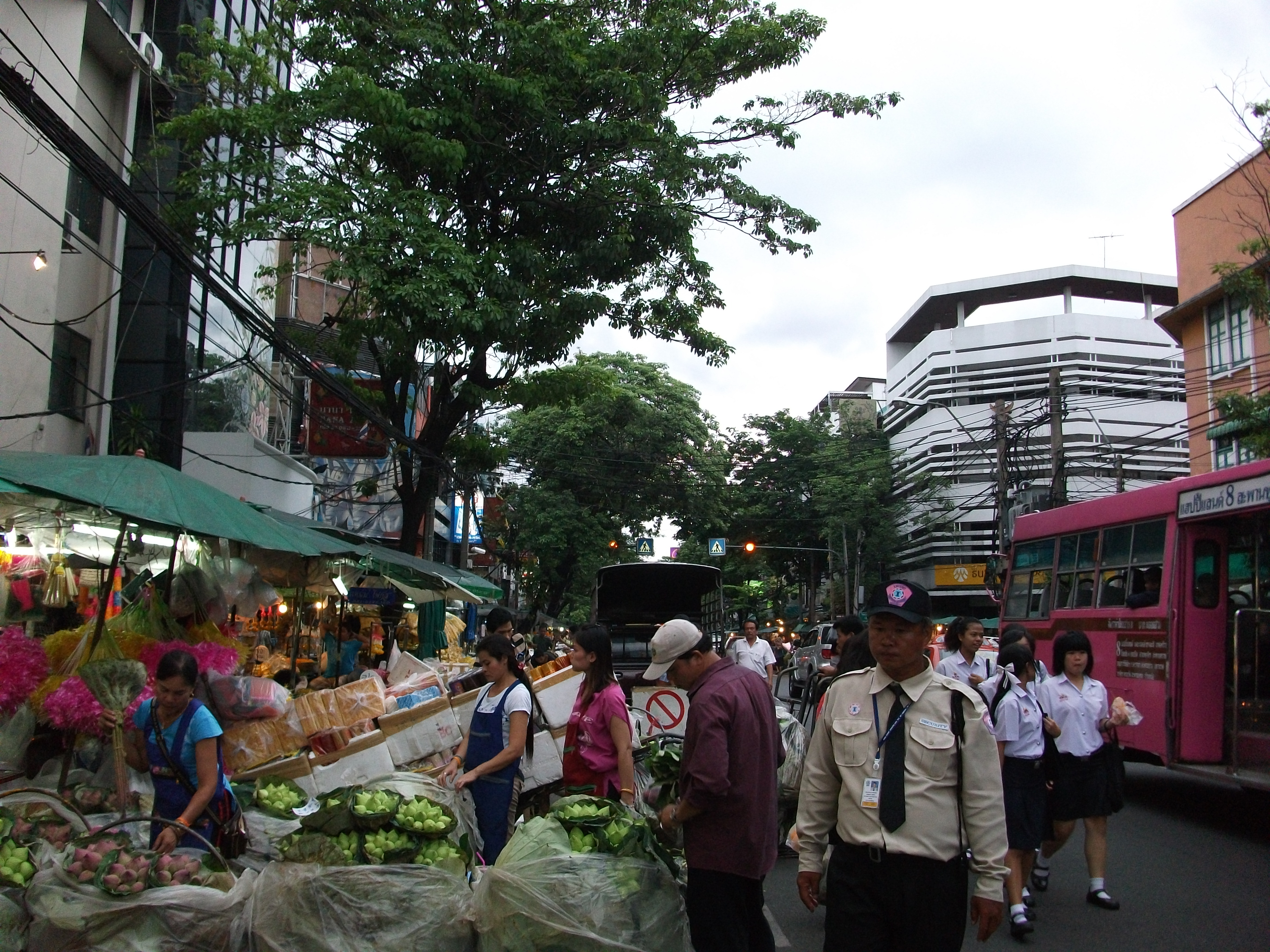
Pak Khlong Talat, largest flower market in Bangkok and Thailand

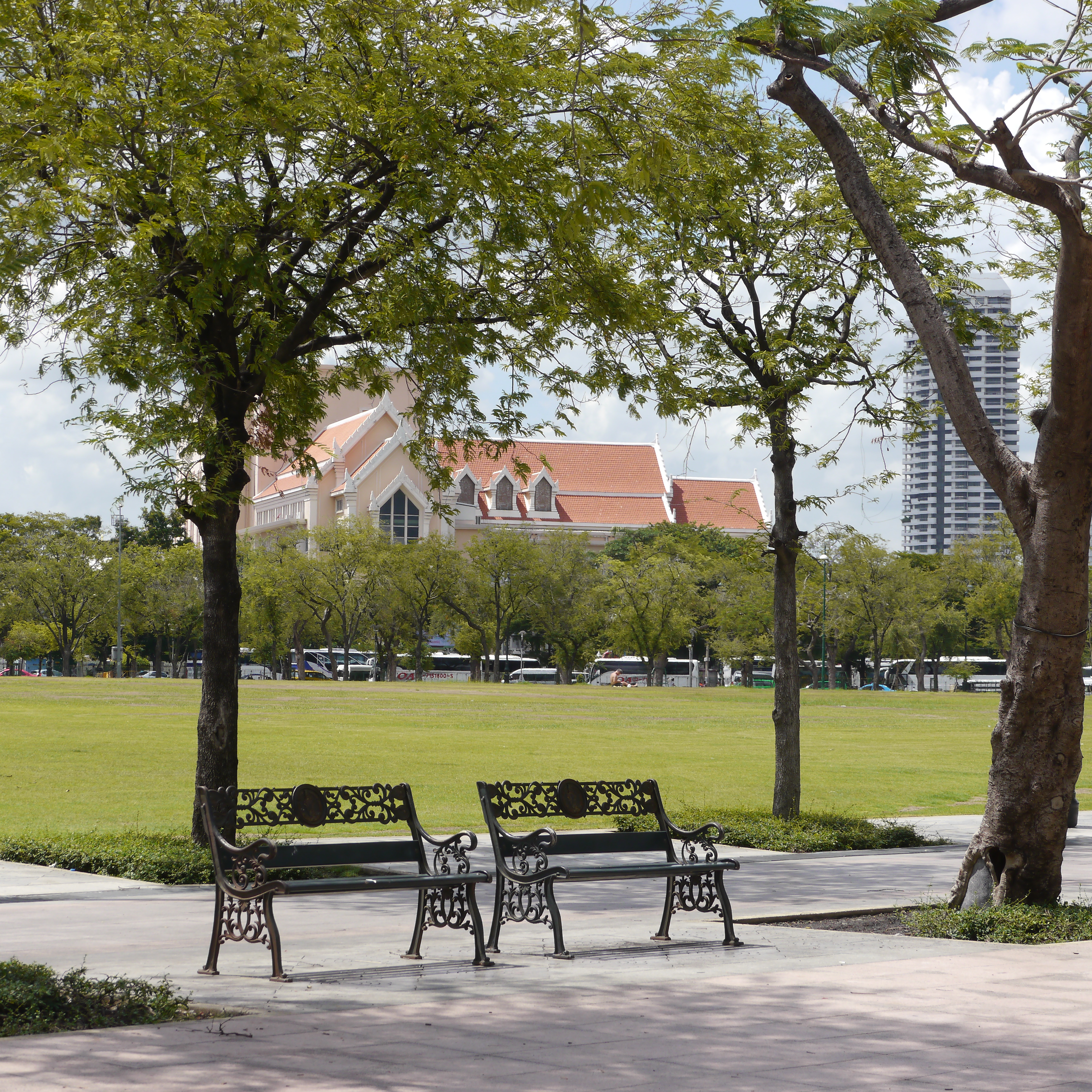
Sanam Luang
