= Norarat Sathan Bridge =

Norarat Sathan Bridge สะพานนรรัตน์สถาน
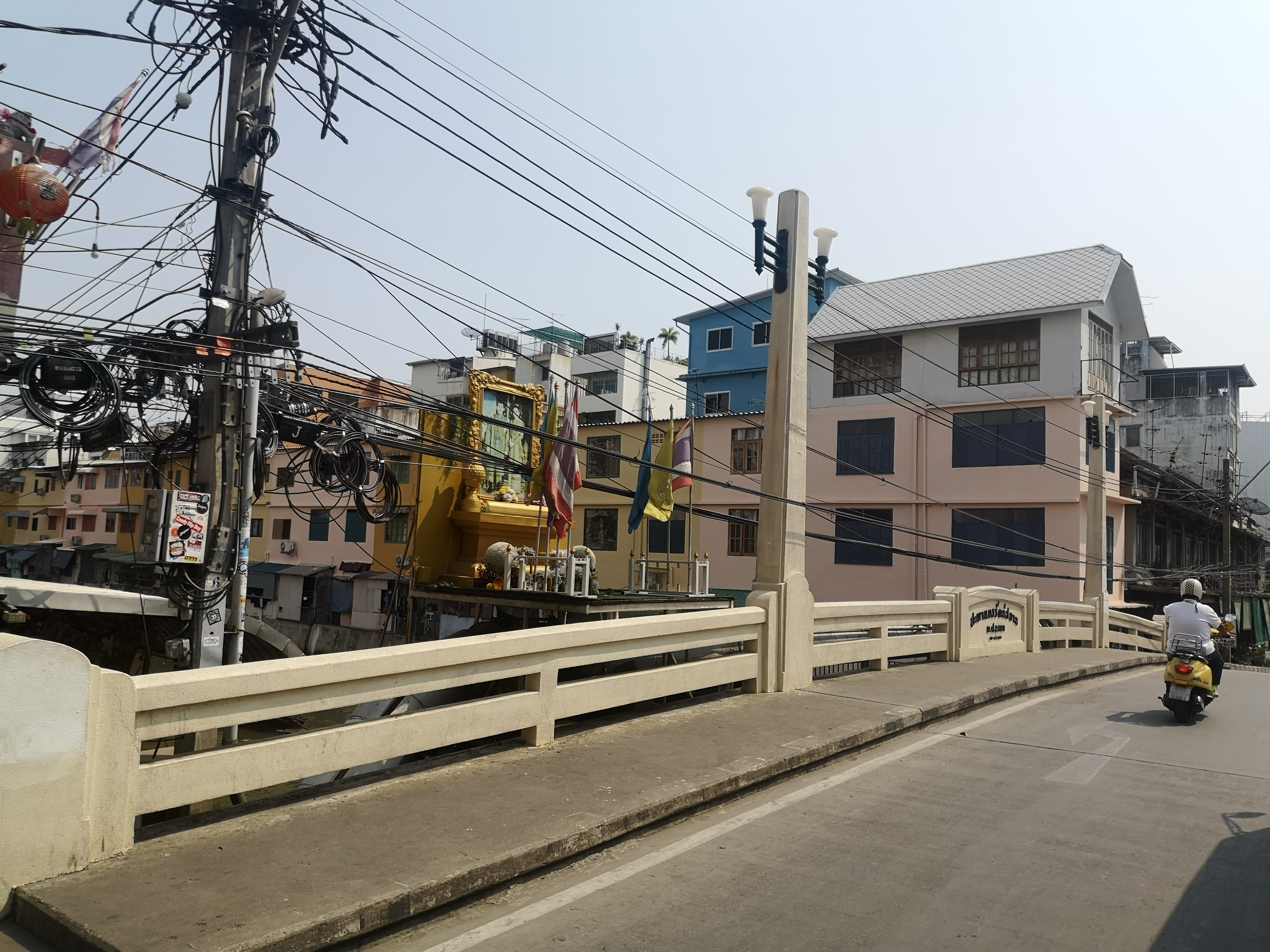
- Norarat Sathan Bridge in March 2024.
- Coordinates: 13°45′46″N 100°29′55″E
- Carries: Samsen Road
- Crosses: Khlong Rop Krung (Khlong Bang Lamphu)
- Locale: Chana Songkhram and Talat Yot Sub-Districts, Phra Nakhon District, Bangkok, Thailand
- Maintained by: Bangkok Metropolitan Administration (BMA)

Characteristics
- Total length: 30.16 m
- Width: 15.8 m

History
- Opened: 1943

Location
- Interactive map of Norarat Sathan Bridge

Norarat Sathan Bridge (Thai: สะพานนรรัตน์สถาน, RTGS: Saphan Norrarat Sathan, pronounced [sà.pʰāːn nɔːn.ná.rát sà.tʰǎːn]) is a historic bridge in Bangkok. It spans the northern section of the Khlong Rop Krung, known as Khlong Bang Lamphu. It is one of the bridges crossing Khlong Bang Lamphu in the Bang Lamphu area, along with nearby Wan Chat Bridge, which lies further downstream. The bridge is 15.8 m (51.8 ft) wide and 30.16 m (99.0 ft) long, with sidewalks 1.6 m (5.2 ft) wide on each side. It connects Chakrabongse Road to the southwest with Samsen Road to the northeast. At the foot of the bridge on the Chakrabongse side is Bang Lamphu Intersection, where Chakrabongse Road meets Phra Sumen Road. On the southeastern corner of the intersection along Chakrabongse Road once stood the New World Department Store, a prominent and popular landmark of the Bang Lamphu district. It was later abandoned, and the lower floors became flooded, eventually turning into a well-known "fish sanctum." Once entering the Samsen side, the area is considered outside the Rattanakosin Island zone.

Originally, it was an unnamed wooden bridge. In 1899, it was rebuilt as an elegant steel-structured bridge, while the bridge deck remained wooden and was equipped with rollers underneath, allowing it to be opened and closed to let boats pass, with fortress-like structures on both sides resembling gate passages, though without actual doors like those of other city gates of Rattanakosin. As a result, the area came to be known as "Pratu Mai" (ประตูใหม่, lit. 'new gate').

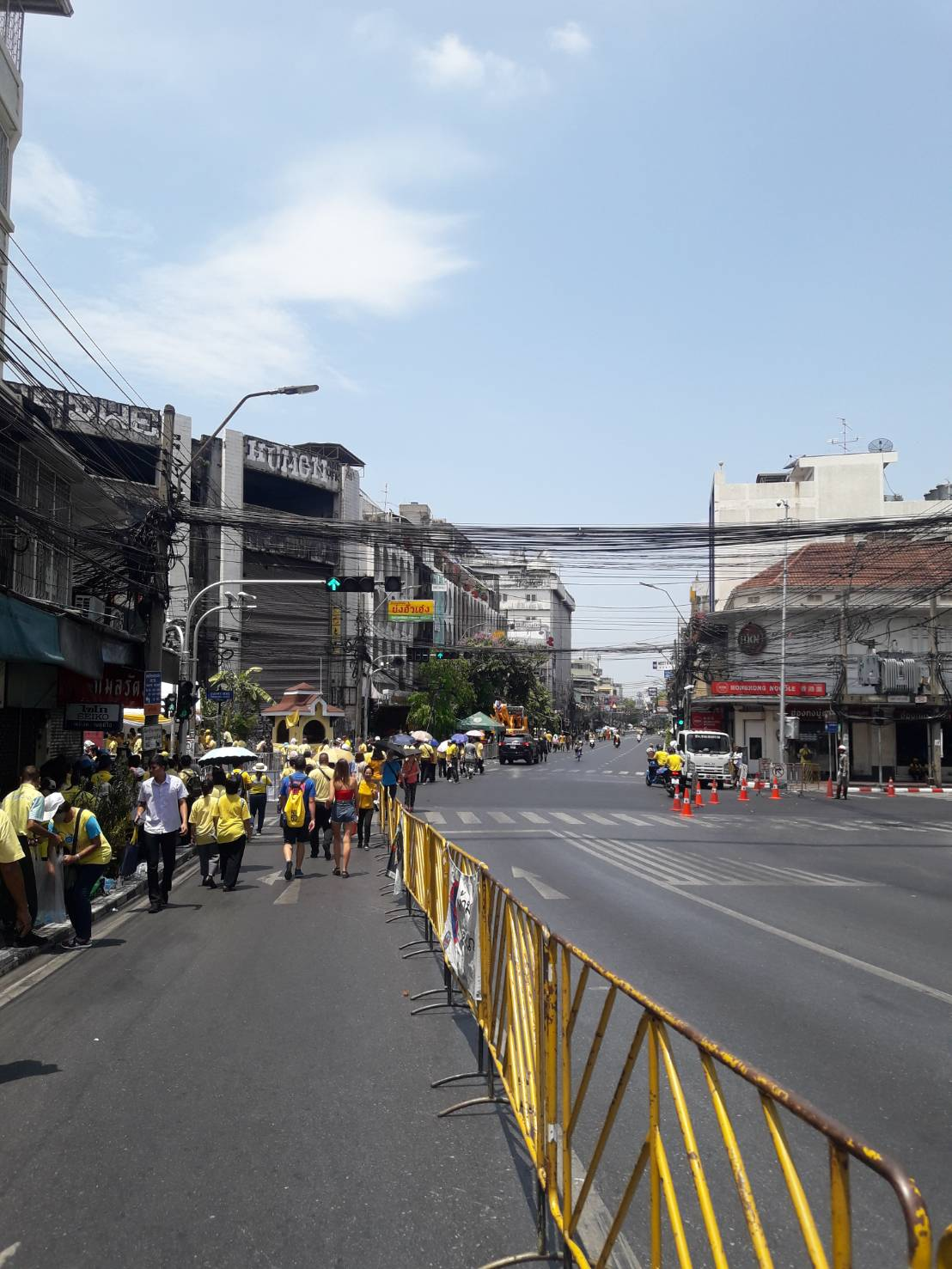
Bang Lamphu Intersection as seen from the foot of the bridge in 2019, with the New World Department Store visible ahead on the left.

During the era when trams operated in Bangkok (from the reign of King Rama V until 1968), when a tram reached this point, the conductor would call out, "Bang Lamphu, Pratu Mai!"

The present concrete bridge was constructed in 1943. The name "Norrarat Sathan" means "the residence of Norrarat," referring to its location near the home of Chao Phraya Norrarat Ratchamanit (To Manitkul), a high-ranking noble during the reign of King Rama V.
