= Bang Lamphu =

Neighborhood in Bangkok, Thailand

Coordinates: 13°45′8.93″N 100°30′4.1″E

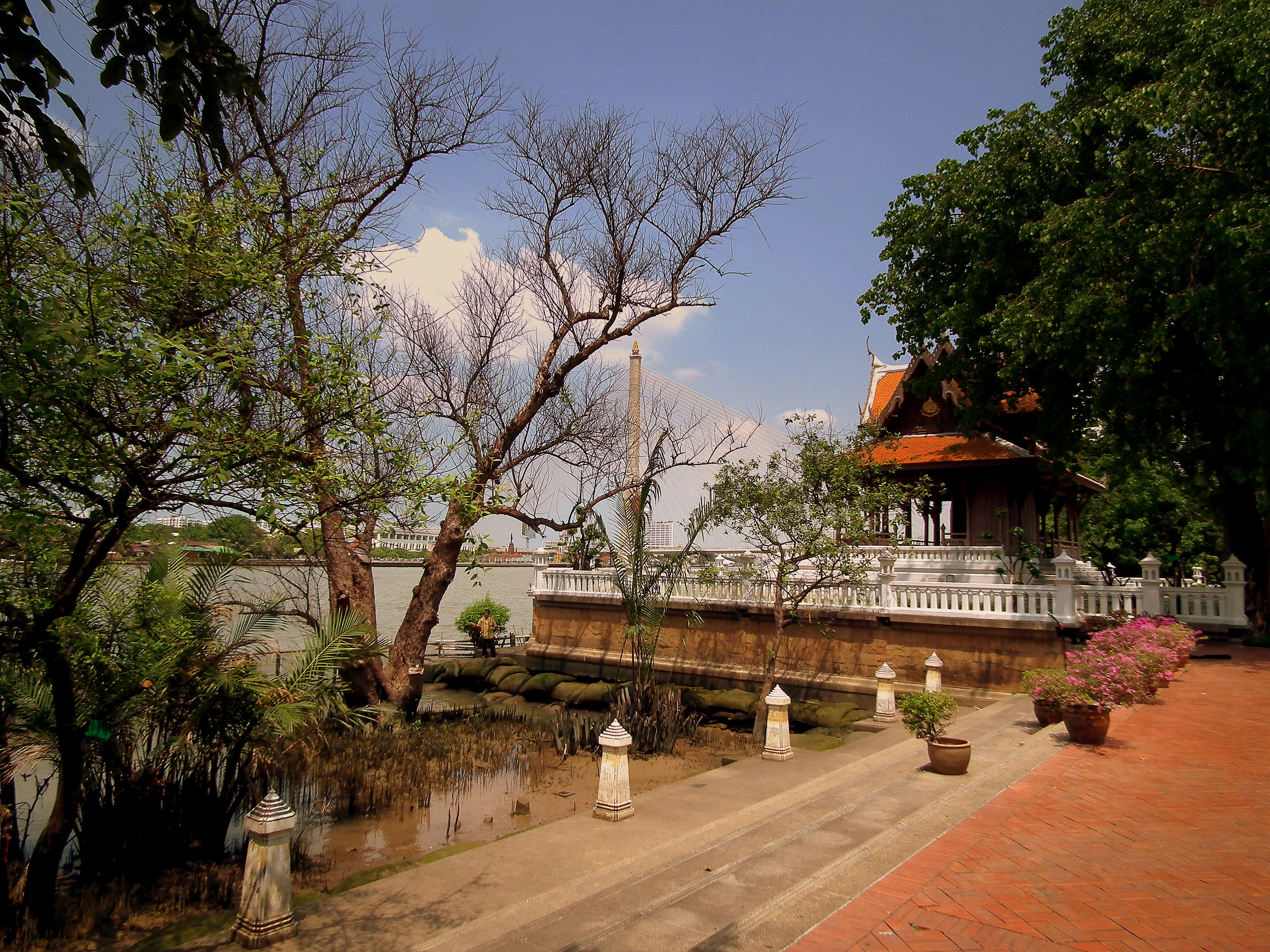
The last mangrove apple in Bangkok, whose name is the origin of Bang Lamphu

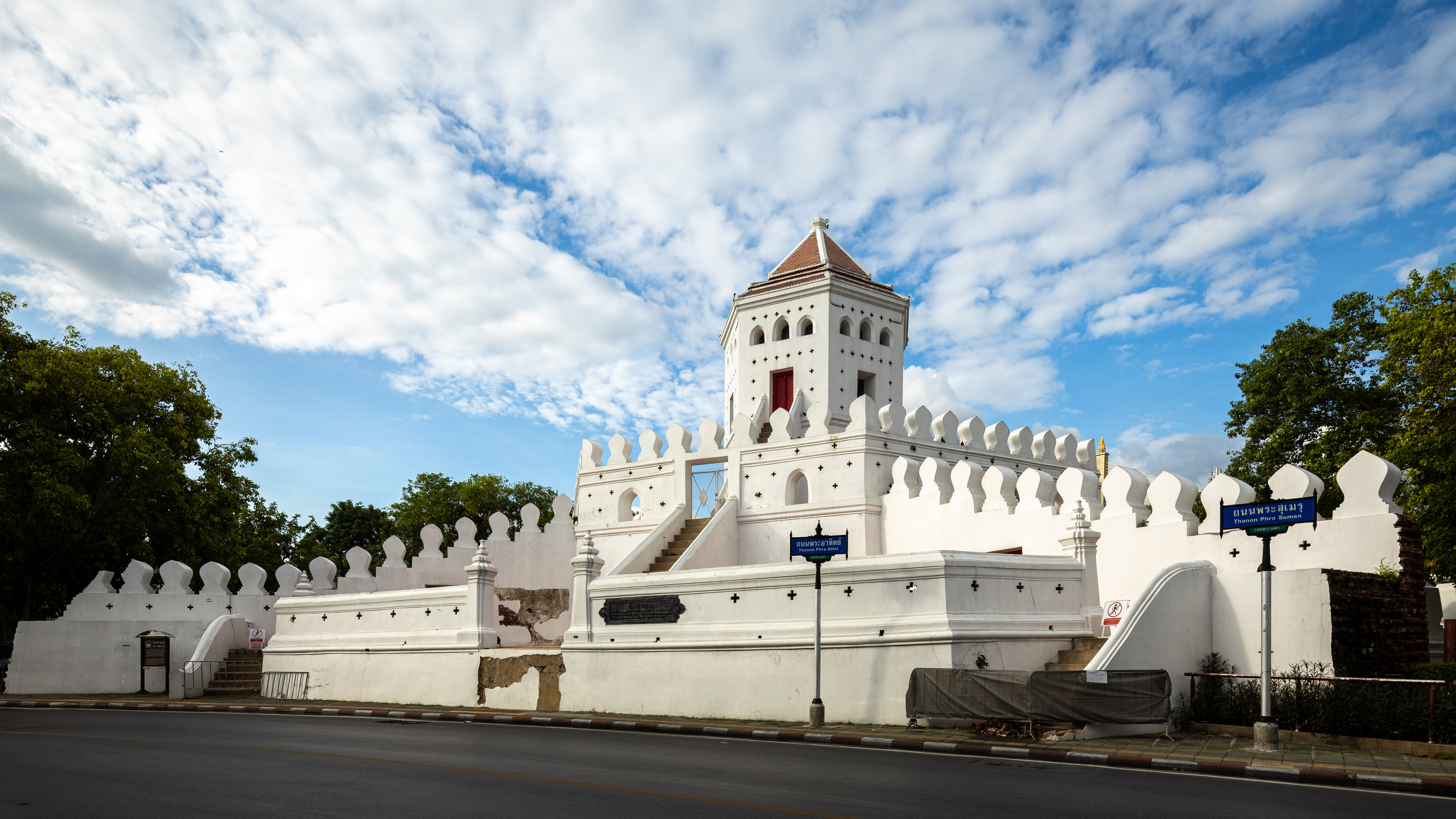
Phra Sumen Fort, one of Bang Lamphu's landmarks located beside to Santi Chai Prakan Park on Phra Athit Road

Bang Lamphu, also spelled Banglampoo or Banglamphu (Thai: บางลำพู, pronounced [bāːŋ lām.pʰūː]; in the past, it was often misspelled บางลำภู) is a neighbourhood in Bangkok located in Phra Nakhon District. The history of the Bang Lamphu community dates to the establishment of the Rattanakosin Kingdom, or earlier. Bang Lamphu covers the area north of Phra Nakhon, both inside and outside Rattanakosin Island, stretching from Phra Athit to Samsen Roads, which lead toward Dusit District. Most of Bang Lamphu lies within Talat Yot Subdistrict, with parts extending into nearby subdistricts such as Chana Songkhram, Bowon Niwet, Ban Phan Thom, and up to Wat Sam Phraya.

== History ==
The name "Bang Lamphu" can mean "area of mangrove apple" (lamphu is Thai for mangrove apple). Mangrove apples (Sonneratia caseolaris) once flourished along waterways in the area, including the Khlong Bang Lamphu and Chao Phraya River. There are no more mangrove apple trees in the local Santi Chai Prakan Park, since the last one died in 2012 from the 2011 Thailand floods, but the name Bang Lamphu is still commonly used to describe the area.

Bang Lamphu became a community prior to the Rattanakosin period. It was the residence of royalty, courtiers, vassals and citizens of many ethnic groups, including Thai, Chinese, Mon and Muslims who settled in the vicinity. Once the Khlong Rop Krung canal was excavated, a pier was established at Bang Lamphu by which goods such as vegetables and fruits could be transported from the Thonburi side. In those days, Bang Lamphu resembled a lively floating market, bustling with activity. The renowned poet Sunthorn Phu described the area in his work Nirat Phukhao Thong, written during his journey to pay homage to the Chedi Phukhao Thong (Golden Mount) in Ayutthaya, as he passed through Bang Lamphu by boat:

Thai	Transcription	English
แพประจำ จอดราย เขาขายของ มีแพรผ้า สารพัด สีม่วงตอง ทั้งสิ่งของ ขาวเหลือง เครื่องสำเภา	Pae pracham jod rai khaokhai khong Mee phraepha saraphat si muangtong Thang singkhong khaolueang krueang samphao	Rafts lined the banks where merchants called and sold With silks and cloth in soft light purple, pale and gold With goods in white and yellow, and fine silks manifold

Bang Lamphu also became a major market for overland trade via the Khaosan Road and a number of other roads.

The community was home to likay dancers and Thai musicians and was the birthplace of Montri Tramote, a Thai musician recognized as "master of Thai classical music" and National Artist of Performing arts (Thai music).

Bang Lamphu has become a popular tourist destination, especially for Westerners. The Khaosan and Rambuttri Roads feature tourist attractions. Accommodations and dining are available including guest houses, hostels, restaurants, street food, bars, cafés, clothes, and travel agencies including Thai massage services. For Thai people, Bang Lamphu is also considered to be a hub for notable school uniform stores.

Bang Lamphu, especially Sip Sam Hang Road, the area opposite Wat Bowonniwet Vihara was considered a center of teenagers in the 1950s–60s, like Wang Burapha. Since it was home to many restaurants including cafés and ice cream parlours that offered jukeboxes and televisions, which were rare appliances in those days. Hence, Bang Lamphu and Sip Sam Hang Road were cited in the 1997 Thai heroic bloodshed film Dang Bireley's and Young Gangsters as a backdrop for the characters in street gang battles.

== Surrounding places ==
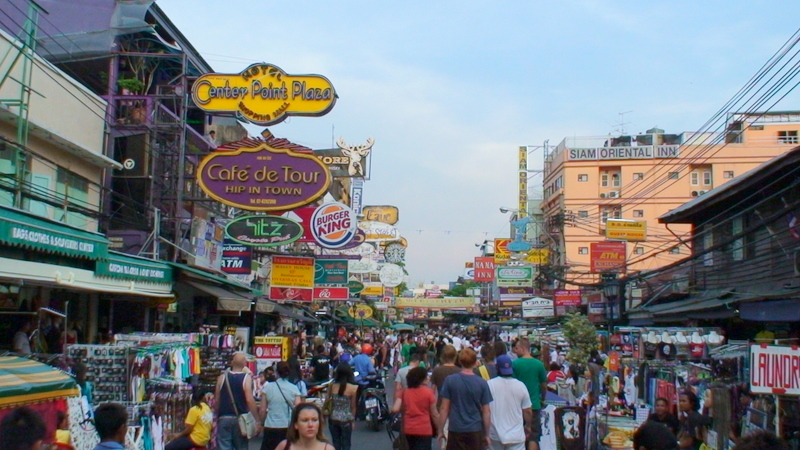
Khaosan Road in daytime

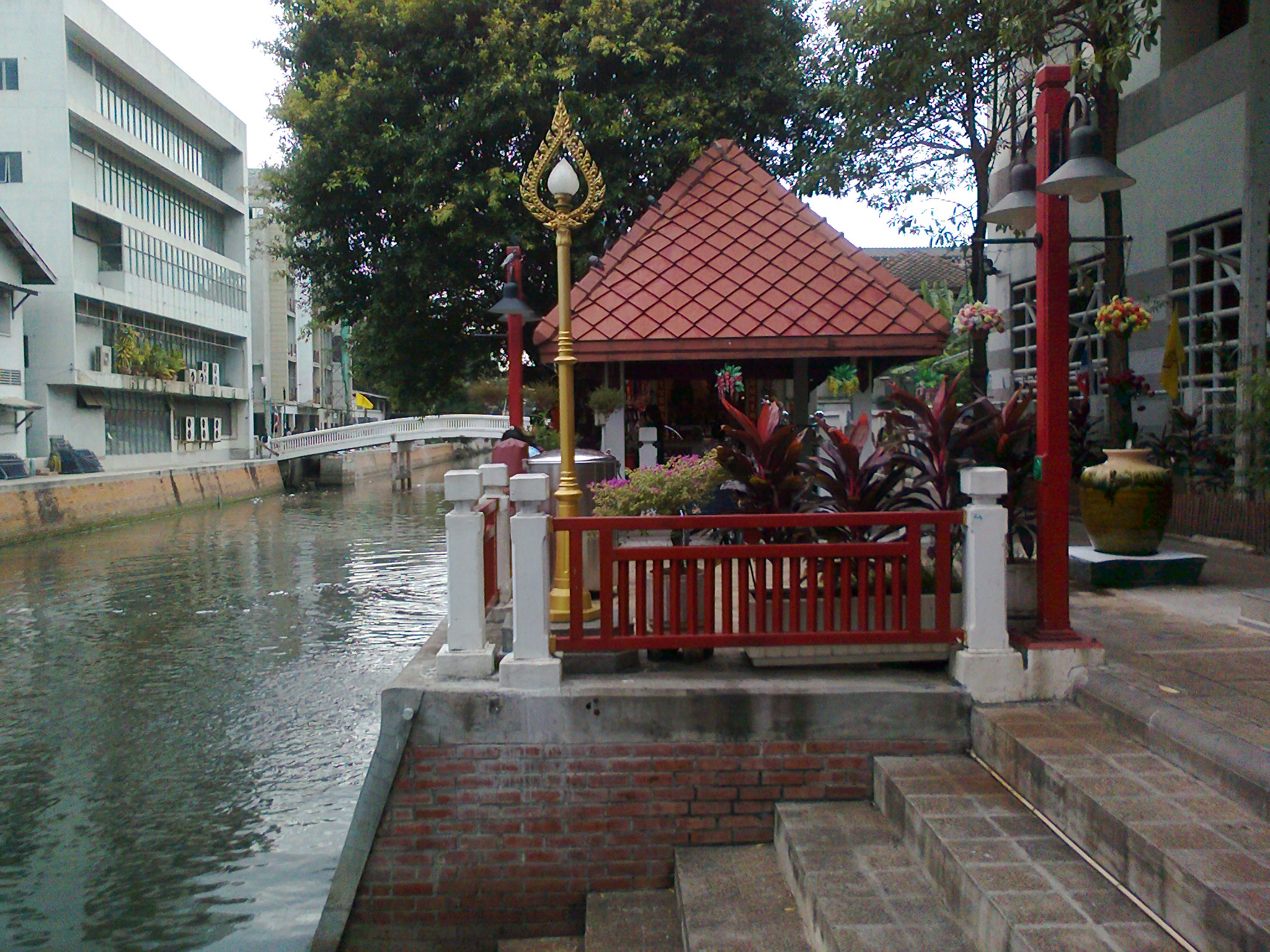
King Taksin Shrine by the Khlong Bang Lamphu

- Wat Bowonniwet Vihara
- Wat Chana Songkhram
- Santi Chai Prakan Park
- Phra Sumen Fort
- Palace Gate Remnants
- Pipit Banglamphu Museum
- Khuru Sapha Print Shop
- Maliwan Palace (now the office of FAO)
- Phra Athit Palace (now the head office of Manager Daily)
- Chao Phraya Palace (now the head office of Manager Daily like Phra Athit Palace)
- Wat Sangwet Witsayaram
- Hong Uthit Bridge
- Duriya Praneet Foundation
- Wan Chart Bridge
- Sor Vorapin Muaythai and Boxing Gym (now closed)
- New World Department Store (famous as "Fish Sanctum" in Bangkok, now closed)
- Tang Hua Seng Department Store, it will close for good on the morning of September 10, 2024.
- Bangkok Cooperative Bang Lamphu
- Masjid Chakkaphong
- Masjid Ban Tuk Din
- Norarat Sathan Bridge
- Chao Por Nu Joss House
- King Taksin Shrine (the only King Taksin shrine in Phra Nakhon side)
- BMA Local Museum Phra Nakhon District
- Wat Trithotsathep
- Ban Phan Thom (the last community of silversmith in Bangkok)
- Chana Songkhram Metropolitan Police Station
- Coin Museum
- National Gallery
