= New World Department Store =

New World Department Store may refer to:

- New World Department Store (Bangkok)
- New World Department Store China
