= Santichaiprakarn Park =

Park in Bangkok, Thailand

Coordinates: 13°45′49.58″N 100°29′45.91″E

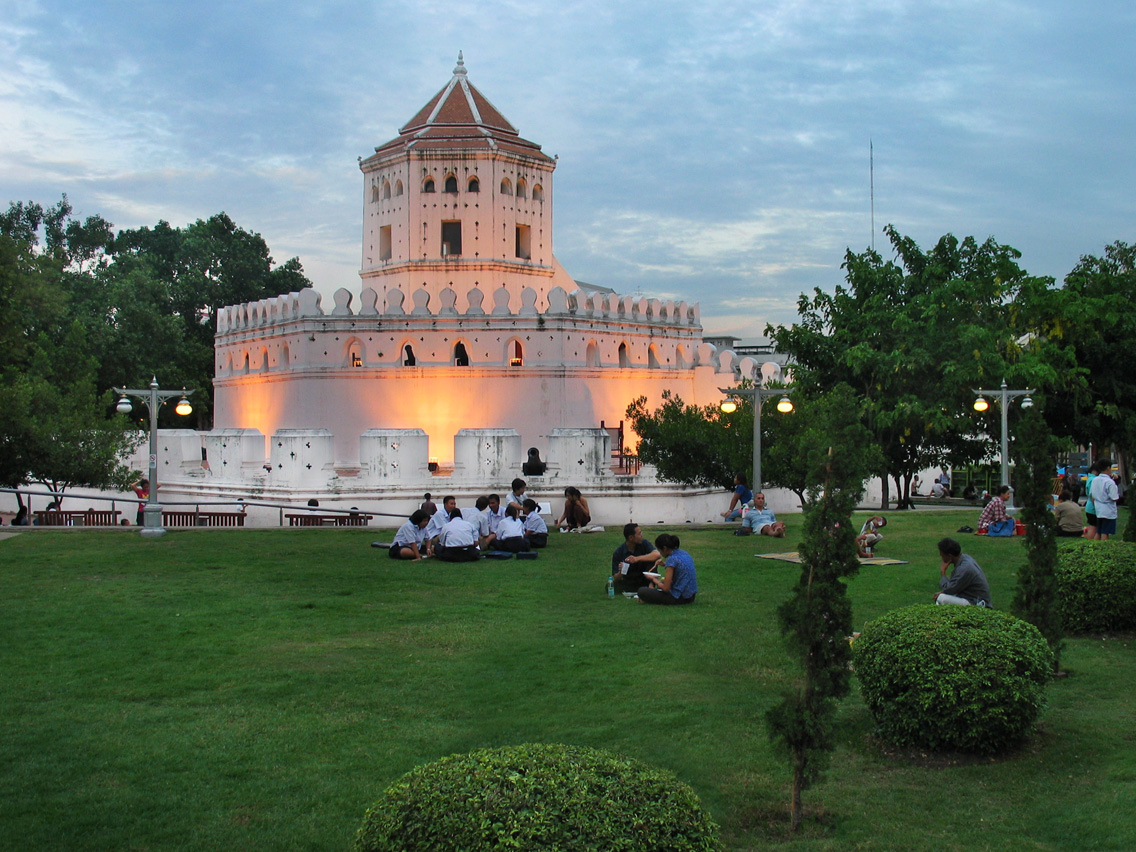
- Phra Sumen Fort seen from the park
- Interactive map of Santichaiprakarn Park
- Type: Public park
- Location: Phra Athit Road, Chana Songkram Subdistrict, Phra Nakhon District, Bangkok
- Area: 3 acres (1.2 ha)
- Created: 1999
- Operator: Bangkok Metropolitan Administration (BMA)
- Status: open year round 05.00 a.m.–09.00 p.m.

Santichaiprakarn Park (Thai: สวนสันติชัยปราการ, RTGS: Suan Santi Chai Prakan, pronounced [sǔan sǎn.tìʔ t͡ɕʰāj prāː.kāːn]) is a small urban park by the Chao Phraya River within the grounds of Phra Sumen Fort on Phra Athit Road. Overlooking the river, the park is set in an ancient area of the city and has a long history of its own. Shaded by a mix of small and large trees, it serves as a venue for many events and activities such as aerobics, Tai chi dance, chain spinning, and juggling. In the evenings, both local residents and travelers staying near Khaosan Road enjoy spending time here.

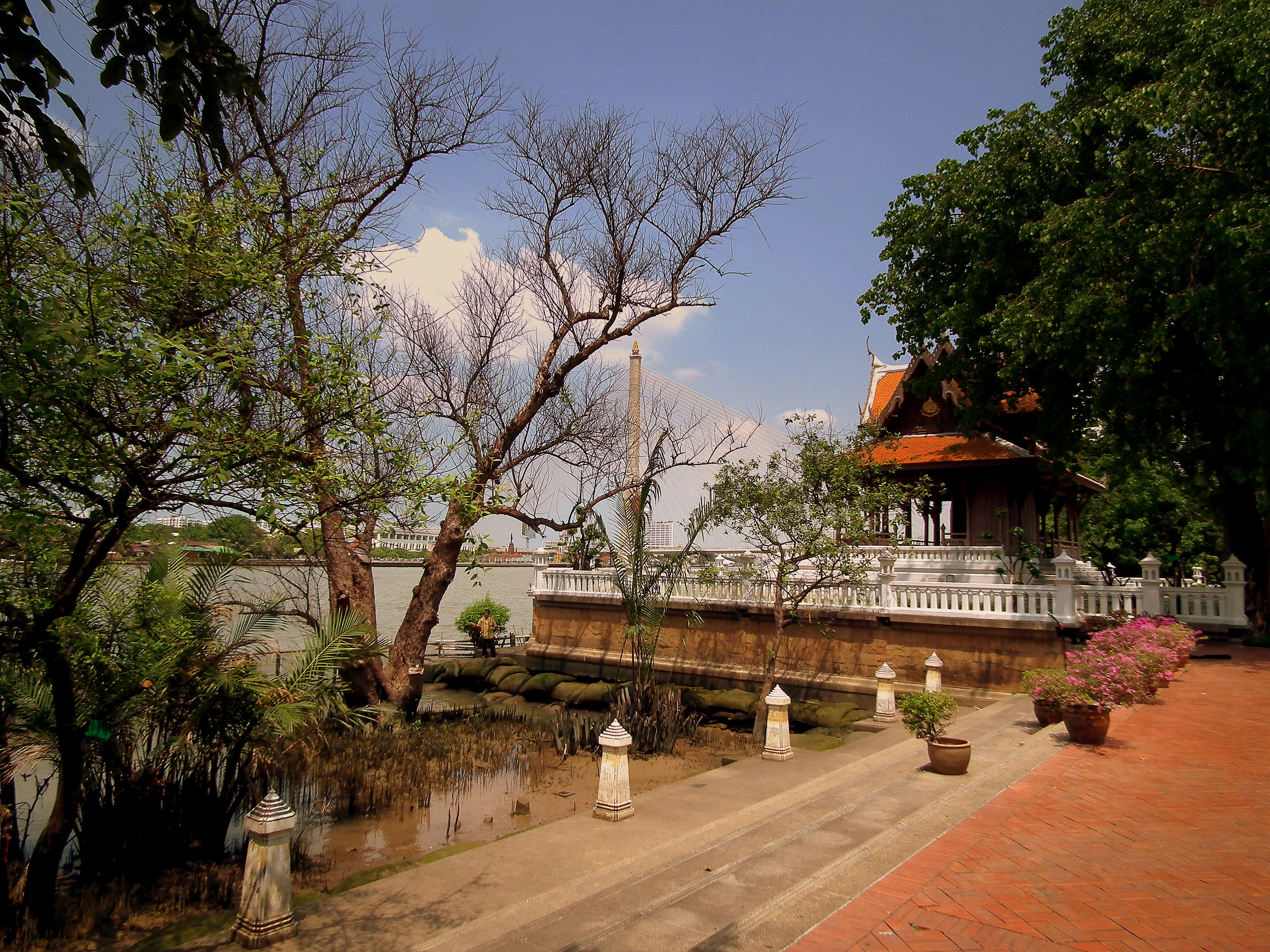
The last lamphu (mangrove apple) of Bangkok within Santichaiprakarn Park on the Chao Phraya River

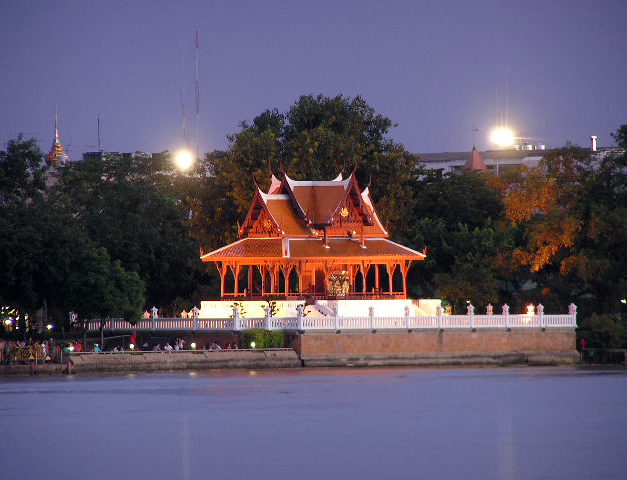
Santichaiprakarn Pavilion

Apart from its leisure activities, Santichaiprakarn Park also serves as a venue for local and government events, such as welcome ceremonies and cultural activities like the Loy Krathong Ceremony and the Songkran Festival. During the religious ceremony of presenting robes to Buddhist monks, visitors can come to the park to view the Royal Barge Procession.

Of note in the park is the Santichaiprakarn Pavilion, built to commemorate King Bhumibol Adulyadej's (Rama IX) 60th birthday. The name of the park itself, also bestowed by King Bhumibol, means "the fortress of victory for peace", and was given in 1999, on the occasion of His Majesty's 72nd birthday, when Phra Sumen Fort and its surrounding grounds were developed into a public park. The royal pier and royal boat were created for traditional ceremonies along the Chao Phraya River. There is also a lamphu tree (Sonneratia caseolaris) in the park, which is in fact the source of the name of the surrounding district – Bang Lamphu. It is said to be the last one in Bangkok.
