= Thonburi Palace =

Former royal palace in Thailand

Coordinates: 13°44′33″N 100°29′24″E

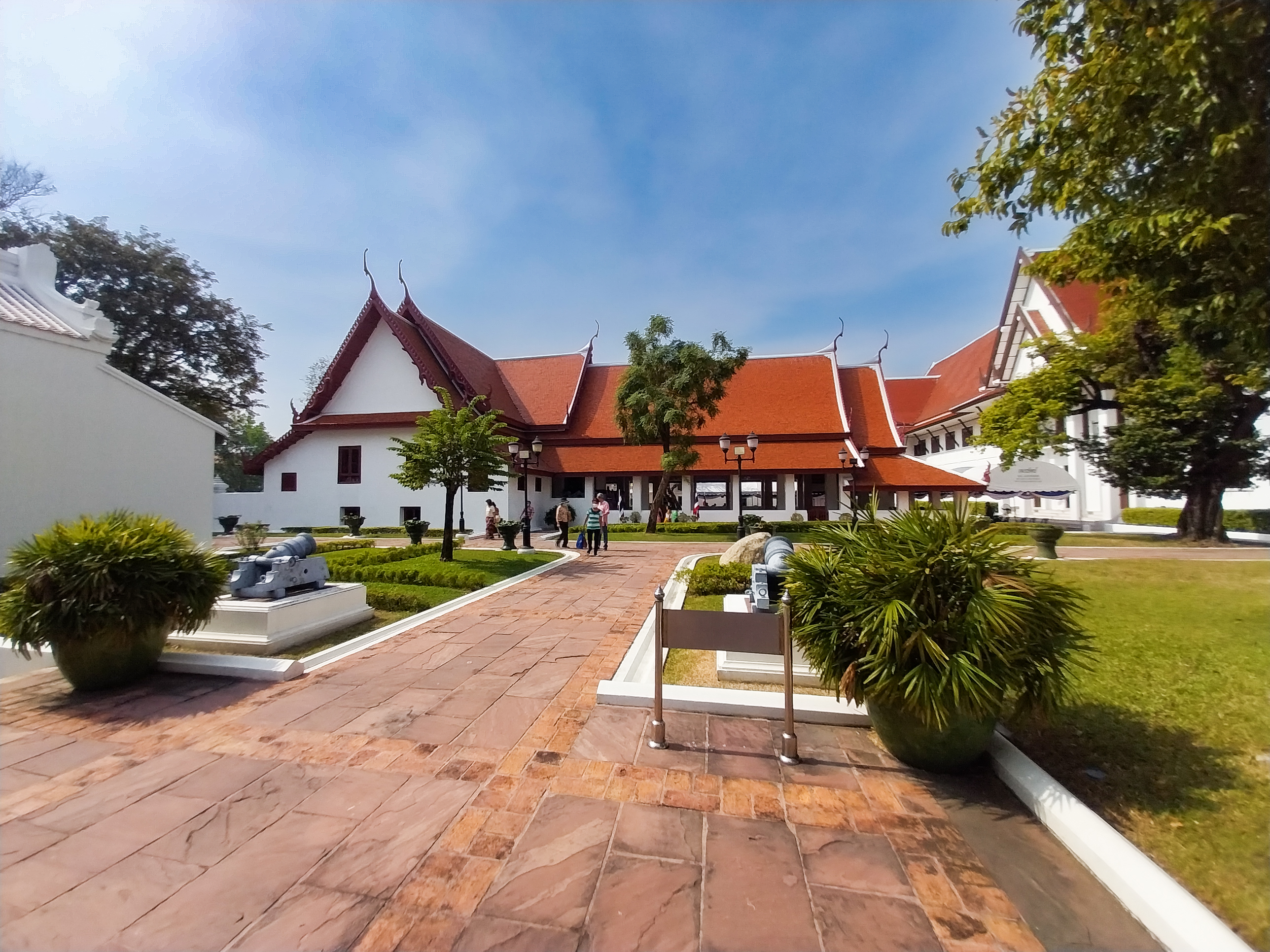
Thonburi Palace

Thonburi Palace, also known in Thai as Phra Racha Wang Derm (Thai: พระราชวังเดิม, RTGS: Phraratchawang Doem, literally former palace), is the former royal palace of King Taksin, who ruled the Siamese (Thai) kingdom of Thonburi following the fall of Ayutthaya in 1767 and up until the establishment of Rattanakosin in 1782. It later served as the residence of several high-ranking members of the Chakri dynasty until 1900 when the palace became the site of the Royal Thai Naval Academy. The palace is now within the grounds of the Royal Thai Navy headquarters in Bangkok, and is open for group visits pending advance appointment.

== History ==
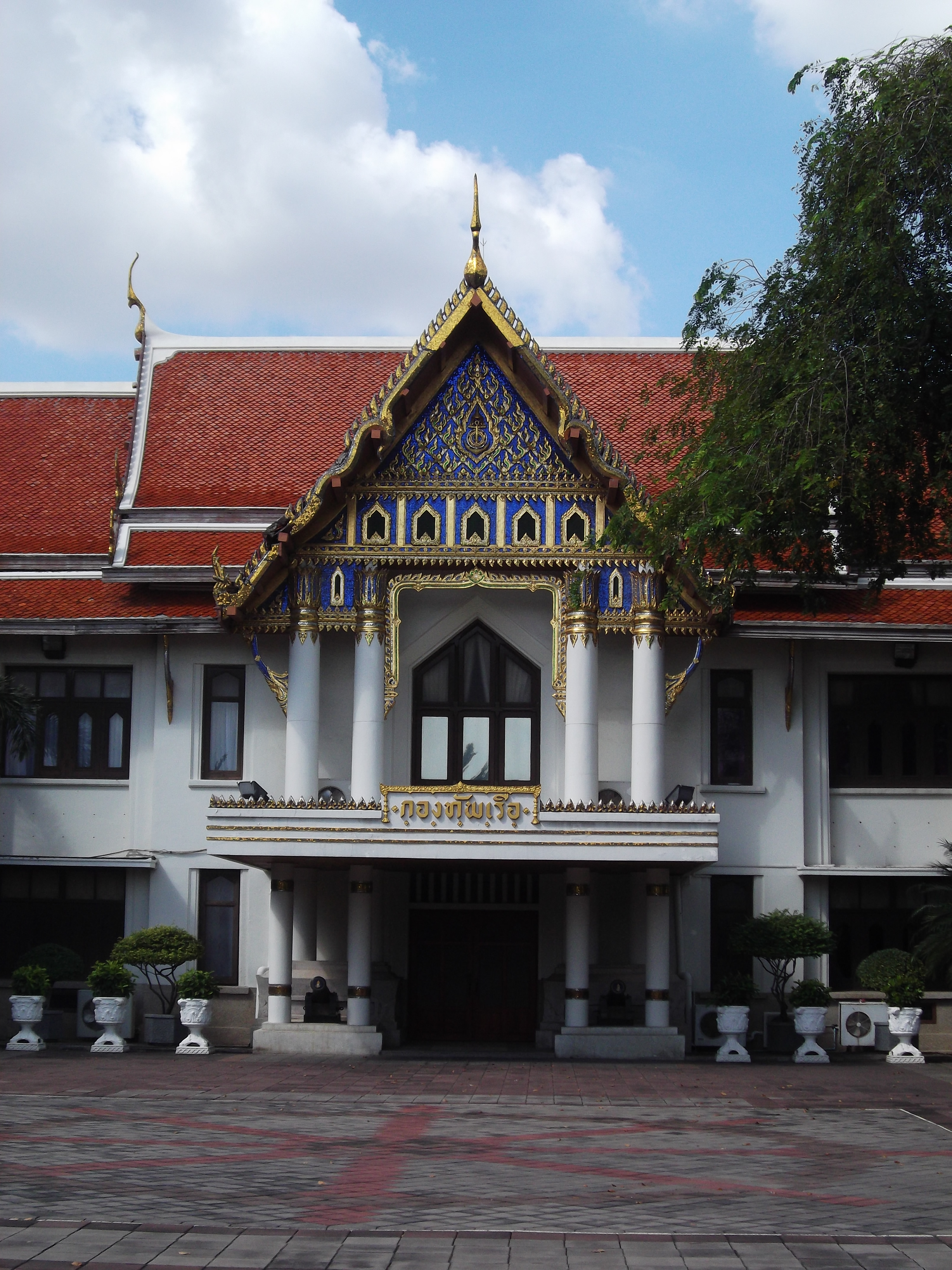
Thonburi Palace, located in Bangkok Yai district, Bangkok, was originally the royal residence of King Taksin the Great and is currently under the control of the Royal Thai Navy.

Following the fall of Ayutthaya in 1767 and subsequent Burmese withdrawal, the military leader Phraya Tak succeeded in reclaiming the cities of Ayutthaya and Thonburi (also known as Bangkok). He then established himself as king (later known as Taksin) and made Thonburi his new capital. He had a royal palace built within the old city walls, near the Wichayen Fort (which was renamed Wichai Prasit) on the western bank of the Chao Phraya River. The palace lay to the south of Wat Chaeng (now Wat Arun) and northeast of Wat Thai Talat (Wat Molilokkayaram), both Buddhist temples which were included within the palace grounds.

Taksin's reign ended in 1782 when he was overthrown by the general Chao Phraya Chakri, who became king (later known as Phutthayotfa Chulalok). Phutthayotfa Chulalok relocated the capital city proper to the eastern bank of the Chao Phraya (Rattanakosin) and had a new royal palace, the Grand Palace, built there. Taksin's palace then became known as Phra Racha Wang Derm, or former palace, and the two royal temples were excluded from the palace grounds.

As Thonburi was still strategically important, guarding Rattanakosin against invasions from the west, the king would place important royal family members, mostly their sons or brothers, at the palace. This tradition continued until the death of Prince Chaturonrasmi in 1900. King Chulalongkorn subsequently granted ownership of the palace to the Royal Thai Navy, and the palace became the site of the Royal Thai Naval Academy until its relocation in 1944. The palace is now within the grounds of the Royal Thai Navy headquarters and is jointly managed by the Phra Racha Wang Derm Restoration Foundation.

In contrast with the Grand Palace, Phra Racha Wang Derm is much smaller and simpler in its construction. Apart from the older Wichai Prasit Fort, the only original building from the Thonburi period is the Throne Hall, a Thai-style building consisting of two segments forming a T shape. Later additions include two Chinese-style residences, King Pinklao's residence, King Taksin's shrine, the Whale Head Shrine, and the (literal) Green House.

== Gallery ==
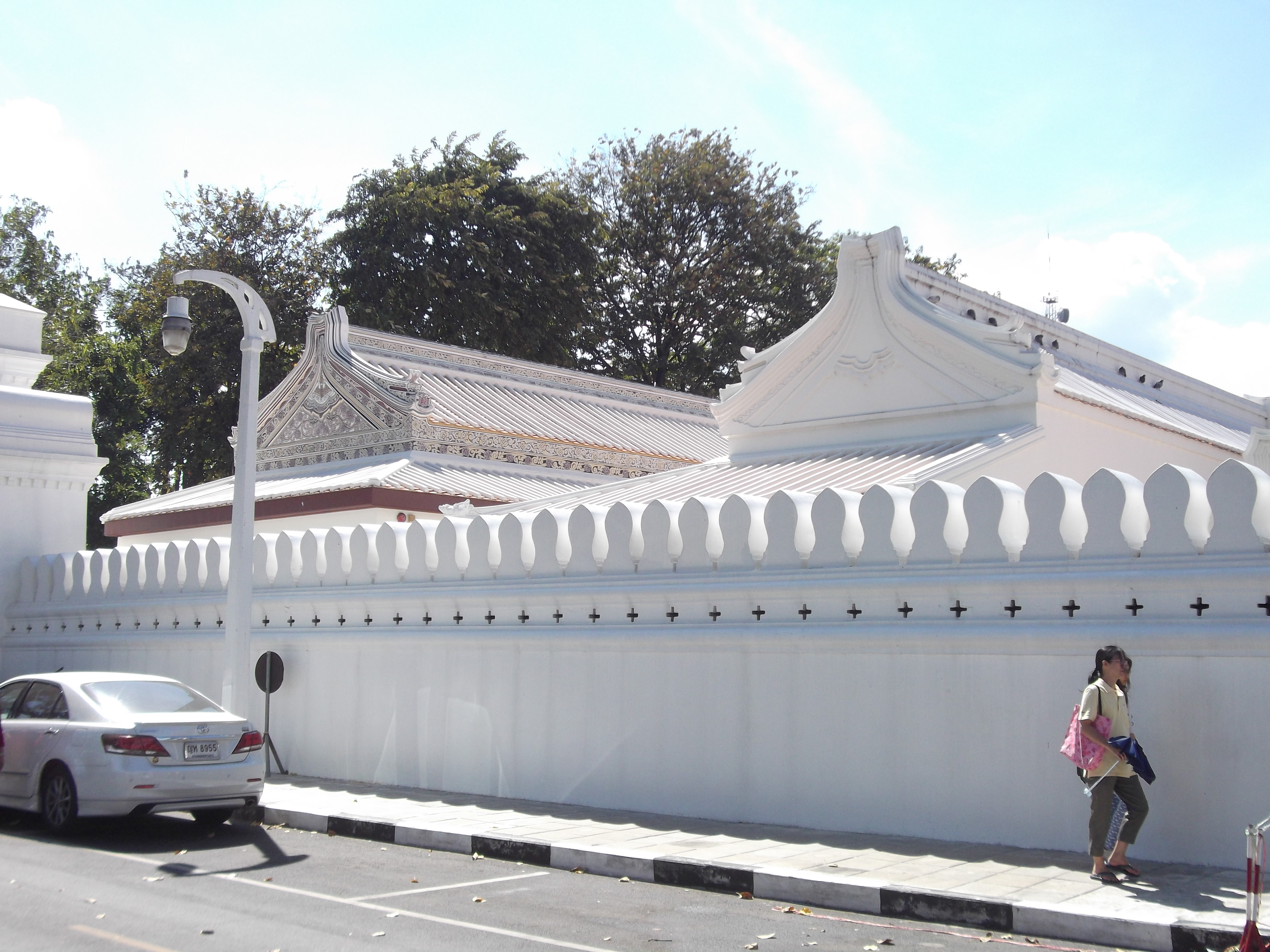

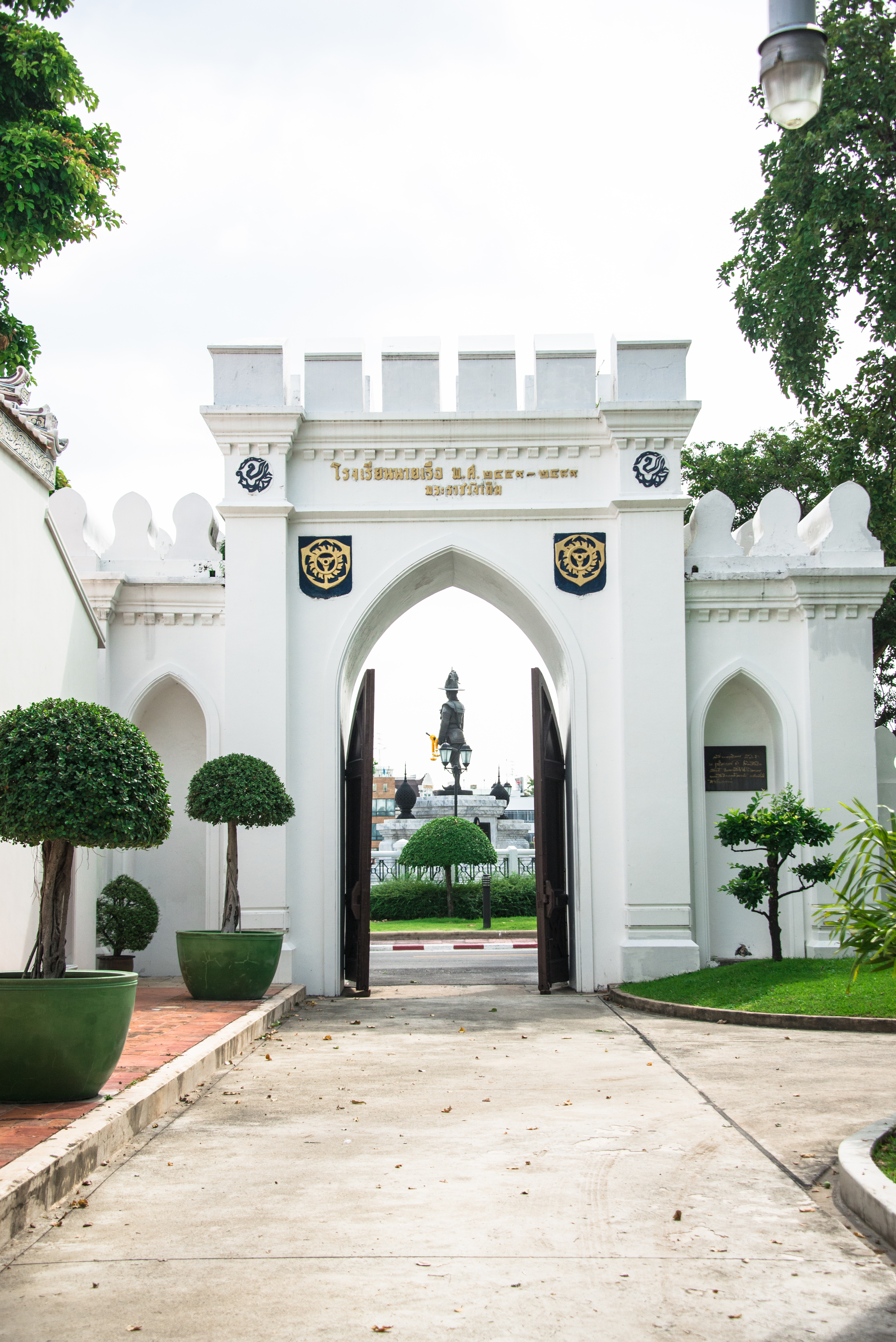

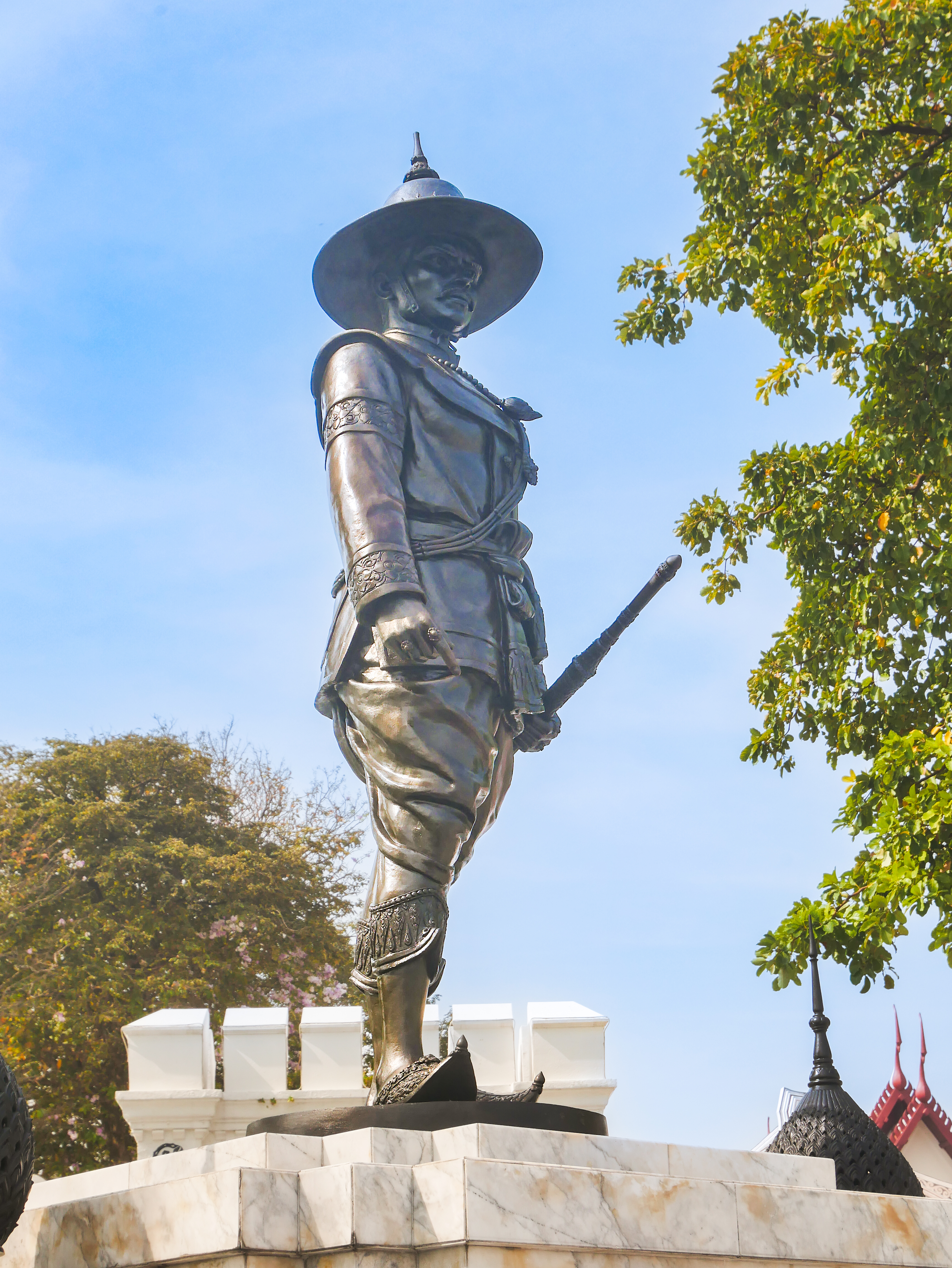

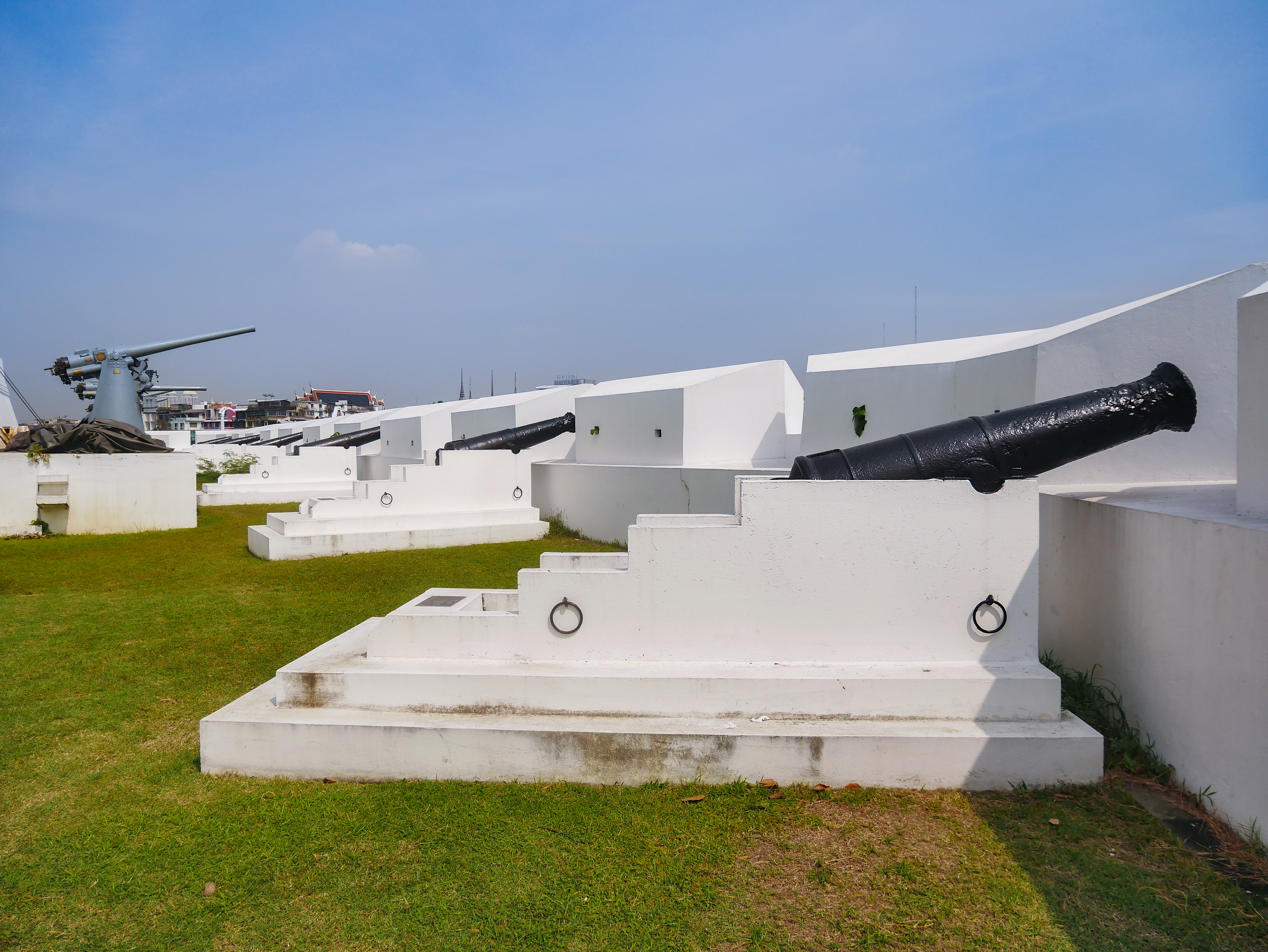

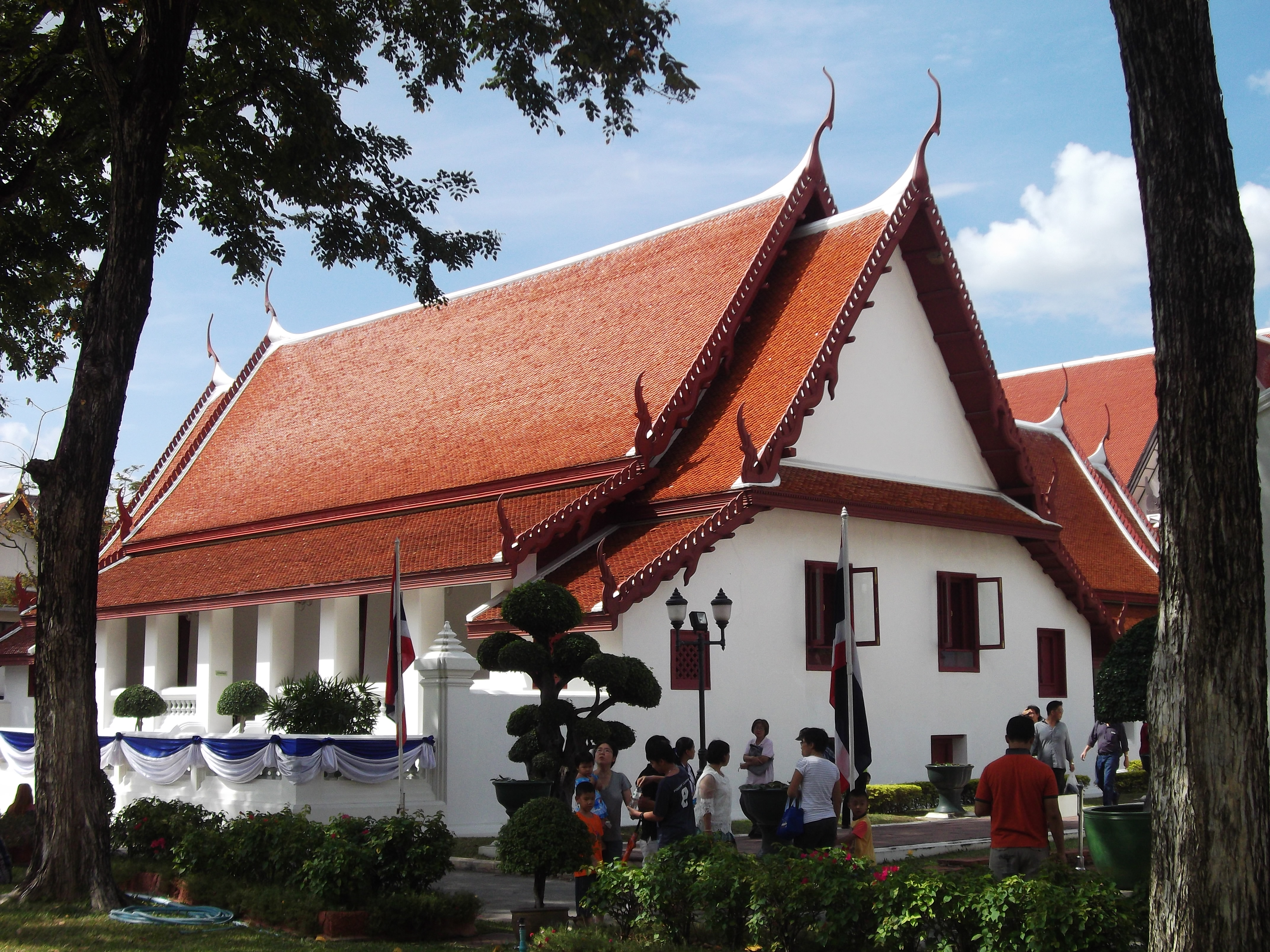

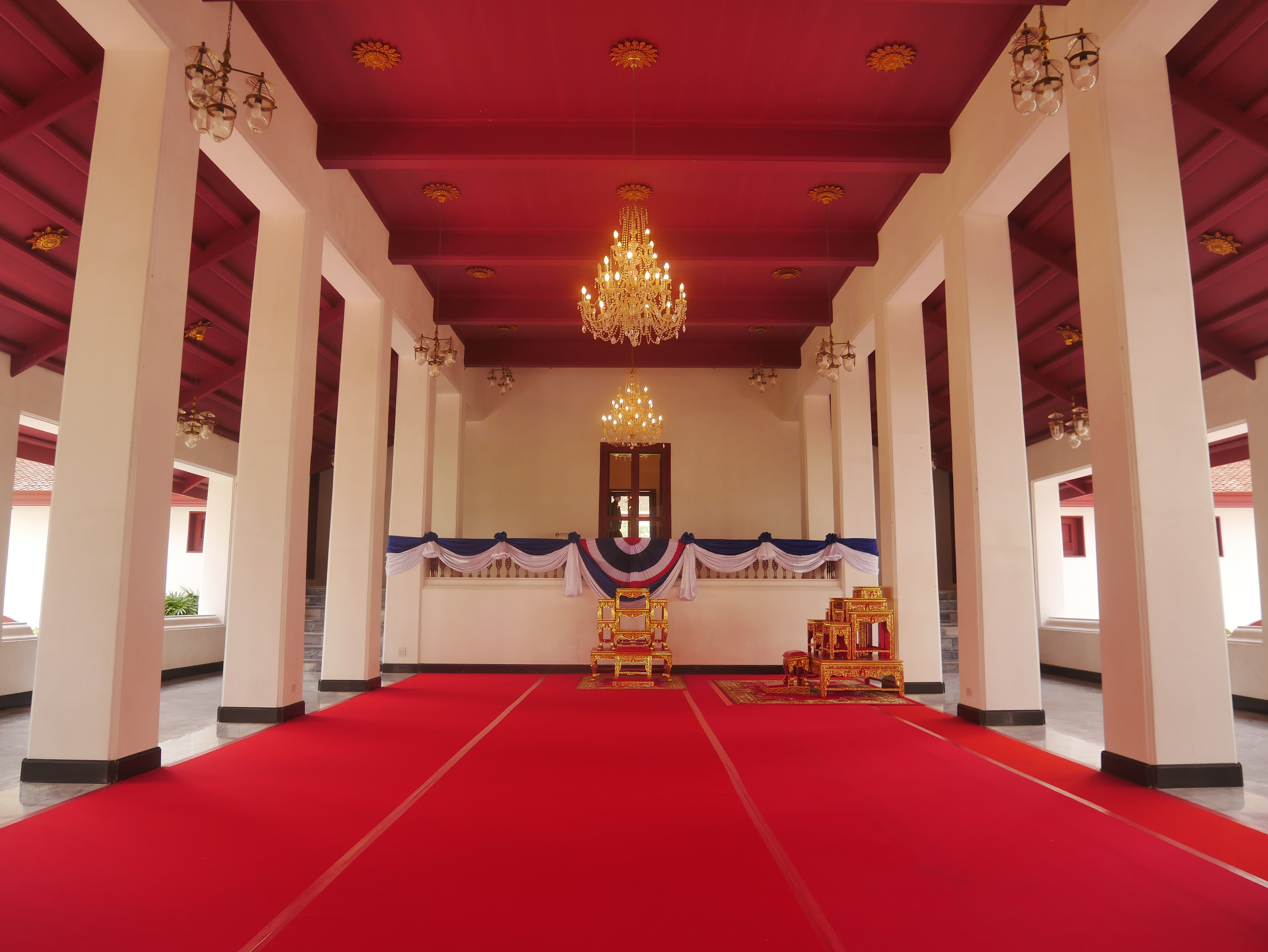

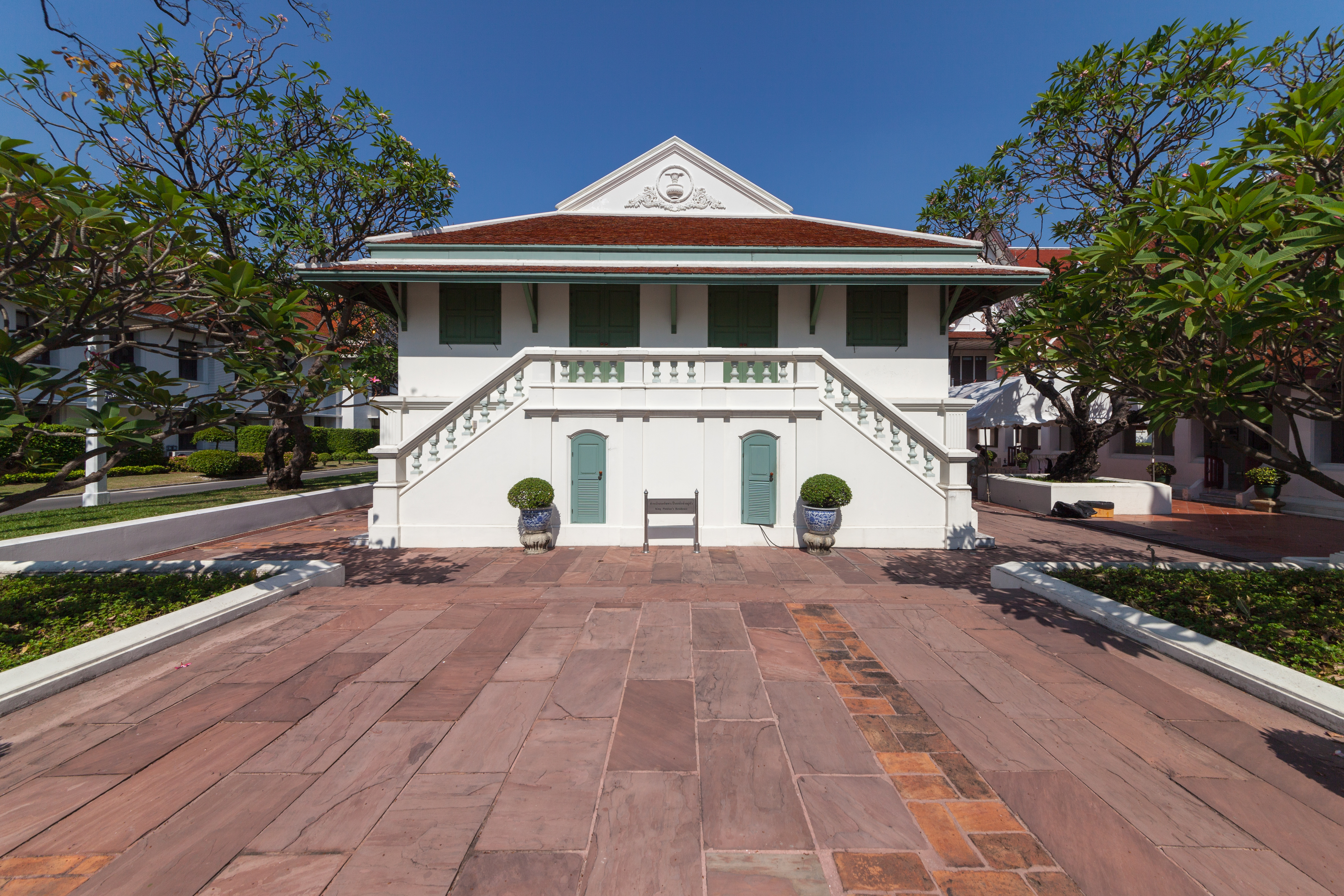

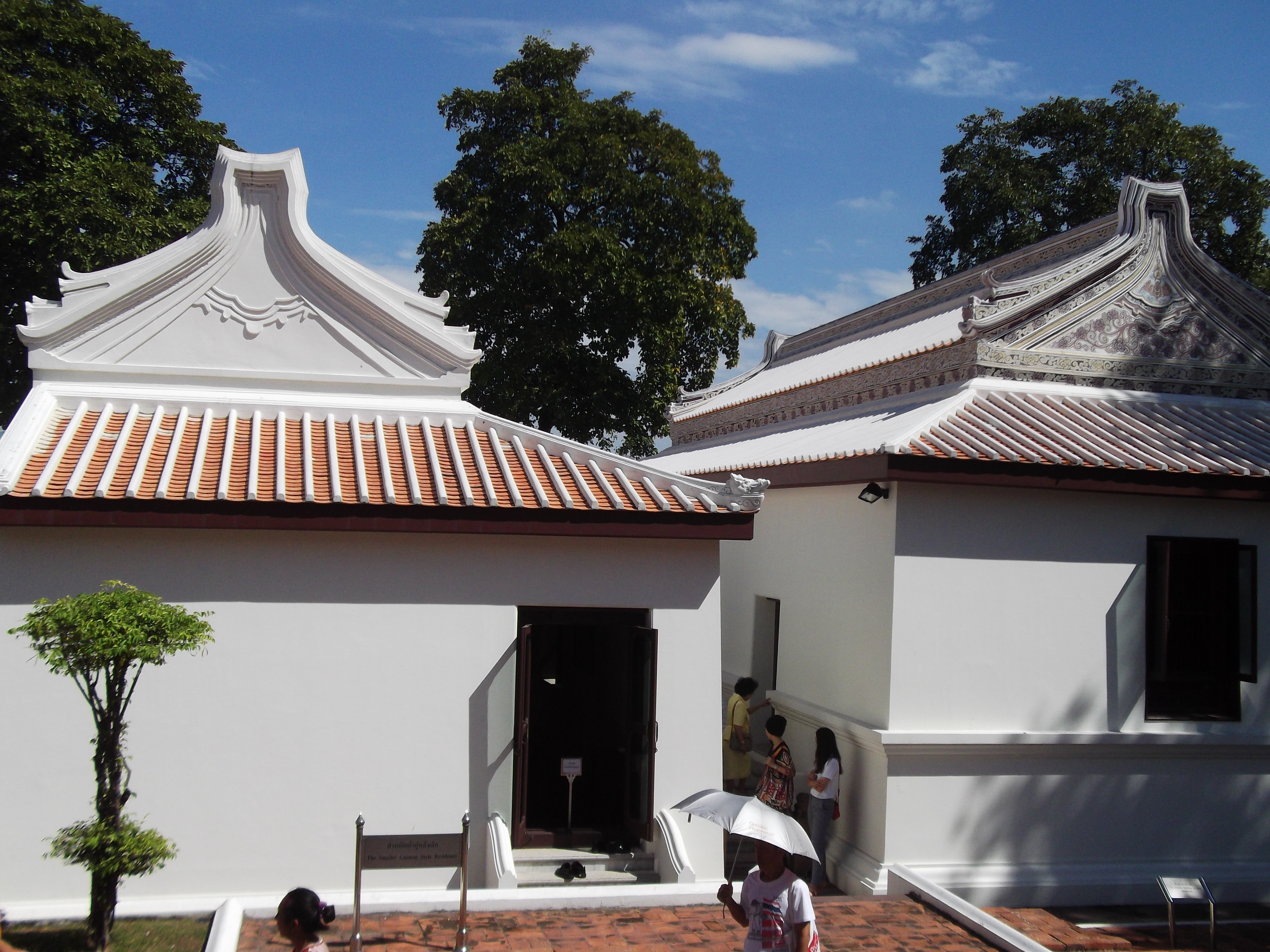

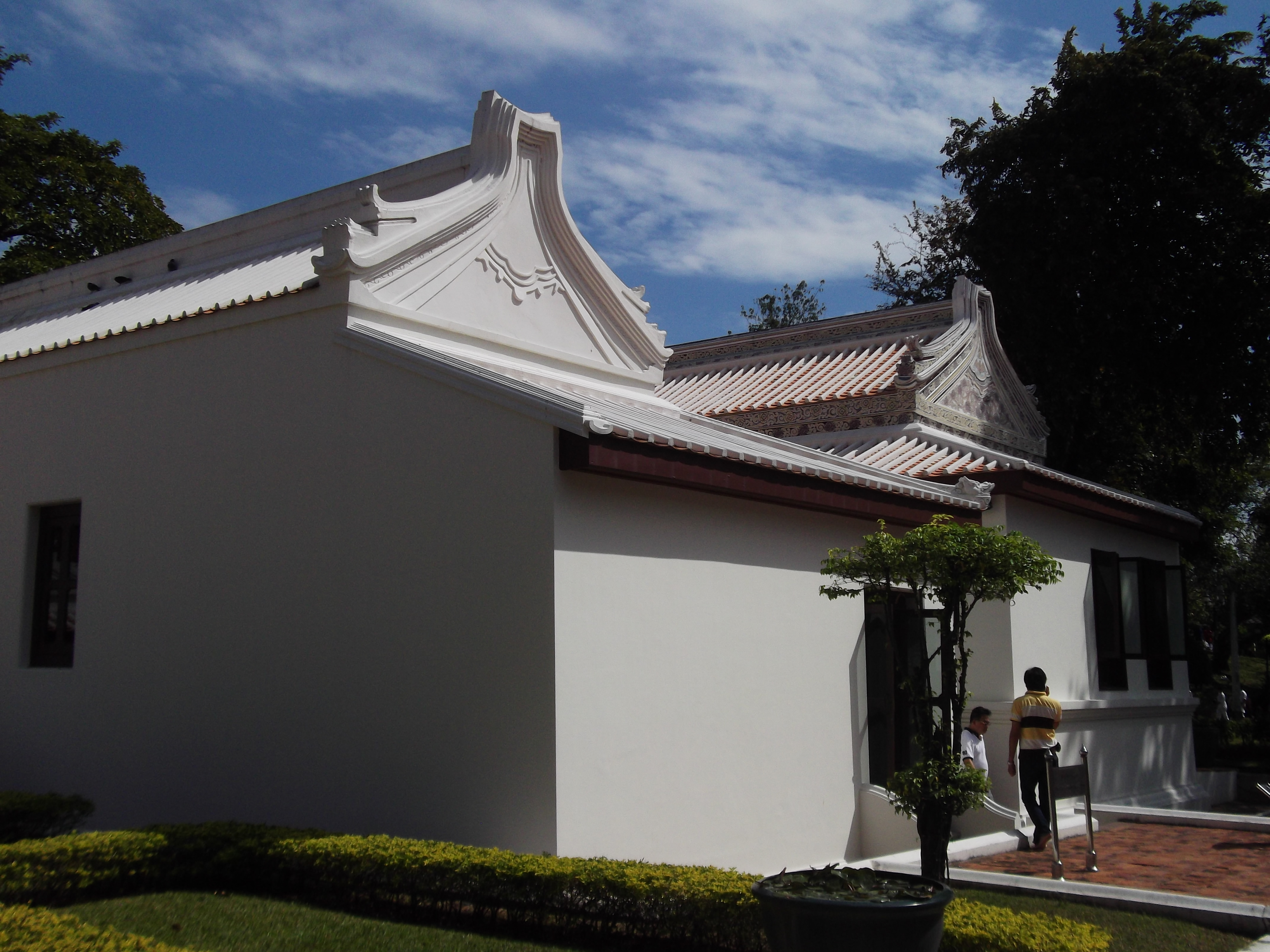

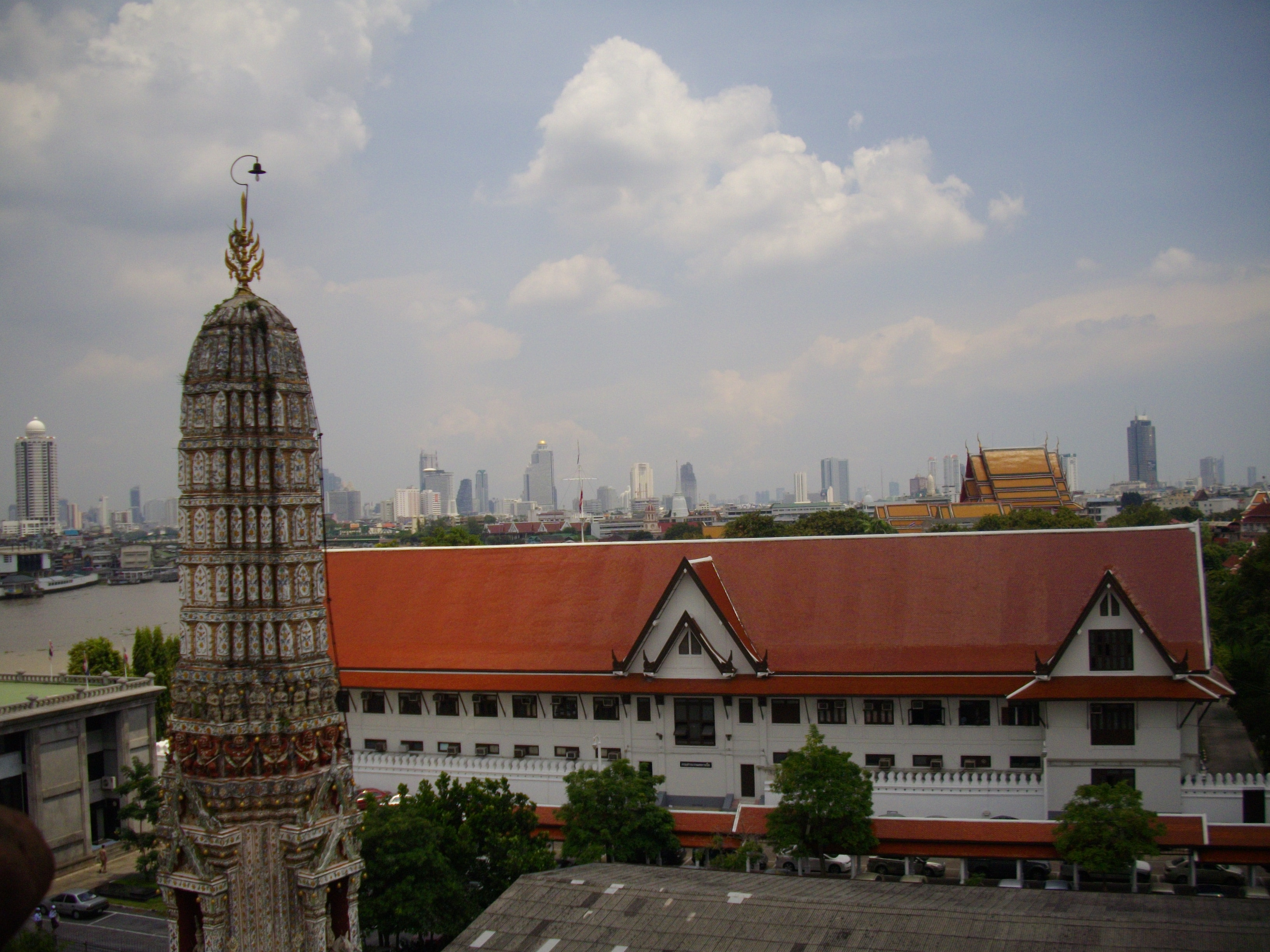

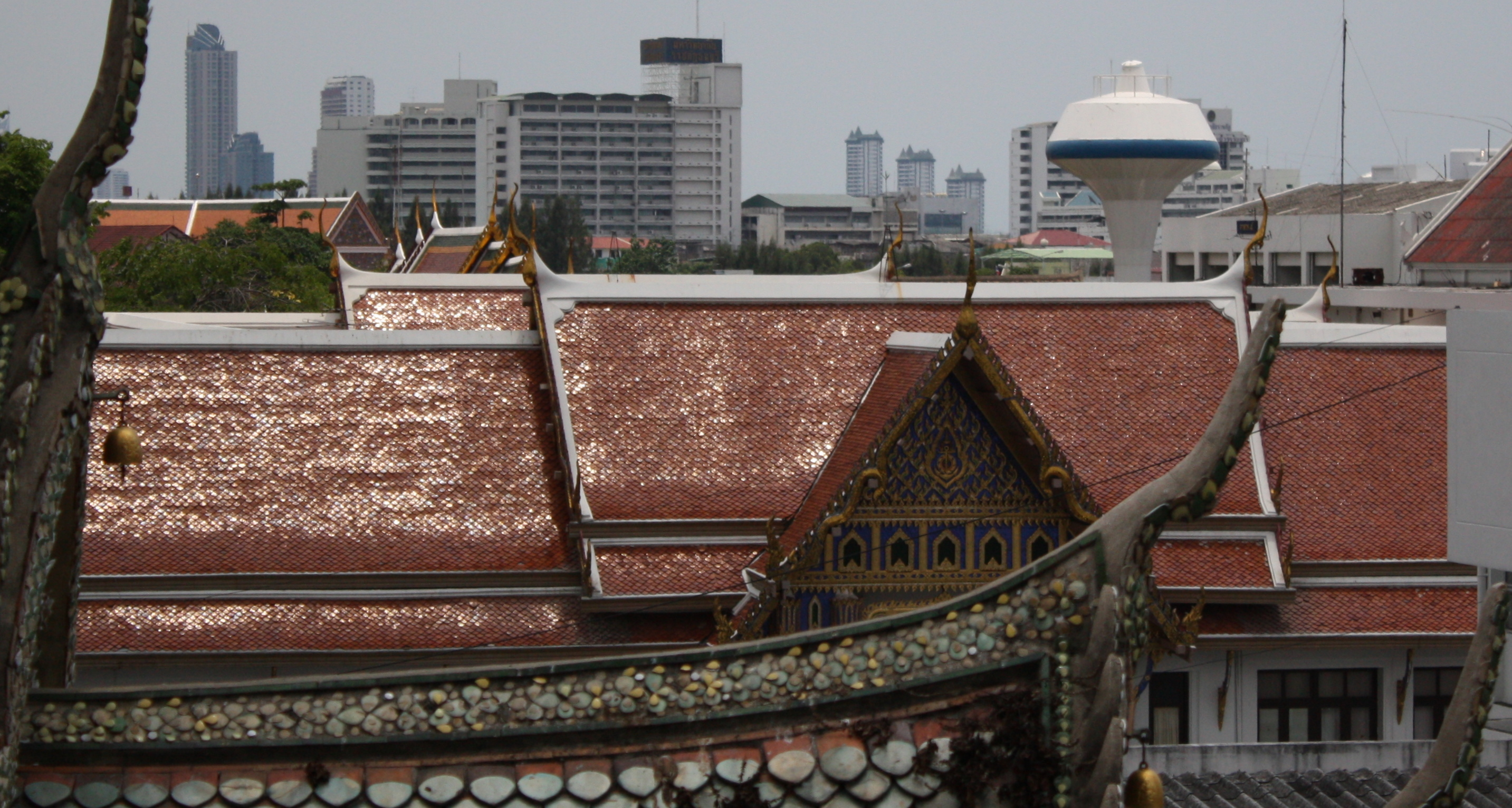

== See also ==
- History of Bangkok
