= Phra Athit Road =

Road in Bangkok, Thailand

Coordinates: 13.760292°N 100.500432°E

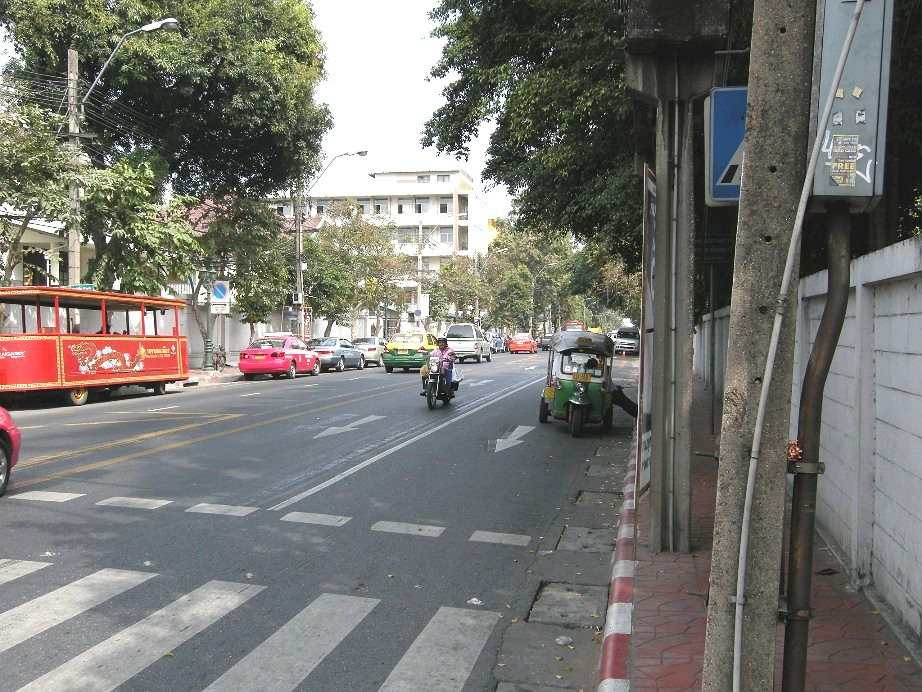
The beginning of Phra Athit Road

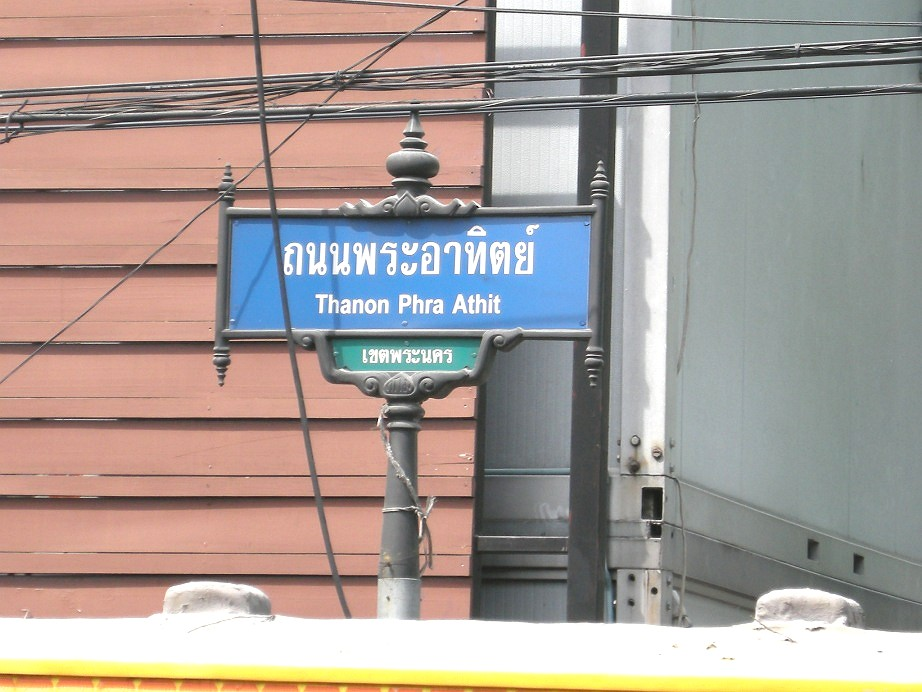
Sign of road

Phra Athit Road (Thai: ถนนพระอาทิตย์, RTGS: Thanon Phra Athit, pronounced [tʰā.nǒn pʰráʔ ʔāː.tʰít], lit. 'Sun Road') is a short street, 770 m (2,526.2 ft) long along Chao Phraya River to the northeast. Back in the past this road was full with important buildings such as houses of nobility and mansions as residence of ambassadors from other countries. Now there are Office of the Council of State, Buddhist Association of Thailand, Food Agriculture Organization (FAO), UNICEF of Thailand located on this road. It is surrounded by river piers, and a riverside park with the ancient for called Phra Arthit Fort or Phra Sumen Fort. At night this road is popular for many restaurants and bars with live music such as pop, rock, and jazz for tourists and local people.

== History ==
Phra Arthit Road has a history of more than 200 years old since the establishment of Bangkok in King Rama I Era. Still, the road was actually built in the reign of King Rama V. It has been the center of government, art, and culture of Thai people. It is lined along Chao Phraya River starting from Thammasat University’s gate at Phra Arthit gate to Phra Sumen Fort. Along both sides of the road, there are mansions which were built during the reign of King Rama III, with architectural influences from China and Europe. This road becomes popular among tourists due to historical culture which reflects the tradition of Thailand. Also this road is connected to Khao san Road which is a landmark among tourists, and also very popular about street food.

== Important places ==
There are historical building such as Baan Chao Phraya used to be a nobility house of Phra Pinklao. Later in King Rama V reign, it was bought and used as the police department but King Rama VI granted this property to be a house of nobility once again.

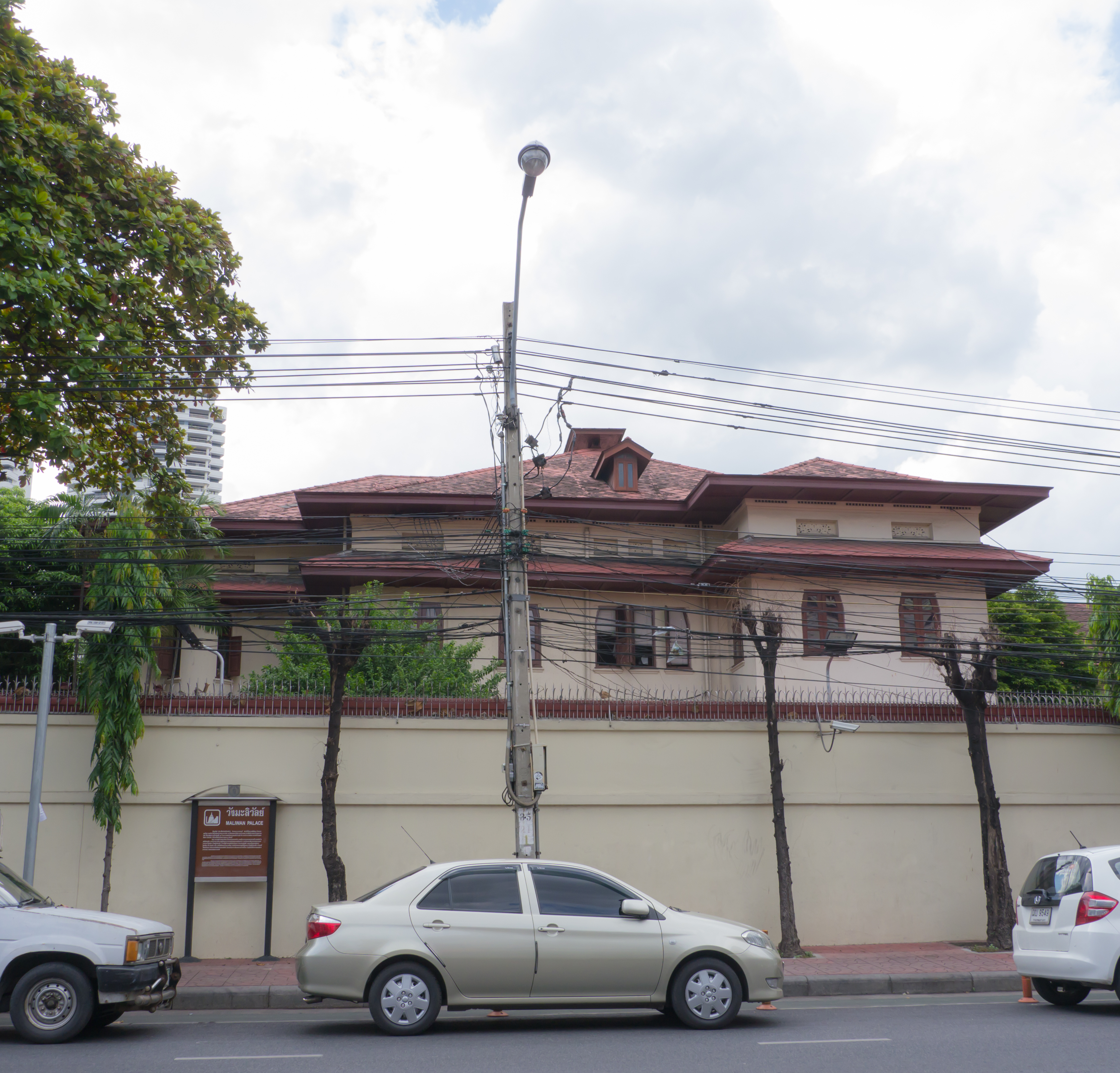
Baan Ma-li wan

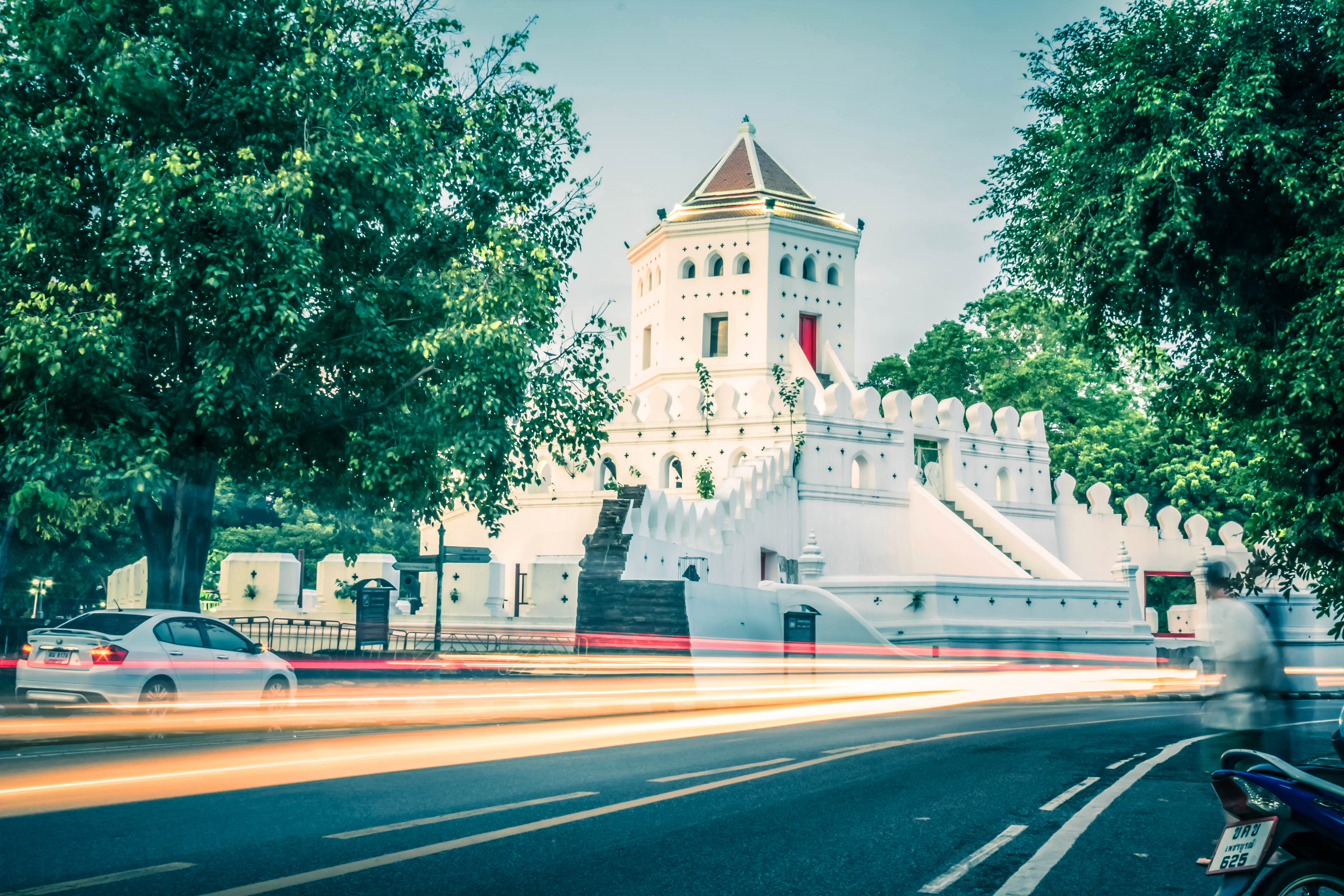
Phra Sumen Fort at dusk

=== Ban Phra Athit ===
–It is a palace built in King Rama I era. Formerly, it was rented by Goethe Institute to use as a meeting place for those people interested in literature, film, and arts. Currently, it is the office of Manager Media Group.

=== Baan Chao Phraya ===
–Originally, it was the palace of Prince Sathit Thamroungsawat, son of King Rama II. Later on, King Rama V bought it to build the police department's office. Later on, it was Prince Khamrob's palace.

=== Baan Ma-li wan ===
–Baan Ma-li wan was built by Ercole Manfredi who was an Italian architect. Originally, it was the palace of Prince Nares Varariddhi, son of King Rama IV. Today it is UN Food and Agriculture Organization's bureau.

=== Phra Sumen Fort ===
–Phra Arthit Fort or Phra Sumen Fort was built in 1783 A.D. or 2326 B.E. in the reign of King Rama I. It is only one of fourteen forts left today. The purpose of building this fort is for protecting the city from the enemies. During that time, the king decided to build a number of fortifications to protect Bangkok. As time passed by, many forts were dismantled due to an unnecessity in use. Phra Sumen Fort is one of the two remaining forts today. The real cannons are still available for visitors. Also, on the top floor, there is a museum which displays an items found in the fort in before its renovation. Today this fort becomes the iconic of Phra Arthit road for a historical place to visit.

=== Santi Chai Prakan Park ===
–Phra Sumen Fort is located here. It overlooks the views of the river and the modern Rama VIII Bridge in the distance.
