= New World Department Store (Bangkok) =

Former shopping centre and department store in Bangkok, Thailand

Coordinates: 13°45′42″N 100°29′54″E

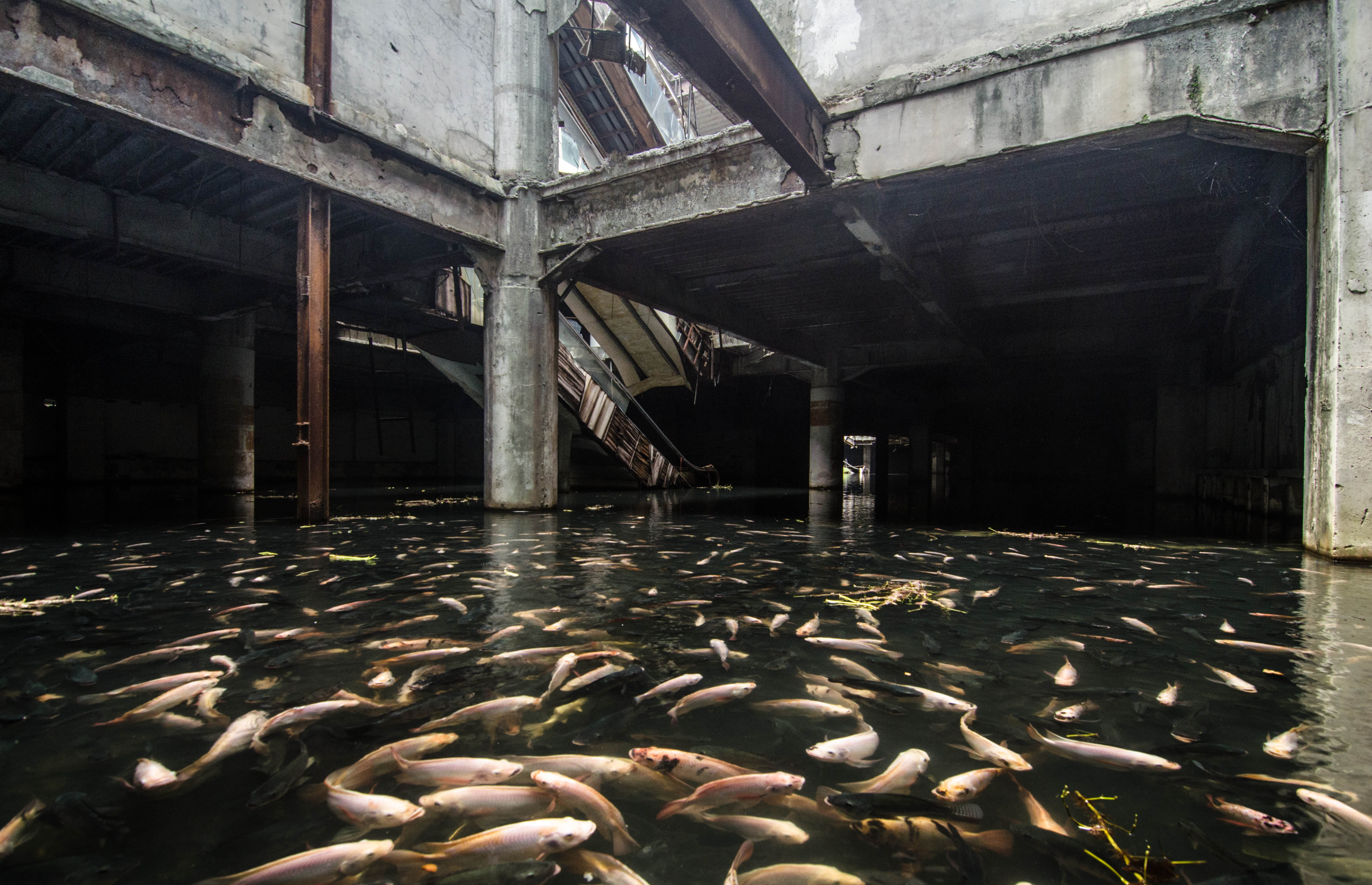
The flooded interior in 2012, with numerous fish. This photograph is part of a set that went viral in 2014, drawing international attention.

New World Department Store is a former shopping centre and department store in Bangkok, Thailand. It stood on the corner of Bang Lamphu Intersection and operated from 1983 until 2004, when the building partially collapsed during a long-delayed court-ordered demolition of illegally built floors, killing one person. The remaining structure has since largely remained abandoned, and drew interest as an urban exploration destination in the 2010s for a fish pond that had been created inside, before authorities removed the fish in 2015. From 2020, the building has been used for exhibitions concerning the use of urban public space.

== History ==
New World Department Store was opened in 1983 by Kaew Fah Shopping Arcade (aka Kaew Far Shopping Co., Ltd.), a company owned by local business developer Kaew Pooktuanthong. (Note: Kaew had also recently developed the nearby Kaewfah Plaza shopping centre. This building was destroyed in a fire on 18 March 1999, which killed five of Kaew's family members. Some international news outlets reporting in 2014 on New World's fish pond (see further down) erroneously described the fire as happening at New World.) It was developed on land leased from Prince Bhanubandhu Yugala on the southern corner of Bang Lamphu Intersection, in the eponymous neighbourhood of Bang Lamphu, one of Bangkok's historic commercial centres. New World was among an emerging new generation of integrated department stores and shopping centres that became popular in Bangkok in the 1980s, counting among its contemporaries Pata, Merry Kings, as well as early branches of Central and The Mall. Business was initially good, and the owners opened secondary locations at Rattanathibet Road in Nonthaburi and in Saraburi (both of which have since closed down).

The building was planned and constructed with eleven floors, though it had only received building permission for a four-storey structure. Construction began in 1982, and continued after the mall opened, even as the Bangkok Metropolitan Administration (BMA) denied its request for additional approval in 1984. In 1985, the BMA filed a suit against the company for violating building codes, but the case dragged on for years while the mall continued to operate, and even after the Supreme Court ordered the demolition of the unapproved floors in 1994, the owners delayed such action until the BMA sought to enforce the order in 2002. Further wrangling over demolition costs delayed action until work finally began at the end of 2003, all while shops remained open on the lower floors.

On 2 June 2004, part of the building's eighth floor—where rubble from the demolition work had been piled—suddenly collapsed, and the falling debris severely injured two people on the first (ground) floor, one of whom died in hospital. The mall was permanently closed down afterwards. Demolition work resumed in 2005, leaving the remaining structure of the first four levels mostly intact.

== Later interest ==
With the upper floors of the building removed and the roof left unreplaced, the bottom floor became flooded with rainwater and became a breeding ground for mosquitos. Locals responded with biological pest control by releasing fish in the pool, which eventually came to hold thousands of fish (numbering around 3,000 by 2015), regularly fed by a few locals.

In 2011, the existence of the fish pond in the abandoned mall began to gain attention online, drawing visitors and urban explorers. Their numbers surged in 2014 after photographs of the site went viral online and became noticed by the media. This prompted the BMA to bar entry to the site over safety concerns; it later had the fish removed and the water drained in 2015.

The building again fell into obscurity until 2020, when Supitcha Tovivich, an architecture professor at Silpakorn University, engaged a local community organization to host an exhibition on urban community development at the building, the rights to which had by now returned to the Yugala family, and which inspecting engineers had found to be structurally sound. Another exhibition was held there in 2022 as part of the Creative Economy Agency's Bangkok Design Week. The BMA has since announced plans to partially redevelop the site as a public space, with permission from the owners. (Note: Some news sources erroneously reported in 2022 that the building was being demolished, but this was actually different building in the same neighbourhood, the Bang Lamphu Department Store.)

== See also ==
- Sathorn Unique Tower, another building in Bangkok that became known as an urban exploration destination
