= Fortifications of Bangkok =

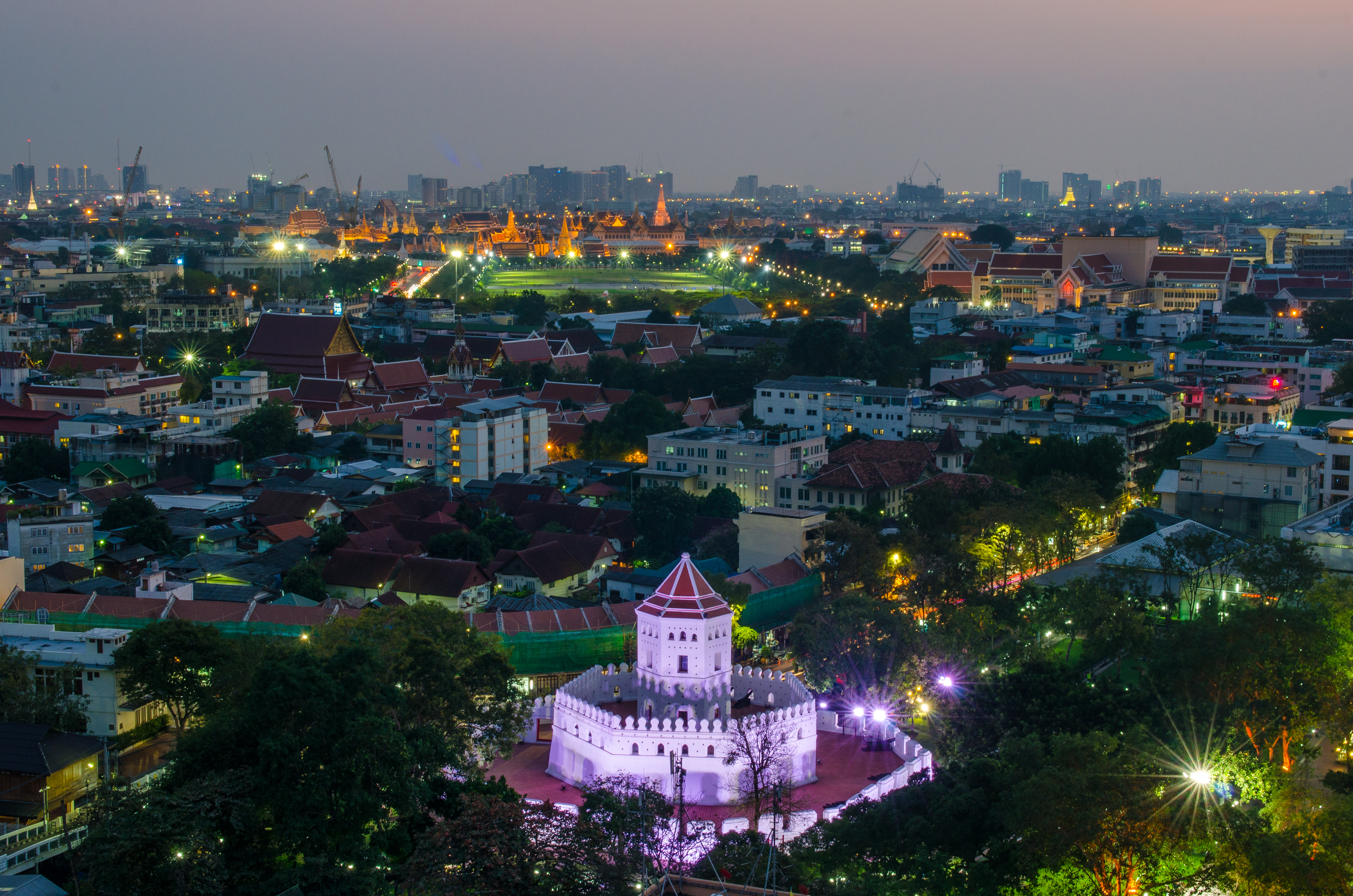
Phra Sumen Fort is one of the remaining original forts that guarded the city of Rattanakosin.

The fortifications of Bangkok consist of several series of defensive structures built to protect the city during the late Ayutthaya to early Rattanakosin periods. The earliest structures were built when Bangkok was an outpost of Ayutthaya guarding entry to the Chao Phraya River during the 15th–16th centuries. These were reinforced when the city became the site of the short-lived capital of Thonburi after the fall of Ayutthaya in 1767. New walls and forts were built when the city of Rattanakosin replaced Thonburi in 1782, which were mostly removed and replaced in the second half of the 19th century in order to accommodate the expanding city. Today, four of the city's defensive forts remain, along with two short sections of the Rattanakosin city wall and one of the city gates.

== History ==
=== Ayutthaya and Thonburi ===
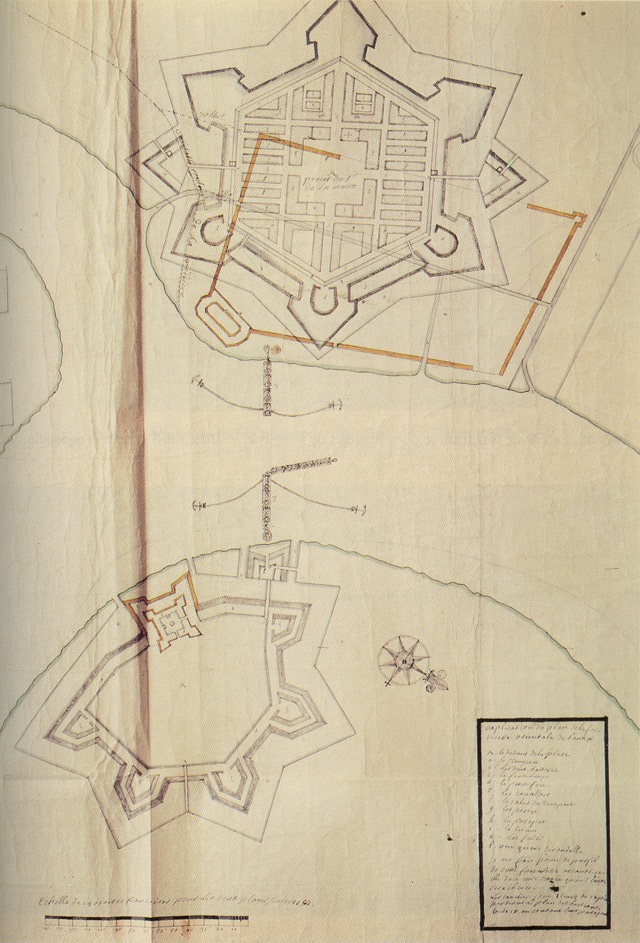
Construction plan for the 1685 bastion forts, by French engineer de Lamare. Existing city walls are shown in red; only the eastern fort (bottom) was built.

As an important outpost guarding the Chao Phraya, Bangkok (then located on the west bank of the river) was protected by city walls. A pair of forts were located at the confluence of the old river channel and the new main channel excavated around 1538, straddling the new channel. Western maps of the late 17th century show the city wall in a rectangular shape, with the western fort as a cavalier raised over the southeast corner. Two smaller bastions protected the northwest and southwest corners.

Around 1685–1687, the French-oriented King Narai commissioned the construction of Western-style bastion forts to replace them. Construction was overseen by French engineer de la Mare, but only the eastern fort had been completed when resentment of the French's growing influence led to the Siamese revolution of 1688. The French garrison holding the fort was besieged by Siamese troops for four months before being allowed to retreat, and the fort was subsequently demolished during the reign of Phetracha, who usurped the throne.

Following the fall of Ayutthaya in 1767, the newly declared King Taksin established his capital at the site of Bangkok, to be known as the Thonburi Kingdom. He extended the city proper northward as far as Bangkok Noi Canal (part of the old river channel), and had a moat dug to protect the city's western flank. The city was also extended to the eastern bank, with a moat also creating an island on the eastern side. The city walls were rebuilt along the newly created moats. The old fort on the western bank of the river was renamed Wichaiprasit (Thai: ป้อมวิไชยประสิทธิ์), and became part of the Thonburi royal palace.

=== Early Rattanakosin ===
Map showing the locations of Bangkok's forts and walls

Taksin was overthrown in 1782, and the new King Phutthayotfa Chulalok (Rama I) reestablished the capital as Rattanakosin, moving the city proper to the river's eastern bank. He had new outer moats dug, creating what is now known as Rattanakosin Island. He had the new fortifications rebuilt along these new boundaries, using materials salvaged from Taksin's old city walls and the ruins of King Narai's old fort, as well as the ruins of Ayutthaya's fortifications.

Rama I's city walls measured 7.2 kilometres (4.5 mi) in length, encircling an area of 2,589 rai (4.142 km^{2}; 1.599 sq mi). Fourteen defensive forts were built along the walls, and 63 gates provided access to the walled city. Each of the forts was named, and are as follows (from northernmost, in clockwise fashion):

1. Phra Sumen Fort (ป้อมพระสุเมรุ), at the mouth of Bang Lamphu Canal (northern section of the outer moat)
2. Yukhonthon Fort (ป้อมยุคนธร), just north of Wat Bowonniwet
3. Maha Prap Fort (ป้อมมหาปราบ), between what are now Phan Fa Lilat and Chaloem Wan Chat Bridges
4. Mahakan Fort (ป้อมมหากาฬ), now next to Phan Fa Lilat Bridge
5. Mu Thaluang Fort (ป้อมหมูทลวง), in front of the former Old Bangkok Remand Prison
6. Suea Thayan Fort (ป้อมเสือทยาน), just north of Sam Yot Gate and Damrong Sathit Bridge
7. Maha Chai Fort (ป้อมมหาไชย), near what is now the intersection of Maha Chai and Yaowarat/Phiraphong roads
8. Chak Phet Fort (ป้อมจักรเพชร), just north of the mouth of Ong Ang Canal (southern section of the outer moat), near what is now Chak Phet Road
9. Phisuea Fort (ป้อมผีเสื้อ), near what is now Pak Khlong Talat
10. Maha Roek Fort (ป้อมมหาฤกษ์), opposite Wichaiprasit Fort, now the location of Rajini School
11. Maha Yak Fort (ป้อมมหายักษ์), next to Wat Pho
12. Phra Chan Fort (ป้อมพระจันทร์), next to what is now Tha Phra Chan
13. Phra Athit Fort (ป้อมพระอาทิตย์), at what is now the end of Phra Athit Road
14. Isinthon Fort (ป้อมอิสินธร), between Phra Athit and Phra Sumen Forts

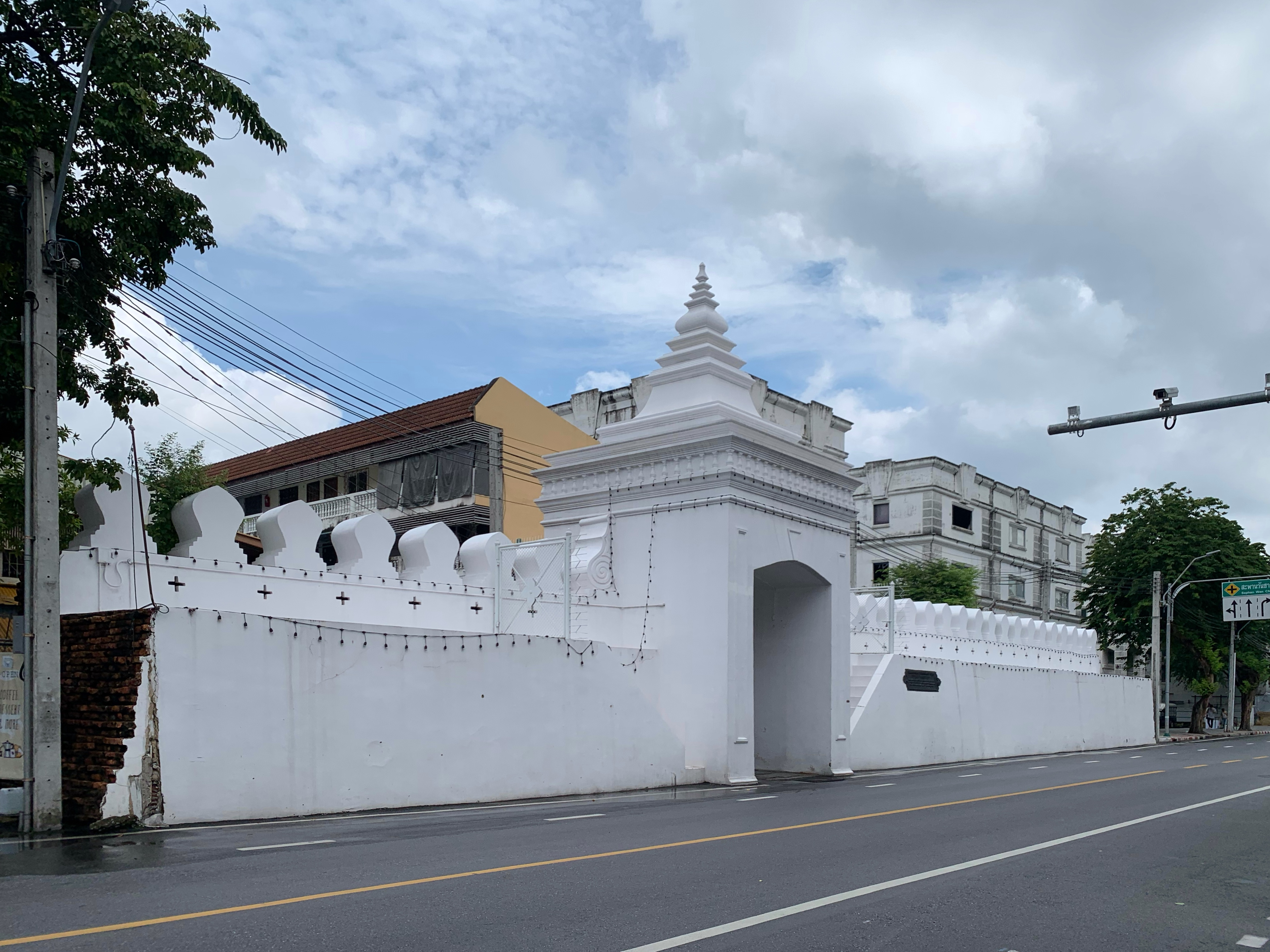
The wall section in front of Wat Bowonniwet features the last remaining of the 16 tower gates.

Of the 63 city gates, 16 were tower gates with pointed roofs. The rest were simple doors in the wall. All the gates bore enchantments warding off evil spirits, except for the gate known as Pratu Phi (ประตูผี, "Ghost Gate"), which was used to transport dead bodies out of the city. The Ghost Gate was left unenchanted in order to allow the spirits of the dead to pass. To prevent evil spirits entering, it was situated in the direct line of sight of the Emerald Buddha, enshrined on the other side of the city in the royal temple of Wat Phra Kaew. (Note: While the practice of human sacrifices during the erection of city gates was documented during the Ayutthaya period, there is no evidence of this having taken place in Bangkok.)

Rama I's fortifications were built to address traditional defence concerns, especially the lingering threat of a Burmese invasion that continued on for several decades. However, they never came into actual military use, as the Burmese threat ended following the Anglo-Burmese Wars and Britain's colonization of Burma.

=== 1852 forts ===
By the mid-19th century, Rattanakosin's walled city had become overcrowded, and King Mongkut (Rama IV) ordered the construction of Phadung Krung Kasem Canal in order to expand the city limits. Eight new forts were built in 1852 to guard the new boundary: seven along the canal, and one on the opposite bank of the river to the canal's mouth. Defensive walls, outdated by then, were no longer built.

The eight new forts received rhyming names. From south to north, they are:

1. Pong Patchamit Fort (ป้อมป้องปัจจามิตร), opposite the southern mouth of the canal on the western bank, near what is now Khlong San District Office
2. Pit Patchanuek Fort (ป้อมปิดปัจจนึก), next to the canal's southern mouth, on the eastern bank, near what is now Samphanthawong District Office
3. Huek Hiam Han Fort (ป้อมฮึกเหี้ยมหาญ), a small fort used for firing gun salutes
4. Phlan Phairi Rap Fort (ป้อมผลาญไพรีราบ), in the area of what is now Hua Lamphong Market
5. Prap Sattru Phai Fort (ป้อมปราบศัตรูพ่าย), near what is now Nopphawong Bridge. It is the namesake of Pom Prap Sattru Phai District
6. Thamlai Porapak Fort (ป้อมทำลายปรปักษ์), near what is now Chaturaphak Rangsarit Bridge
7. Hak Kamlang Datsakon Fort (ป้อมหักกำลังดัสกร), near what is now Makkhawan Rangsan Bridge
8. Maha Nakhon Raksa Fort (ป้อมมหานครรักษา), next to the canal's northern mouth

=== Demolition and preservation ===
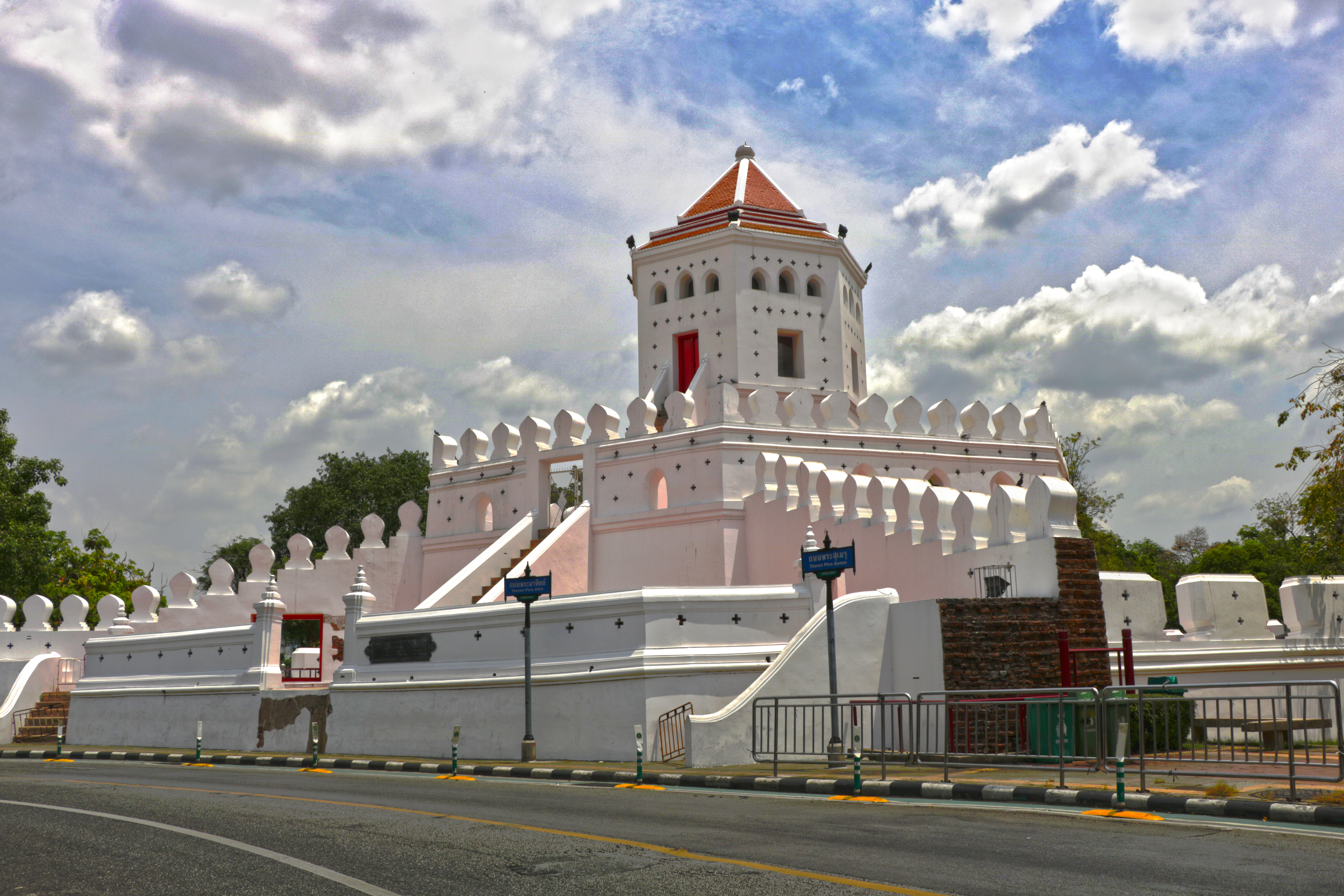
Phra Sumen Fort

Bangkok underwent rapid modernization beginning in the late 19th century, and by the 1920s most of the city's original forts and walls had been demolished to make way for the construction of roads and buildings. During the reign of King Prajadhipok (Rama VII, 1925–1935), the Royal Society resolved to preserve the two remaining original forts, Phra Sumen and Mahakan, for their historical value.

Today, Four of Bangkok's defensive forts remain, one of which is still in military use. Wichaiprasit Fort, the oldest, is now owned by the Royal Thai Navy. Phra Sumen Fort and Mahakan Fort are under the care of the Bangkok Metropolitan Administration (BMA), and part of Pong Patchamit Fort is preserved behind the Khlong San District Office. In addition, a section of the city wall is preserved in front of Wat Bowonniwet, and another section remains connected to Mahakan Fort. These structures, as well as the canals that formed the city moats, are listed as registered ancient monuments.

== Present structures ==
=== Wichaiprasit Fort ===
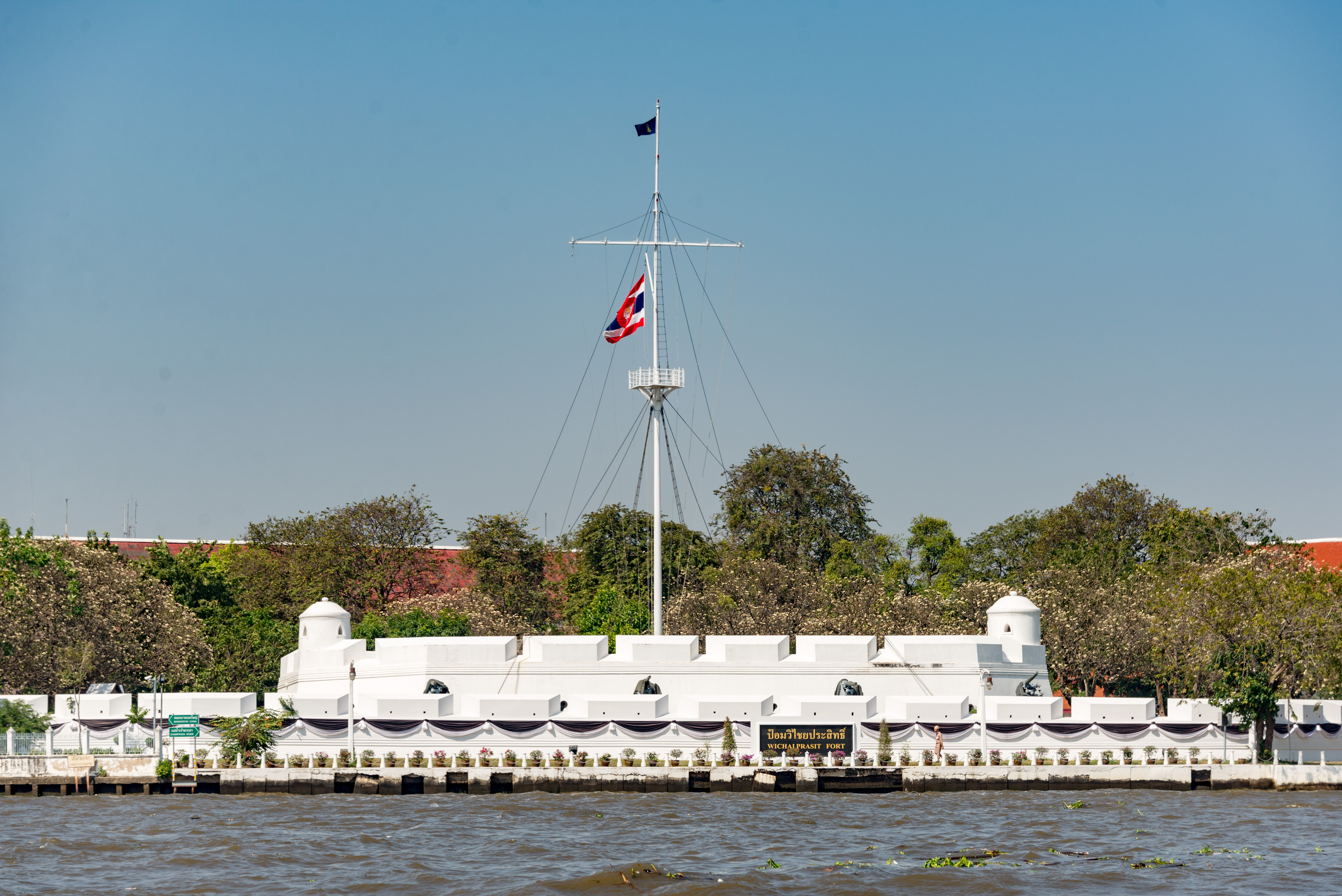
Wichaiprasit Fort

Wichaiprasit Fort (13°44′32″N 100°29′27″E) is now part of the Royal Thai Navy Headquarters. The fort, along with the royal palace of Thonburi, had been given for the establishment of the Royal Thai Naval Academy in 1903, and became home to the Navy's headquarters after the academy relocated in 1946. A gaff-rigged flagpole was erected in 1971, and has since been used to fly the Naval Ensign. The fort has been used ceremonially for the firing of gun salutes since 1979, when Memorial Bridge was permanently lowered, preventing warships from sailing upriver to perform the task.

=== Phra Sumen Fort ===
Phra Sumen Fort is the northernmost of Rattanakosin's original forts, located at the mouth of Khlong Rop Krung (the moat) where it meets the river, today the corner of Phra Sumen and Phra Athit roads (13°45′50″N 100°29′45″E). The octagonal fort is built of masonry on a 2-metre (6 ft 7 in)-deep spread footing foundation. It is 45 metres (148 ft) in diameter, and has a height of 10.5 metres (34 ft) measured to top of the sema-shaped battlements of the upper level. The fort has rectangular battlements on the lower level, and is topped by a roofed heptagonal tower, which collapsed sometime during the reigns of kings Rama V to Rama VII and was rebuilt in 1981 to celebrate the bicentennial of the city's foundation. The surrounding area was subsequently developed into Santichaiprakan Park, which opened in 2000.

=== Mahakan Fort ===
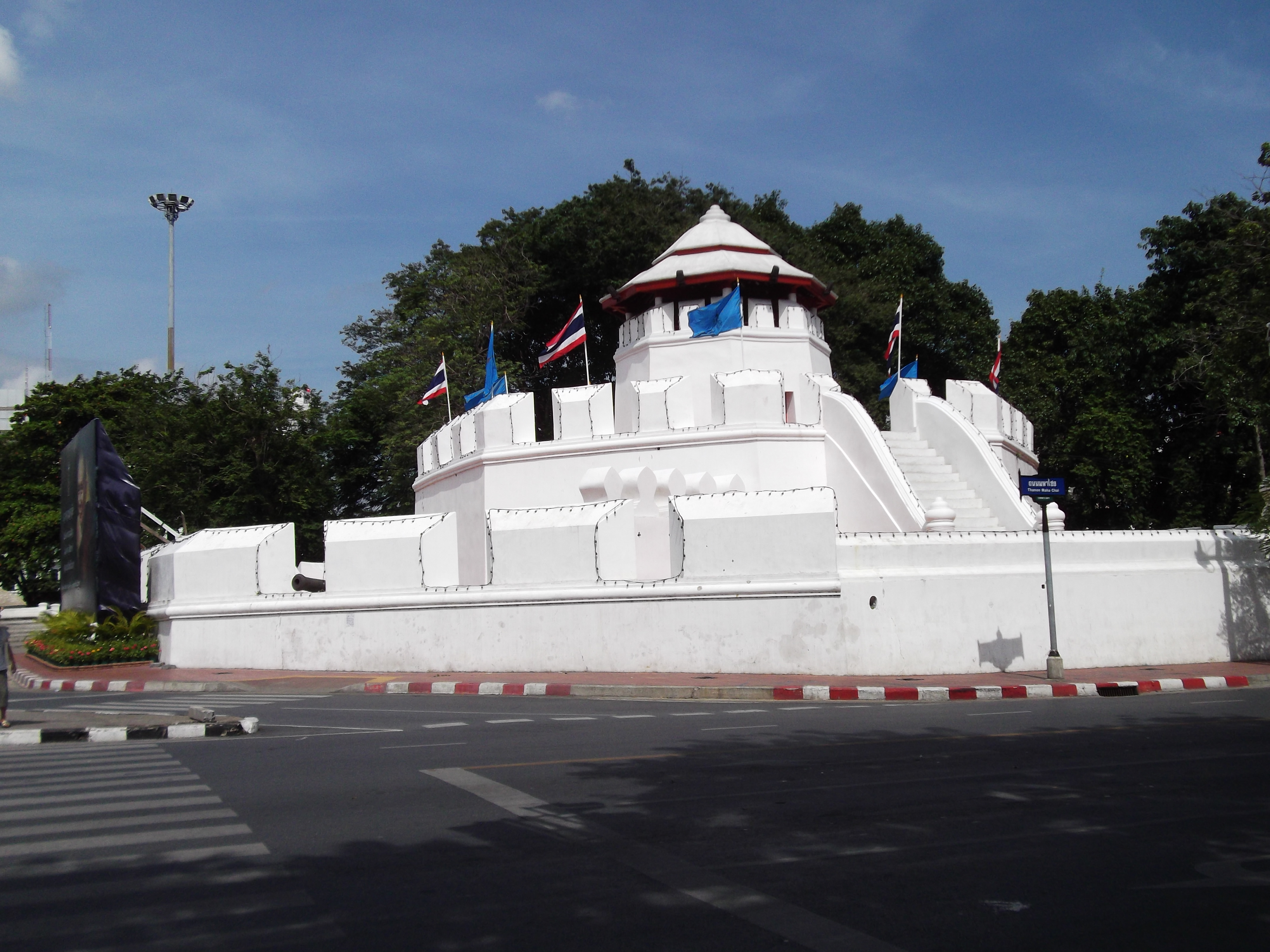
Mahakan Fort

Mahakan Fort is the easternmost fort of Rattanakosin's walls, now situated next to Phan Fa Lilat Bridge of Ratchadamnoen Avenue and the junction of Khlong Maha Nak (the beginning of Saen Saep Canal) and Khlong Rop Krung (13°45′20″N 100°30′20″E). The fort, also octagonal in shape and in three levels, has a diameter of 38 metres (125 ft) and a height of 19 metres (62 ft), measured to the roof of the octagonal tower. Mahakan Fort has rectangular battlements on both its lower and upper levels, while the connected 180-metre (590 ft)-long section of the city walls features sema-shaped battlements. The fort and walls were also restored in 1981 for the city's bicentennial.

Near Mahakan Fort, between the city wall and the canal, lies an old community whose wooden houses serve as an example of historic vernacular architecture. The community has been engaged in a decades-long struggle against eviction by the BMA, which intends to develop the area as a public park. Although agreements had been made in the 2000s to preserve and develop the neighbourhood as a living museum, the deals later broke down, and the BMA began demolishing houses whose owners accepted compensation in 2016. Other residents are still resisting eviction as of 2017, and there are still hopes that some of the buildings will be preserved. As of April 2018, all remaining residents have been evicted, and plans are underway to tear the remaining buildings down. However, the Mahakan Fort Community’s Facebook page has announced an initiative to create an online database about the Mahakan Fort community, and is crowdsourcing information about the site. In July 2018, BMA was completely developed surrounding area of Mahakan Fort to become a public park and the fort exhibition.

=== City wall in front of Wat Bowonniwet ===
Another section of the city wall, 40 metres (130 ft) in length, along with a tower gate, remains in front of Wat Bowonniwet (13°45′36″N 100°30′06″E). The wall here is 1.8 metres (5 ft 11 in) thick and 6 metres (20 ft) high. Also featuring sema-shaped battlements, steps beside the gate provided access to the top of the wall. The gate's 12-metre (39 ft) pointed roof, which had earlier collapsed, was rebuilt in 1981 using photographic evidence from the reign of King Rama V.

=== Pong Patchamit Fort ===
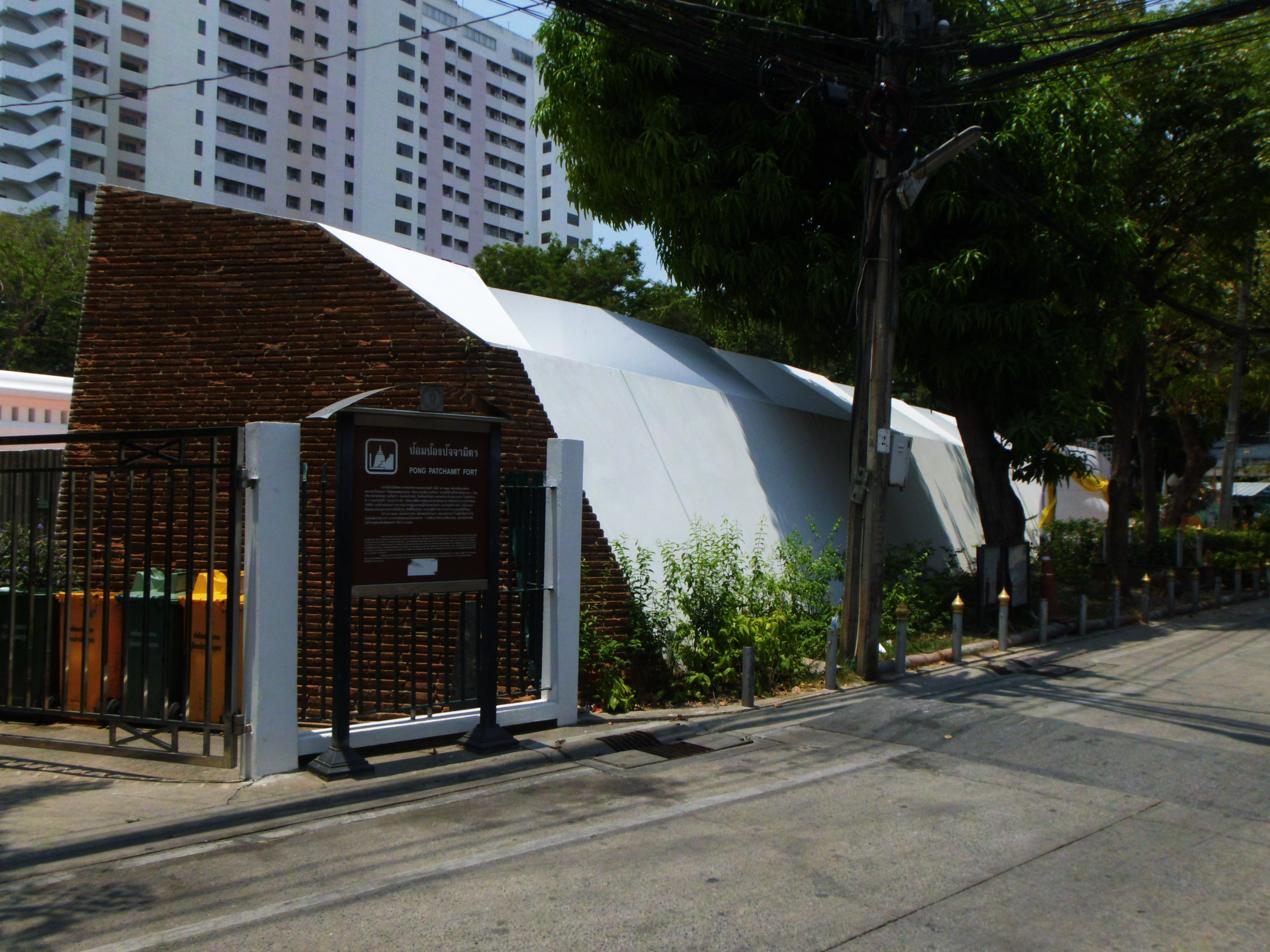
Section of the walls of Pong Patchamit Fort

Pong Patchamit Fort is the only remaining of those built in 1852–1854 to guard Phadung Krung Kasem Canal. In contrast to the earlier forts which were towers in the city wall, these were large star-shaped forts similar to those of Western design. Pong Patchamit Fort is situated on the west bank of the river, today in Khlong San District (13°43′51″N 100°30′34″E). It guarded the river together with the opposite Pit Patchanuek Fort, and fired gun salutes welcoming royal envoys during the time of King Mongkut. During King Chulalongkorn's reign, the Marine Department began flying signal flags from a pole installed at the fort.

Today, only a small section of the fort remains (an estimated area of 852 square metres (9,170 sq ft) out of the original 10,233 square metres (110,150 sq ft)). While official requests to scrap the fort for materials were documented as early as 1907, these were initially rejected, and it is unknown when the partial demolition took place. The site remains under the authority of the Marine Department, while the Khlong San District Office building now occupies part of the fort's former area.

== See also ==
- History of Bangkok
