= Lan Khon Mueang =

- Town square
- ลานคนเมือง
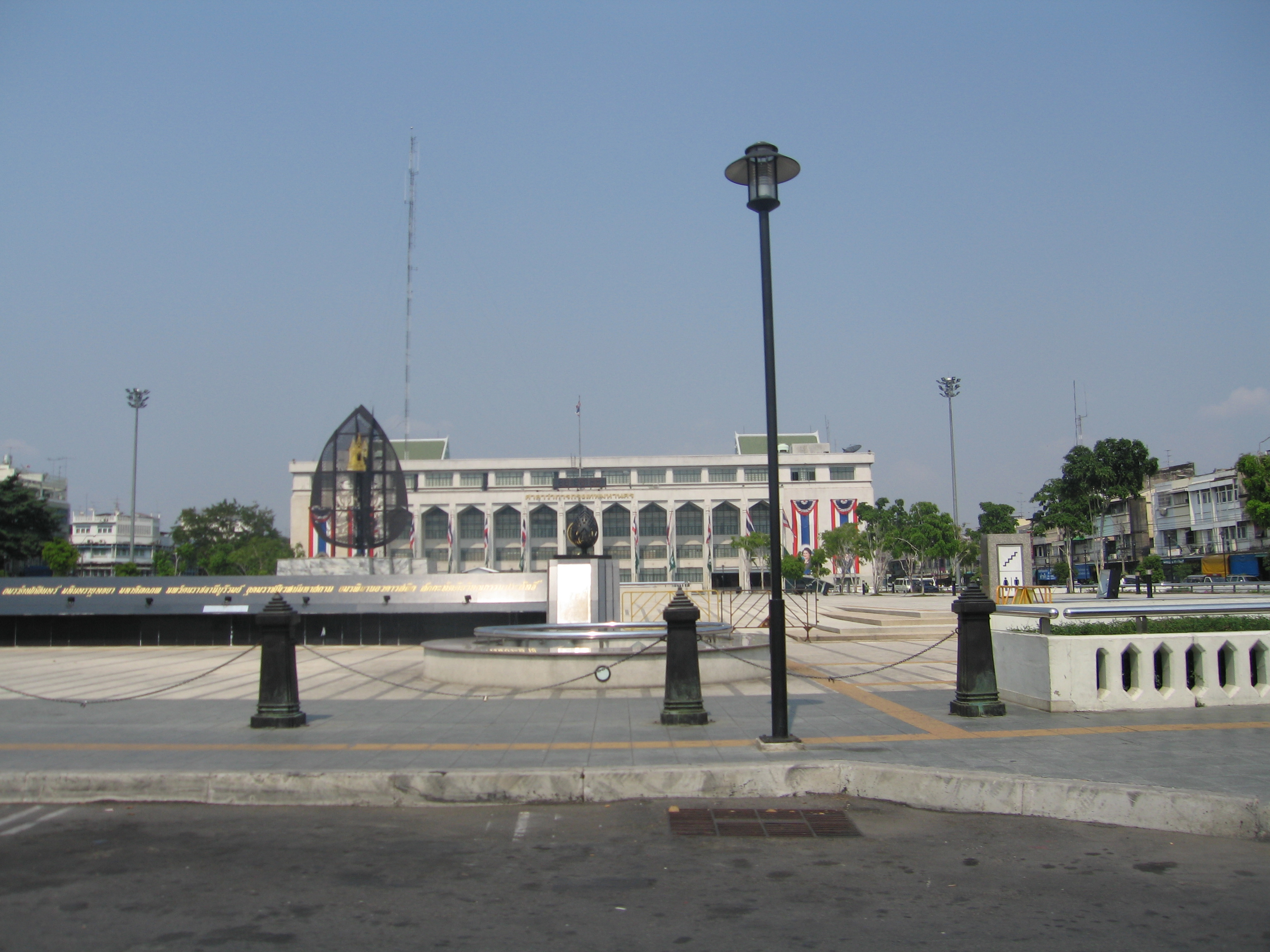
- Features: Multipurpose area for public activities
- Amenities: Public restrooms underground parking
- Manager: Bangkok Metropolitan Administration
- Location: Dinso Road, Sao Chingcha subdistrict, Phra Nakhon district, Bangkok, Thailand
- Interactive map of Lan Khon Mueang
- Coordinates: 13°45′9.98″N 100°30′5.62″E

Lan Khon Mueang (Thai: ลานคนเมือง) is a public square located in front of Bangkok City Hall on Dinso Road, Sao Chingcha Subdistrict, Phra Nakhon District, Bangkok, Thailand. It serves as a public space for recreation, exercise, and public events, including cultural activities and events organized by various agencies

The square is situated within the Sao Chingcha neighbourhood, an area with a history dating back to the early Rattanakosin period. Its land use has changed over time, from a site associated with religious ceremonies to a commercial area and government premises, before becoming a public space in its present form.

== Etymology ==
Lan Khon Mueang (Thai: ลานคนเมือง) is a Thai name composed of lan (ลาน), meaning an open space or square, and khon mueang (คนเมือง), meaning city residents or townspeople. The name can be translated as "Townspeople's Square" or "City Residents' Plaza". It was officially adopted following the site's redevelopment as a public space in 2003.

== History ==
Aerial photograph showing the garden behind the Bangkok Municipal Office, approximately five years after its relocation

The area was originally agricultural land before becoming part of the Rattanakosin capital in 1782. During the reign of King Rama I, the Devasathan Brahmin Temple and the Giant Swing were established in 1784 for Hinduism ceremonies, especially the Triyampawai ceremony. The present site of Lan Khon Mueang, located in front of the temple, is believed to have been used for related religious ceremonies, although direct historical evidence remains limited.

During the reigns of Kings Rama IV and Rama V, the neighbourhood transformed into a commercial district. A gasworks was established on the site in 1874 and later replaced by Sao Chingcha Market, which opened in 1901. Following the abolition of Siam's absolute monarchy in 1932, the swing ceremony was discontinued, with its last performance taking place in 1934. The market was subsequently demolished when the municipal offices were relocated to the site in 1941, creating an open area in front of the municipal building. The square was landscaped in 1982, although it continued to serve primarily as a car park. During the early 2000s, the Bangkok Metropolitan Administration redeveloped the site as a public space with underground parking facilities and officially named it Lan Khon Mueang in 2003.

=== Future development ===
Since the 1990s, proposals have been made to relocate government offices from the original Bangkok City Hall to the new hall in Din Daeng and redevelop the former municipal complex. In 2023, the Bangkok Metropolitan Administration introduced Policy 126, proposing to convert the original City Hall into the Bangkok City Museum and a tourism information centre, while developing Lan Khon Mueang as a public space for cultural activities, exhibitions, meetings, and performances. The administration, in collaboration with the Faculty of Architecture at Silpakorn University, has undertaken studies and prepared redevelopment designs, with a budget request planned for 2027.

== Layout and use ==
Promotional event for the television series Squid Game at Lan Khon Mueang

Lan Khon Mueang is an open public square between Bangkok City Hall and the Giant Swing. Its upper level accommodates public gatherings and outdoor activities, while two underground levels provide parking facilities. The square is used for recreation, exercise, cultural events, festivals, and public gatherings, with free public access.

Events held at the square have included the outdoor film festival Bangkok Klang Plaeng in 2022, a political gathering organised by the Ratsadon Stop APEC 2022 network in November 2022, and promotional activities for the third season of Squid Game in June and July 2025. It has also hosted Bangkok Songkran celebrations, including traditional ceremonies and cultural performances in April 2026.
