= Bangkok Comprehensive Plan =

The Bangkok Comprehensive Plan (BCP, Thai: แผนที่ผังเมืองรวมกรุงเทพมหานคร) is the master plan for Bangkok created by the Bangkok Metropolitan Administration. The BCP serves as the "blueprint for the city's development, setting out planning and design guidelines for land use zoning, transportation, open space, public utility, water, and environment and natural resources."

The current and third revision of the Comprehensive Plan was approved in 2013. The fourth revision of the Comprehensive Plan is undergoing drafting and is expected to be promulgated in mid-2027.

== Third revision (2013) ==
The third revision established floor area ratio (FAR) zoning for the city to regulate density.

== Fourth revision (2027) ==
On 8 December 2023, Governor of Bangkok Chadchart Sittipunt announced the draft fourth revision CMP. The drafting has been overseen by Deputy Governor of Bangkok Wisanu Subsompon. The draft was submitted to the Ministry of Interior's Department of Public Works and Town & Country Planning in June 2025.

The plan begins its final 90-day public notice period in June 2026.

The fourth revision includes rezoning of areas along the high speed rail linking three airports, and identified nine priority areas for transit-oriented development and tourism conservation. The fourth revision will also incorporate planning strategies to reduce urban heat.

== See also ==
- Mass Rapid Transit Master Plan in Bangkok Metropolitan Region
