= Saphan Wan Chat =

Chaloem Wan Chat Bridge สะพานเฉลิมวันชาติ
- Intersection sign used for the bridge
- Coordinates: 13°45′33.80″N 100°30′08.94″E
- Carries: Prachathipatai Road
- Crosses: Khlong Rop Krung (Khlong Bang Lamphu)
- Locale: Bowon Niwet and Ban Phan Thom Sub-Districts, Phra Nakhon District, Bangkok, Thailand
- Official name: Chaloem Wan Chat Bridge
- Other name(s): Wan Chat Bridge
- Maintained by: Bangkok Metropolitan Administration (BMA)

History
- Opened: 1940

Chaloem Wan Chat Bridge (Thai: สะพานเฉลิมวันชาติ, RTGS: Saphan Chaloem Wan Chat, pronounced [sā.pʰāːn t͡ɕʰā.lɤ̌ːm wān t͡ɕʰâːt]; lit. 'national day celebration bridge'; usually known simply as Saphan Wan Chat) is both a bridge and a four-way intersection located in the Bang Lamphu area, where the Bowon Niwet and Ban Phan Thom subdistricts of Phra Nakhon district meet. It's not far from Khaosan and Rambuttri roads.

The bridge spans Khlong Rop Krung (lit. 'the canal around the city'), also popularly known as Khlong Bang Lamphu, which also marks the historical boundary of Bangkok's old city; crossing the bridge toward the northeast marks the point where one exits Rattanakosin Island.

It was built in 1940 by the government of Field Marshal Plaek Phibunsongkhram to commemorate Thailand's National Day. The bridge also marks the beginning of Prachathipatai road, which continues northeastward from Dinso road. Phra Sumen road crosses the bridge's southwestern end at the eponymous Saphan Wan Chat intersection.

The surrounding area is well known for its many long-running shops selling national flags, royal portrait frames, and various other ceremonial items, as well as for its hostels, restaurants and cafés that serve tourists in a way similar to what is found on nearby Khaosan and Rambuttri roads.

== Surroundings ==
- Wat Bowonniwet
- Palace Gate Remnants
- Democracy Monument
- Wat Tri Thotsathep
- Ban Phan Thom–the last community of silversmith in Bangkok
- Queen Sirikit Gallery
