= Faculty of Medicine, Bangkokthonburi University =

- คณะแพทยศาสตร์ มหาวิทยาลัยกรุงเทพธนบุรี
- Type: Private
- Established: 12 June 2019
- Parent institution: Bangkokthonburi University
- Dean: Emeritus Prof. Saranatra Waikakul, M.D.
- Location: Bangkok, Thailand
- Website: www.md-btu.com

Faculty of Medicine, Bangkokthonburi University is a private medical school in Thailand, operated by Bangkokthonburi University.

== History ==
The Faculty of Medicine, Bangkokthonburi University was established on 12 June 2019. Its establishment was supported by the Department of Medical Services of Bangkok Metropolitan Administration and the Faculty of Medicine Vajira Hospital, Navamindradhiraj University; the latter of which is also a sister institution. The medical program emphasizes on family medicine and geriatrics as well as community and urban medicine, in order to meet the demand for healthcare from Thailand's growing aging population.

The medicine course (M.D.) was approved by the Medical Council of Thailand in 2021 and first opened for medical education in the 2022 academic year.

== Teaching Hospitals ==
- Ratchaphiphat Hospital (main)
- Luang Pho Taweesak Hospital
- Vajira Hospital

== See also ==
- List of medical schools in Thailand
