= Taksin Hospital =

Hospital in Bangkok, Thailand

Taksin Hospital โรงพยาบาลตากสิน
- Medical Service Department, Bangkok Metropolitan Administration

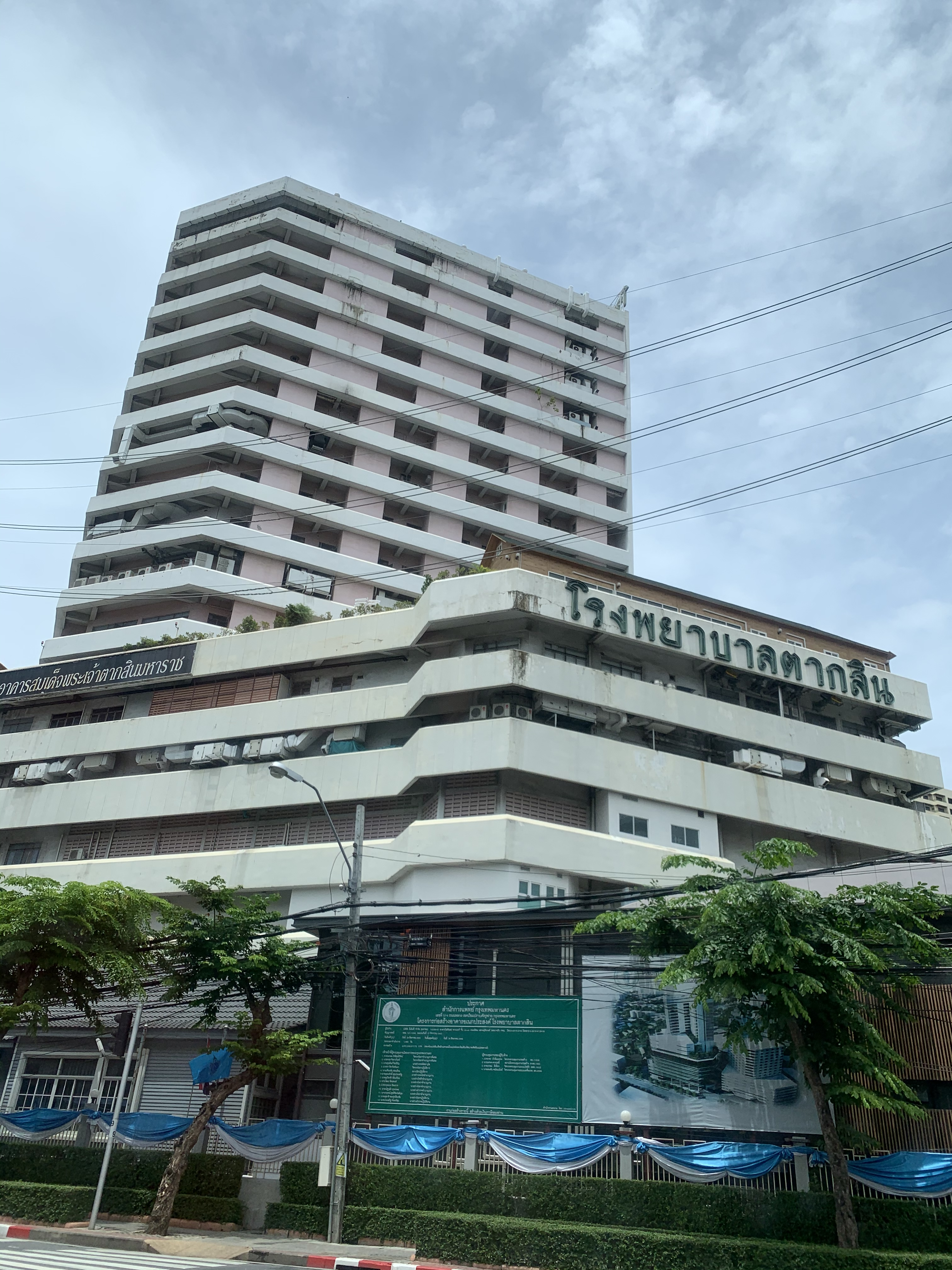
- Taksin Hospital, 2021

Geography
- Location: 543 Somdet Chao Phraya Road, Khlong San Subdistrict, Khlong San District, Bangkok 10600, Thailand
- Coordinates: 13.730455°N 100.508644°E

Organisation
- Type: Teaching
- Affiliated university: Faculty of Medicine Vajira Hospital, Navamindradhiraj University; Faculty of Medicine Siriraj Hospital, Mahidol University

Services
- Beds: 473

History
- Former name: Cholera Hospital Municipality Hospital Bangkok Hospital
- Opened: 15 February 1904

Links
- Website: www.taksinhosp.go.th/tks.html
- Lists: Hospitals in Thailand

Taksin Hospital (Thai: โรงพยาบาลตากสิน) is a hospital in Thailand located in Khlong San District, Bangkok. Taksin Hospital is a public hospital operated by the Medical Service Department, Bangkok Metropolitan Administration (BMA). It is an affiliated hospital of the Faculty of Medicine Vajira Hospital. It is an affiliated teaching hospital of the Faculty of Medicine Siriraj Hospital, Mahidol University. It is served by Khlong San BTS station since 16 December 2020.

== History ==
Following an outbreak of cholera, the hospital was established on 15 February 1904 as the 'Cholera Hospital'. with the royal permission of King Chulalongkorn (Rama V) in order to prevent the spread of infectious diseases, particularly cholera and smallpox. Initially it was under the management of the Metropolitan Sanitation Department. In 1937, operations were transferred to the Bangkok Municipality Administration (Tesaban Nakhon Krungthep) and renamed 'Municipality Hospital', where it was used primarily as a rehabilitation centre for patients from Klang Hospital and Vajira Hospital. Therefore, locally it was known as the 'Rehabilitation Hospital'. In 1972, as the Capital Municipality Administration (Tesaban Nakhon Luang) was created following the merger of the Bangkok and Thonburi Municipality Administration, the hospital began serving normal patients and was renamed to 'Bangkok Hospital'. On 11 September 1973, the name was again changed to the current 'Taksin Hospital' by King Bhumibol Adulyadej in commemoration of King Taksin's founding of Thonburi Kingdom, the area of which is where the hospital is located in.

Since the 2020 academic year, Taksin Hospital became an affiliated hospital of the Faculty of Medicine Vajira Hospital for training a cohort of 20 undergraduate medical students per year.

== See also ==
- Health in Thailand
- Healthcare in Thailand
- Hospitals in Thailand
