= Vajira Hospital =

Hospital in Bangkok, Thailand

Vajira Hospital วชิรพยาบาล
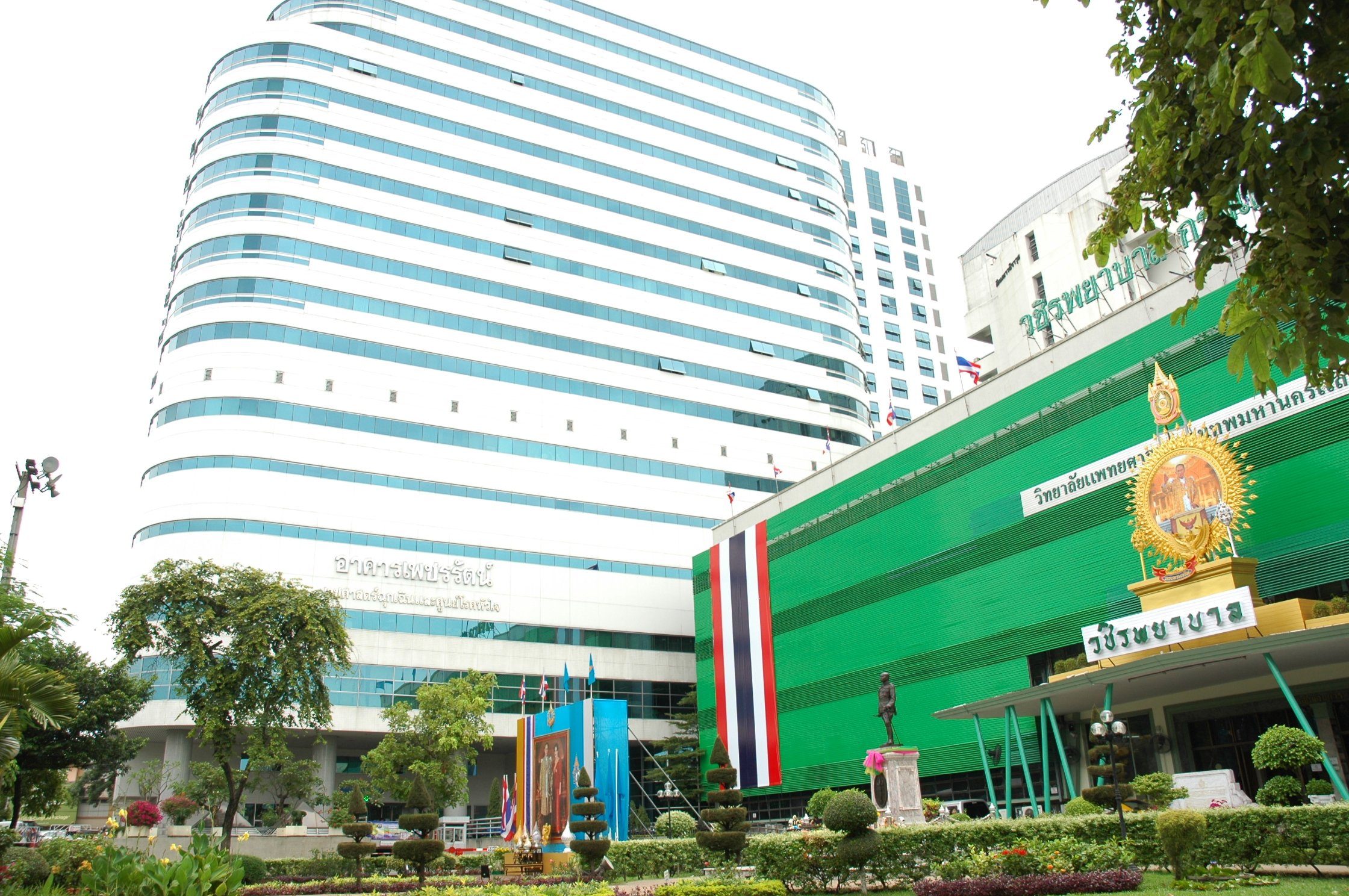

Geography
- Location: 681 Samsen Road, Dusit, Bangkok 10300, Thailand 13°46′50″N 100°30′33″E

Organisation
- Type: Teaching, Public
- Affiliated university: Faculty of Medicine Vajira Hospital, Navamindradhiraj University; Kuakarun Faculty of Nursing, Navamindradhiraj University; Faculty of Medicine, Bangkokthonburi University; Faculty of Medicine, Srinakharinwirot University (affiliate)

Services
- Emergency department: S.M.A.R.T emergency medical service
- Beds: 900

History
- Founded: Jan 2, 1913 (B.E. 2455)

Links
- Website: www.vajira.ac.th

Vajira Hospital (Thai: วชิรพยาบาล, RTGS: Wachiraphayaban) is one of the first hospitals in Thailand, founded by King Rama VI. It is a teaching university hospital of the Faculty of Medicine Vajira Hospital, Navamindradhiraj University; the Faculty of Medicine, Bangkokthonburi University and an affiliated teaching hospital of the Faculty of Medicine, Srinakharinwirot University. It is situated on Samsen Road, Dusit District, Bangkok, Thailand.

== Background ==
Vajira Hospital is funded and operated by the Bangkok Metropolitan Administration (BMA). Following the establishment of the Faculty of Medicine Vajira Hospital (then BMA Medical College) it has been a teaching hospital since. It now houses the campus of the Faculty of Medicine, and also the training center of the Kuakarun Faculty of Nursing which are faculties of Navamindradhiraj University. Vajira is known for its excellency in clinical services, medical education and urban medication programs.

The hospital serves a large numbers of patients, serving more than 700,000 out-patient visits and around 30,000 in-patient admitted annually, predominantly in general healthcare, it also has various specialized departments and excellency centers such as a Cardiovascular center, an Oncology center, Neurosurgery center, Kidney center, and a Trauma center, one of Bangkok's finest Emergency Medicine center, and many more, serving as a referral center for many other hospitals. It has an in-patient capacity of 900 beds, the largest operated by the BMA, and within some of the country's largest hospitals.

== History ==
King Vajiravudh Memorial Building, now a hospital museum

Public healthcare facilities or modern hospitals only became available in Siam in the late 19th century. But the number and quality of facilities were still insufficient to meet the rising public demand. When H.M. the King Vajiravudh (Rama VI) ascended to the throne, he follow a royal tradition that Kings of Siam would build temples and monasteries in order to contribute to Buddhism. However at the time, there were already large numbers of religious sites in Bangkok, so H.M. the King Vajiravudh decides on building a hospital instead, as to improve the lives of citizens, providing efficient primary healthcare. He donated money from his own private funds for the establishment of the hospital. The hospital was built in an area once called "Himmapan Garden" located in the northern part of Bangkok, near the bank of Chao Phraya River.

The hospital was opened by King Vajiravudh on January 2, 1913 (B.E. 2455). The King named the hospital "Wachiraphayaban" (วชิรพยาบาล) translated "Vajira Healthcare" or simply "Vajira Hospital". The hospital was appointed to the Ministry of Metropolis (กระทรวงนครบาล) for administration, but currently operated by the Bangkok Metropolitan Administration. It was one of the earliest built modern hospitals in Bangkok, serving areas of northern Bangkok and northern part of Thonburi areas.

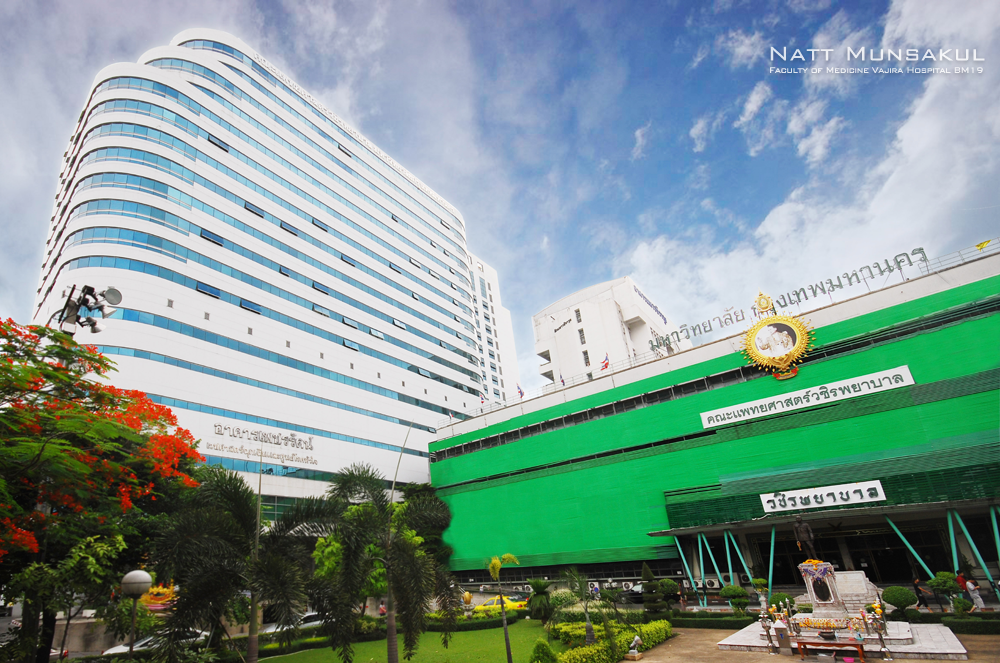
Entrance of Vajira Hospital in 2011

In 1923, Prince Mahidol, the father of Thai modern medicine, was appointed director of the hospital. Vajira hospital underwent immense changes and improvements. It expanded from its historic site next to Samsen road to the edges of the Chao Phraya River. In 1954 it became a teaching hospital for its nursing school, now Kuakarun college of nursing. In 1985 it became a Medical School known as the Faculty of Medicine Srinakharinwirot University. Srinakharinwirot medical student attend clinical years training at Vajira hospital. Later on in 1993 the BMA Medical College was established, which headquarters here in Vajira hospital. BMA medical students spends their pre-clinic years at Mahidol University and clinic years in Vajira hospital. At the time Vajira hospital handles over 600 medical students, in clinic years alone.

By 1998 Vajira Hospital and BMA Medical College were merged to form a unity in healthcare services and education, under the name "BMA Medical College & Vajira Hospital". In 2010 BMA Medical College & Vajira Hospital along with Kuakarun College of Nursing joined to form a new University named University of Bangkok Metropolis, with the medical school's name changed to "Faculty of Medicine Vajira Hospital, University of Bangkok Metropolis".

== 2025 Sinkhole Incident ==
On 24 September 2025, a large sinkhole formed on Samsen Road in front of Vajira Hospital in the Dusit district of Bangkok, Thailand, at approximately 07:00–07:15 local time. The sinkhole, measuring approximately 30 meters wide, 30 meters long, and up to 50 meters deep, swallowed vehicles, including a police tow truck and a pickup truck, and caused the collapse of electricity poles and water pipes. No injuries or fatalities were reported.

The incident was attributed to construction work on the MRT Purple Line extension, specifically at the underground Vajira Hospital station, where a leak or structural failure at the tunnel-station junction caused soil and sediment to flow into the tunnel, leading to surface subsidence. Bangkok Governor Chadchart Sittipunt confirmed the cause and oversaw immediate response efforts.

== See also ==
- Faculty of Medicine Vajira Hospital, Navamindradhiraj University – Medical school in Bangkok, Thailand
- List of hospitals in Bangkok
- List of hospitals in Thailand
- List of University hospitals in Thailand
- Navamindradhiraj University – University in Thailand
