= Ban Phan Thom =

Coordinates: 13°45′41.8″N 100°30′01.7″E

Ban Phan Thom บ้านพานถม
- Khwaeng
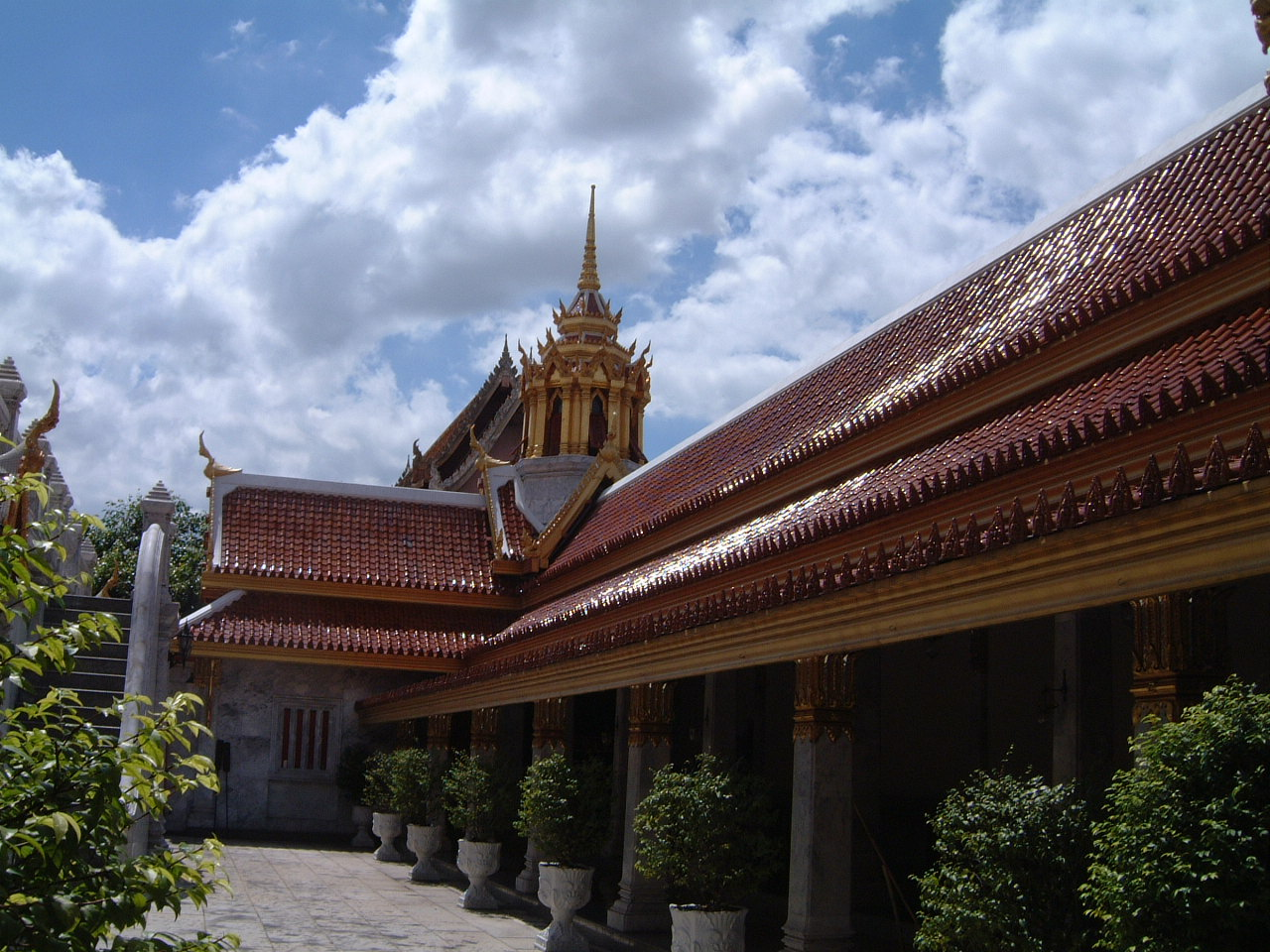
- Wat Tri Thotsathep Worawihan, a prominent local temple

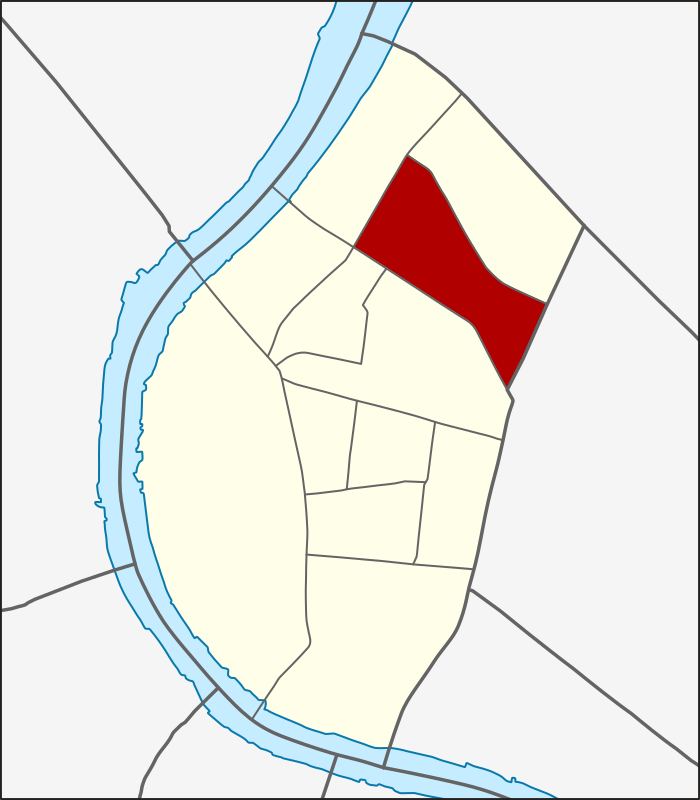
- Location in Phra Nakhon District
- Country: Thailand
- Province: Bangkok
- Khet: Phra Nakhon

Area
  - Total: 0.414 km^{2} (0.160 sq mi)

Population (2020)
  - Total: 6,092
- Time zone: UTC+7 (ICT)
- Postal code: 10200
- TIS 1099: 100110

Ban Phan Thom (Thai: บ้านพานถม, pronounced [bâːn pʰāːn tʰǒm]) is a community and a khwaeng (sub-district) of Phra Nakhon District, Bangkok.

== History ==
Ban Phan Thom is a traditional community since the early Rattanakosin period alike Ban Bu and Ban Chang Lo in Thonburi's Bangkok Noi District, Ban Bat and Ban Dok Mai of Pom Prap Sattru Phai District, as well as Ban Chang Thong on Ti Thong Road etc. They are all communities of craft artisans since ancient times.

For Ban Phan Thom was a community having been set up since the early Rattanakosin period by people from Nakhon Si Thammarat in southern region. The community, built up from their household member's cooperation, was called "Ban Phan Thom" because of its specialization in making Khrueang Thom (nielloware), either for household utensils for decorations. During King Narai the Great's reign of Ayutthaya Kingdom, niellowares were presented to King Louis XIV of France as the royal gift, showing that nielloware exclusively belonged to the high ranking elite's uses in the past. However, there is just only one household left in the area today which still inherits the traditional technique and process of making nielloware like in the old days.

The entrance of Ban Phan Thom community is located on the Phra Sumen Road near Saphan Wan Chat Intersection and Palace Gate Remnants in Bang Lamphu neighbourhood opposite to Wat Bowonniwet.

== Geography ==
Neighboring sub-districts are (from north clockwise): Bang Khun Phrom, Wat Sommanat of Pom Prap Sattru Phai District, Bowon Niwet, Talat Yot, Chana Songkhram, and Wat Sam Phraya.

== Places ==
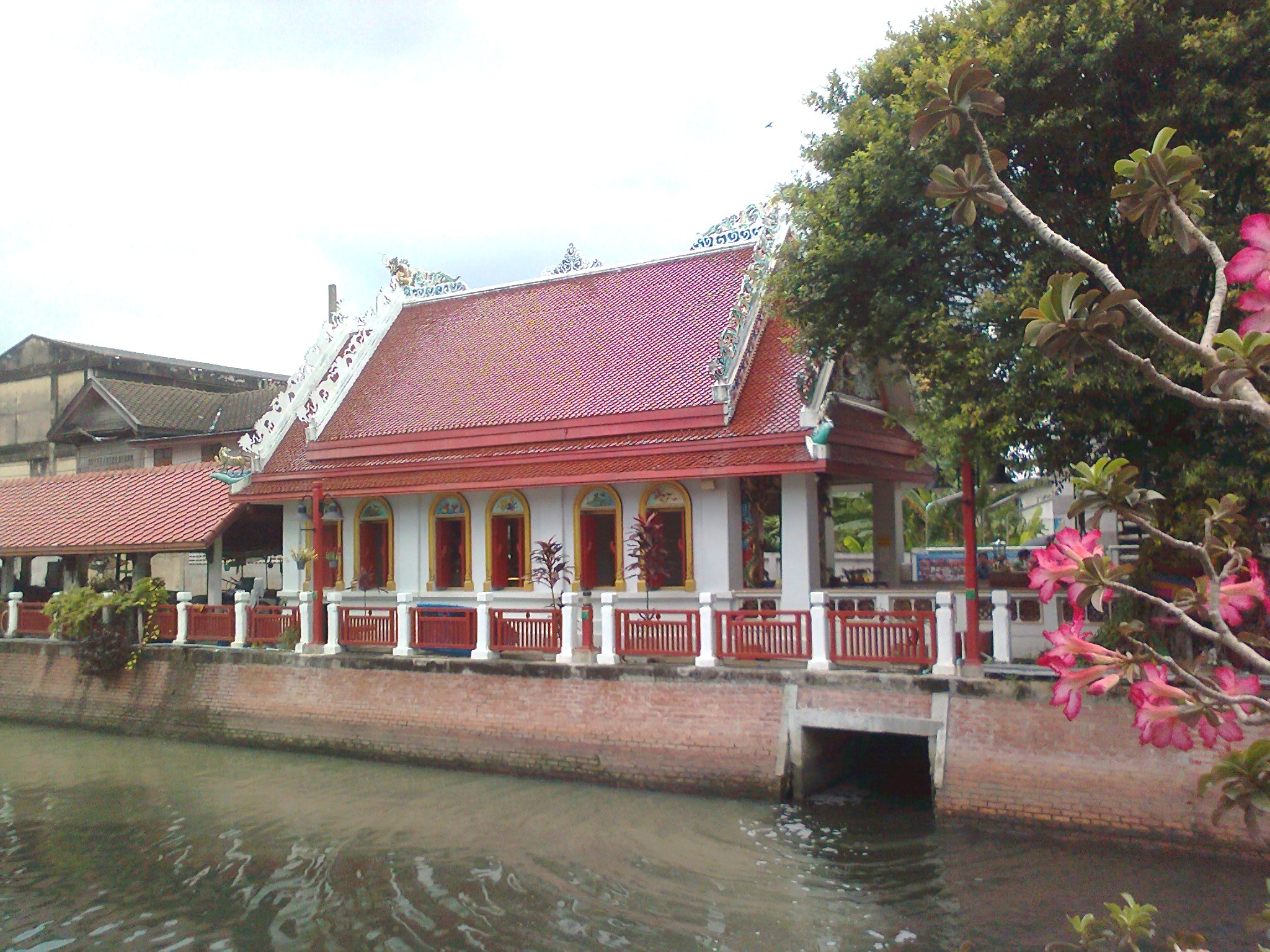
King Taksin Shrine by the Khlong Bang Lamphu (seen from Wat Bowonniwet side).

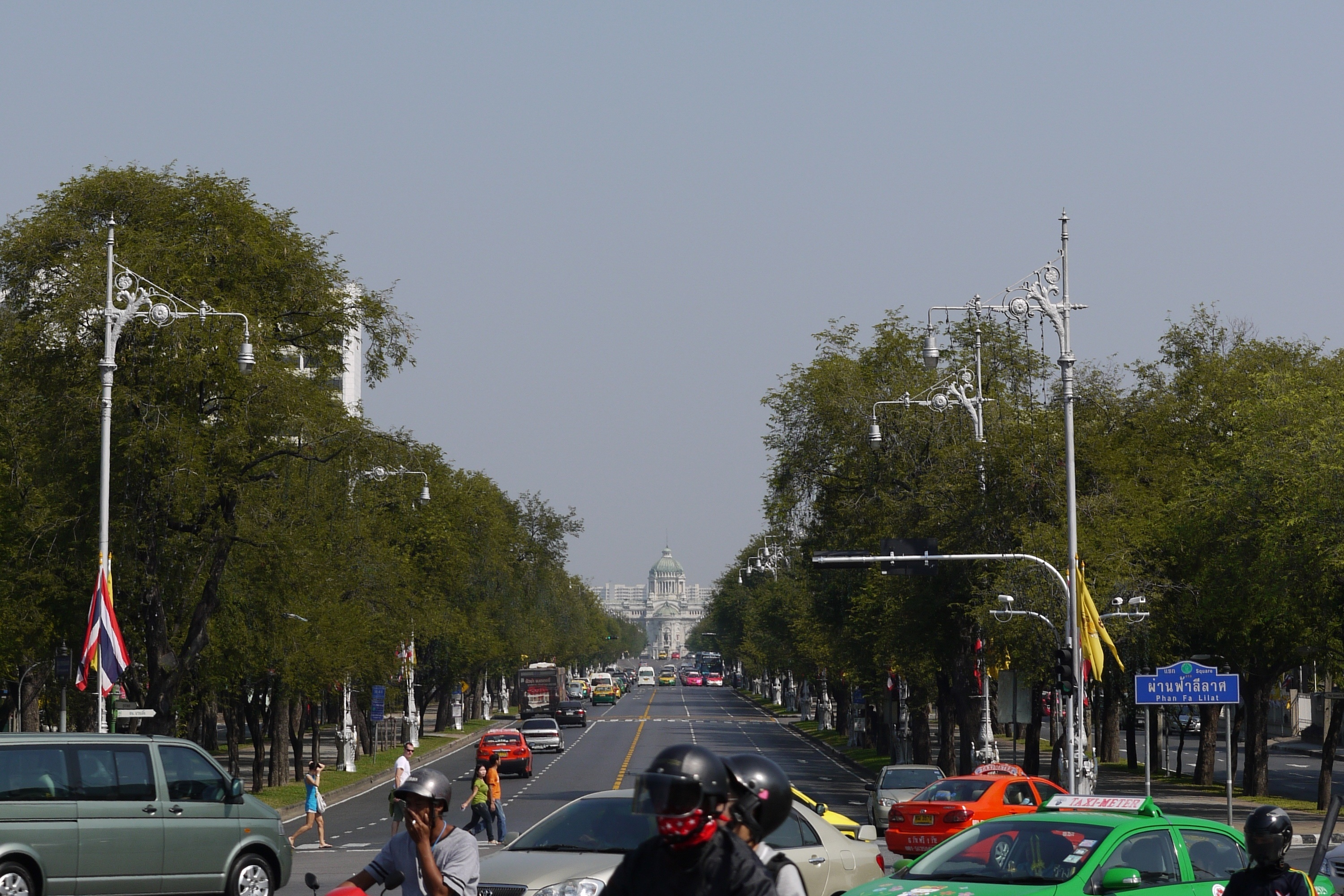
Outer Ratchadamnoen Avenue in the phase of the foot of Phan Fa Lilat Bridge (left: Ban Phan Thom, right: Wat Sommanat, Pom Prap Sattru Phai with Royal Plaza and Ananta Samakhom Throne Hall in the distance).

- Ministry of Agriculture and Cooperatives
- Ratchadamnoen Avenue (section outer Ratchadamnoen)
- Wat Pari Nayok Worawihan
- Wat Tri Thotsathep Worawihan
- Wat Mai Armataros
- Phra Sumen Road
- Sam Sen Road
- King Taksin Shrine
- Chao Pho Nu Shrine
- Khlong Bang Lamphu
- Phan Fa Lilat Bridge
