= Chakkapan Phewngam =

Thai politician

- จักกพันธุ์ ผิวงาม

Deputy Governor of Bangkok
- In office 1 June 2022 – 18 May 2026 Serving with Wisanu Subsompon, Sanon Wangsrangboon, and Tavida Kamolvej
- Governor: Chadchart Sittipunt
- In office 18 October 2016 – 21 July 2019
- Governor: Aswin Kwanmuang

Chakkapan Phewngam (Thai: จักกพันธุ์ ผิวงาม) is a Thai politician and local government officer currently serving as a Deputy Governor of Bangkok. Chakkapan previously served as Deputy Governor under Aswin Kwanmuang until his resignation in 2019 and as Deputy Permanent Secretary for BMA.

== Career ==
Chakkapan is charged with managing the Bangkok Metropolitan Administration's finances.
