= Navamindradhiraj University =

University in Thailand

- มหาวิทยาลัยนวมินทราธิราช
- Former name: University of Bangkok Metropolis
- Motto: "Vijjā Uppattaṃ Seṭṭha" (Pāḷi) ("Of all things that have come to pass, knowledge is the most excellent")
- Type: Autonomous public university
- Established: November 13, 2010
- Chairperson: Professor Suraphol Nitikraipot, PhD.
- President: Associate Professor Anant Manomaipiboon, MD.
- Royal conferrer: Maha Chakri Sirindhorn, Princess Royal of Thailand on behalf of the King
- Location: 131/6 Khao Road, Dusit, Bangkok, Thailand
- Campus: Urban
- Colors: Dark Green
- Nickname: NMU
- Website: www.nmu.ac.th
- 13°46′50″N 100°30′33″E

Navamindradhiraj University (NMU) (Thai: มหาวิทยาลัยนวมินทราธิราช; RTGS: Mahawitthayalai Nawaminthrathirat), formerly University of Bangkok Metropolis (Thai: มหาวิทยาลัยกรุงเทพมหานคร; RTGS: Mahawitthayalai Krung Thep Maha Nakhon), is a public university located in Bangkok, Thailand. The university focuses on medical science and public services such as medicine.

== History ==
From 2000 to 2004, Samak Sundaravej, the Governor of Bangkok, got the idea to establish the Bangkok Metropolitan Administration's (BMA) own university specialized for urban management. However, his idea was not accepted then. The idea of establishing BMA's own university was revived when Apirak Kosayodhin became the next Governor of Bangkok. At that time, BMA held two higher educational institutions: BMA Medical College and Vajira Hospital, and Kuakarun College of Nursing, but neither of these institutions had official higher education institute status and thus could not grant their own certificate. Both colleges' graduates were granted degrees by Mahidol University.

The "Bangkok Metropolitan Administration Autonomous University Act B.E. ..." draft was submitted to the cabinet in June 2007. In 2009, the cabinet then passed "University of Bangkok Metropolis Act" draft further to the parliament whose approved the university act draft in February 2010. The University of Bangkok Metropolis (UBM) (Thai: มหาวิทยาลัยกรุงเทพมหานคร) was officially enacted as the university act was published in the Royal Thai Government Gazette on November 12, 2010, which was effective on the next day.

According to the university act, the University of Bangkok Metropolis is an autonomous university funded by BMA and supervised without direct control by both BMA and Ministry of Education. Two higher institutions under BMA, BMA Medical College and Vajira Hospital and Kuakarun College of Nursing, were transformed to the Faculty of Medicine Vajira Hospital and Kuakarun Faculty of Nursing, respectively. The university missions are to educate, promote academic, research, construct and develop advanced academic and profession, propagate knowledge, provide medical service, promote public health, urban management, local administration, metropolitan development, as well as support religion, arts, culture, environment, and sports.

In 2011, His Majesty King Bhumibol Adulyadej gave the permission to use the university name as Navamindradhiraj University (NMU), meaning the ninth monarch, referring to his majesty himself. The bill to change university name was enacted on June 21, 2013.

In 2013, NMU received the Bangkok Community College from Ministry of Education as Urban Community College of Bangkok, which later renamed to Urban Community Development College, and also received Institute of Metropolitan Development from BMA, providing programs that serve urbanized society needs.

NMU expanded their coverage focusing on programs with the shortage of personnels, the urgent need of the country and also non-redundancy from other universities. NMU, by Faculty of Medicine Vajira Hospital, started bachelor's degree program in paramedicine in 2014 providing emergency personnel in emergency medical services for BMA and also Ministry of Public Health. With the expansion of NMU, the Faculty of Science and Health Technology was later established in 2017 providing the various programs in allied health sciences and also instructing students the foundation year.

== Academic Infrastructure ==
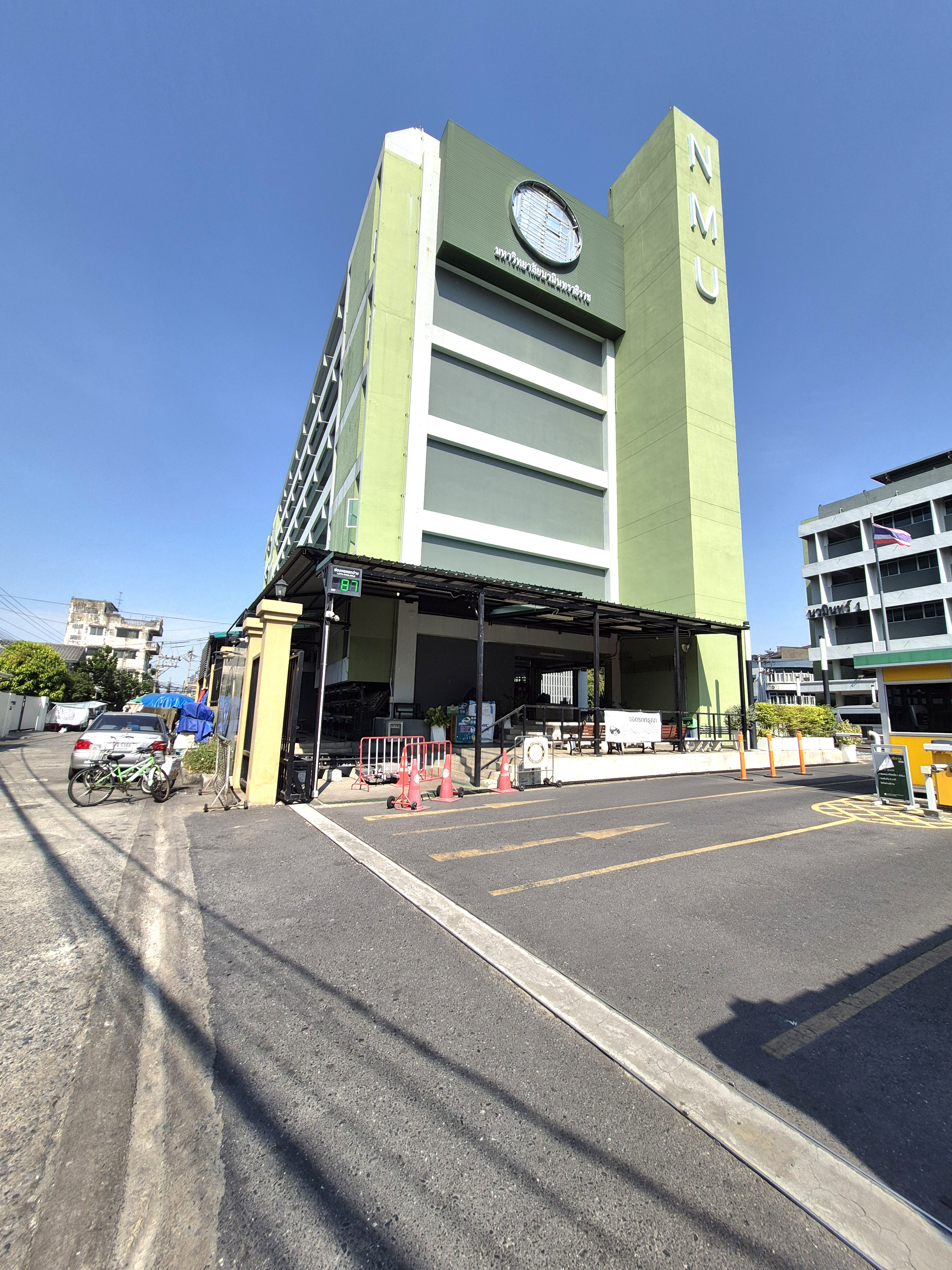
A building of Navamindradhiraj University in 2026.

- Faculty of Medicine Vajira Hospital
- Kuakarun Faculty of Nursing
- Faculty of Sciences and Health Technology
- Urban Community Development College
- Institute of Metropolitan Development

== Programs Available ==
Undergraduate	Post-graduate
Doctor of Medicine (M.D.) Bachelor of Arts (B.A.): Service Innovation; Early Childhood Development; Bachelor of Technology (B.Tech.): Facility Maintenance; Railway Maintenance; Bachelor of Management (B.M.): Facility Management; Bachelor of Nursing (B.N.S.) Bachelor of Public Administration (B.P.A): Urban Administration and Management; Bachelor of Science (B.Sc.): Disaster Management; Medical Instruments and Operating Room Technology; Paramedicine; Radiological Technology; Occupational Health and Hospital Safety	Master of Nursing (M.N.S): Adult and Elderly Nursing; Master of Public Administration: Sustainable Metropolitan Development and Management; Master of Science (M.Sc.): Urban Development and Management; Urban Disease Control and Prevention; Residency and Fellowship Training
