= Department of Public Works and Town & Country Planning =

Public works and town planning agency of Thailand

- กรมโยธาธิการและผังเมือง

Agency overview
- Preceding agencies: Department of Public Work; Department of Town and Country Planning
- Jurisdiction: Thailand
- Headquarters: 224 Rama 9 Huai Khwang, Bangkok; 218/1 Rama 6 Phaya Thai, Bangkok
- Employees: 1,780
- Annual budget: THB 34,838 million
- Agency executive: Director-General, Pongrat Piromrat
- Parent agency: Ministry of Interior
- Website: https://www.dpt.go.th

The Department of Public Works and Town & Country Planning, DPT, is an organization which combined of the Department of Public Work and the Department of Town and Country Planning as an agency of the Thai Ministry of Interior.

== Background of establishment ==
The Department of Public Works (DP) was established in 1889.

Three years after the Siamese revolution of 1932, in 1935, Phraya Pakit Kolasart, Chief Engineer, started the Town Planning Division (TPD) under Luang Burakam Kowit (หลวงบุรกรรมโกวิท) of the Department of Public Work (DP). In 1937, the TPD was briefly promoted to Department status, but in 1942, the TPD was demoted back to a Division and changed to the Technical and Town Planning Division. In 1944, the TPD re-established as a Division within the Department of Public and Municipal Works, which was placed under the Prime Minister.

In 1961, the DP led by Luang Yuktasevi Vivat proposed policies to Sarit cabinet, firstly, to implement land use planning for Bangkok and Thonburi, secondly, to promote the TPD from Division to Department. The Department of Town and Country Planning (DT) quickly established in 1962 with only eleven employees transferred from Bangkok and Thonburi municipalities and Public Works Department Town Planning Office.

The DT started to design the planning throughout the nation in 2002, which concerned only at regional level to provincial level. Local area such as municipality or sub-district level were ignored.

Due to the government's policy of bureaucratic restructuring in 2002, the DP and DT were combined into the Department of Public Works and Town & Country Planning (DPT).

The DPT is tasked with reviewing the Bangkok Comprehensive Plan (BCT).
