= Wisanu Subsompon =

Thai academic and politician

- วิศณุ ทรัพย์สมพล

Deputy Governor of Bangkok
- Incumbent
- Assumed office 1 June 2022 Serving with Sanon Wangsrangboon, Chakkapan Phewngam (2022–2026), Tavida Kamolvej and Pornphrom Vikitset (2026–present)
- Governor: Chadchart Sittipunt

Personal details
- Education: Chulalongkorn University (BEng); Carnegie Mellon University (MEng, PhD)

Wisanu Subsompon (Thai: วิศณุ ทรัพย์สมพล, RTGS: Wisanu Sapsomphon) is a Thai academic and politician, currently serving as a Deputy Governor of Bangkok. Prior to his appointment, Wisanu was Vice President for Property and Physical Management a Chulalongkorn University and an associate professor of civil engineering.

== Early life and education ==
Wisanu received a bachelors of engineering from Chulalongkorn University, and an MS and Ph.D in civil engineering from Carnegie Mellon University.

== Career ==
Wisanu is charged with Bangkok Metropolitan Administration (BMA) infrastructure, water drainage and traffic. He has helped to coordinate emergency preparation and response to flooding in Bangkok, including from Typhoon Noru. Wisanu has overseen the drafting of the Bangkok Comprehensive Plan's fourth revision, due to be released in mid-2027.
