= Sanon Wangsrangboon =

Thai politician

- ศานนท์ หวังสร้างบุญ

Deputy Governor of Bangkok
- Incumbent
- Assumed office 1 June 2022 Serving with Wisanu Subsompon, Chakkapan Phewngam (2022–2026), Tavida Kamolvej and Pornphrom Vikitset (2026–present)
- Governor: Chadchart Sittipunt

Personal details
- Born: 10 October 1989 (age 37) Bangkok, Thailand
- Spouse: Jitchanok Tahwichai (m. 2020)
- Children: 1
- Education: Chulalongkorn University (BEng)

Sanon Wangsrangboon (Thai: ศานนท์ หวังสร้างบุญ; RTGS: Sanon Wangsangbun; born 10 October 1989) is a Thai social entrepreneur and politician who served as a Deputy Governor of the Bangkok Metropolitan Administration (BMA) from 2022 to 2026. Appointed by Governor Chadchart Sittipunt, he was the youngest deputy governor in Bangkok's history. During his tenure, his portfolio included education, social development, and cultural policy in Bangkok.

== Early life and education ==
The eldest of four children, Sanon completed his secondary education at Saint Gabriel's College and graduated from Chulalongkorn University with a Bachelor of Engineering degree. During his studies, he served as the president of the university's student union in 2010.

== Career ==
After working as an industrial engineer for five years, Sanon co-founded several social enterprises focused on urban development, including the Mayday transit advocacy group and Trawell. He previously campaigned against evictions in the Mahakan Fort community.

=== Deputy Governor of Bangkok ===
Sanon was appointed Deputy Governor of Bangkok on 1 June 2022 by Governor Chadchart Sittipunt. His portfolio included education, social development, and cultural policy.

In education policy, Sanon worked on reforms for schools under the Bangkok Metropolitan Administration (BMA). Reported policies under his remit included easing strict school uniform and hairstyle rules, providing free sanitary pads to students, improving teacher welfare, and expanding access to computers for students. He also supported opening BMA schools outside regular hours for recreation and community use, and was involved in a project to provide reconditioned laptops linked to Google Classroom across 437 BMA schools.

His social development work included policies concerning homeless people, child development, and youth participation in city policy. Sanon described homeless people as a vulnerable group requiring assistance, and the BMA worked with non-governmental organizations on temporary drop-in shelters and measures to reduce employment barriers for newly homeless people. He also supported the creation of a youth council and efforts to bring unregistered childcare centres in low-income communities into the BMA subsidy system.

Sanon was also associated with the BMA's open-data, public-space, and cultural initiatives. These included the Open Bangkok Data Project, which published city data on issues such as accident locations and air quality, and the "12 Months 12 Festivals" or "Colorful Bangkok" campaign, which promoted cultural and neighbourhood events in the city.

Sanon's tenure as deputy governor ended on 18 May 2026, when Chadchart resigned as Bangkok governor, a move that also ended the tenure of the BMA's political executive team, including the deputy governors, advisers, and secretaries.

== Personal life ==
Sanon married Jitchanok Tahwichai in November 2020. A Thammasat University graduate, Jitchanok is an organic farmer who founded the "Piang Por Suk" agricultural learning center and operates hospitality businesses, including a resort and a cafe, in Loei province. They have one child.

== Royal decorations ==
- 2025 – Knight Commander (Second Class) of the Order of the Crown of Thailand
- 2023 – Commander (Third Class) of the Order of the White Elephant
