= Kuakarun Faculty of Nursing, Navamindradhiraj University =

Nursing school in Bangkok, Thailand

- คณะพยาบาลศาสตร์เกื้อการุณย์ มหาวิทยาลัยนวมินทราธิราช
- Former names: Kuakarun College of Nursing
- Type: Public
- Established: 1954
- Location: Dusit, Bangkok, Thailand
- Campus: Urban
- Affiliated Hospital: Vajira Hospital
- Colors: } White
- Website: www.kcn.ac.th

The Kuakarun Faculty of Nursing (Thai: คณะพยาบาลศาสตร์เกื้อการุณย์; RTGS: Kuea Karun–) is a nursing school situated in Bangkok, Thailand. It is established by the Bangkok Metropolitan Administration (BMA), now it is a founding faculty of the recently founded University of Bangkok Metropolis (Navamindradhiraj University).

== History ==
The History of the Kuakarun began when Vajira Hospital Nursing School (Thai: โรงเรียนพยาบาลผดุงครรภ์และอนามัยวชิรพยาบาล) was established in 1954, by the BMA Medical Department, centered in Vajira Hospital, in action to solve an insufficiency of nurses deployed in Bangkok's hospitals and health centers. Later on, in 1970 BMA opened their second nursing school, stationed at BMA's General Hospital, called the General Hospital Nursing School (Thai: โรงเรียนพยาบาลโรงพยาบาลกลาง).

In 1976 these two nursing schools merged in to a single institution renamed as the Kuakarun College of Nursing, named by H.M. the King Bhumibol Adulyadej. The new college is headquartered at the old Vajira Hospital Nursing School, but the campus has been renewed and expanded in time, to become one of the county's leading nursing schools today.

In early times the Kuakarun College of Nursing has been an affiliated institute of Srinakharinwirot University but has changed in 1993, after the BMA Medical College was founded, to be affiliated with Mahidol University. After the establishment of Navamindradhiraj University in 2010, the college was transferred to Navamindradhiraj University, and no longer affiliated to Mahidol University.

== See also ==
Vajira Hospital
Navamindradhiraj University
Faculty of Medicine Vajira Hospital
