= Second Bangkok City Hall =

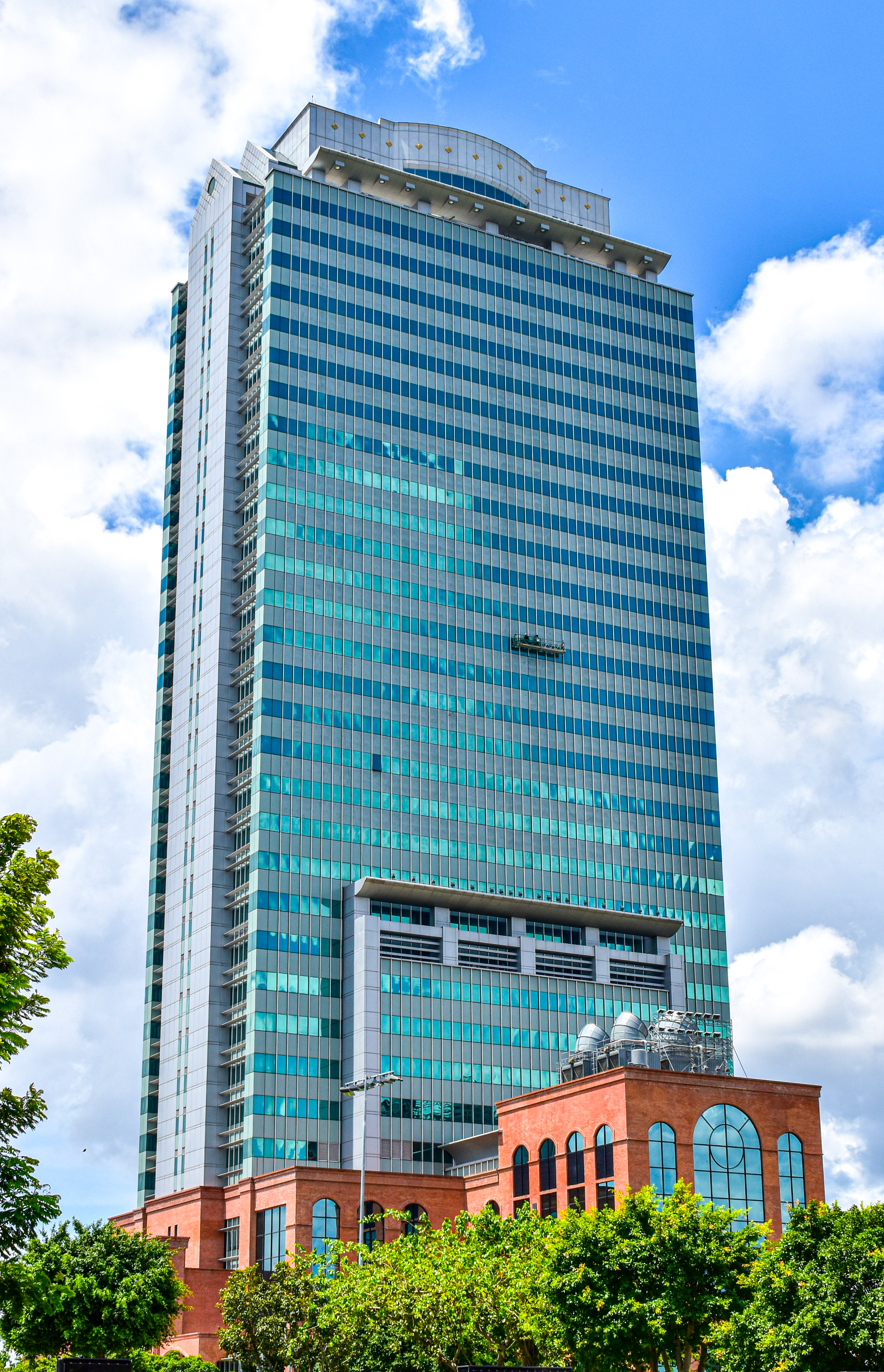
- ศาลาว่าการกรุงเทพมหานคร 2 Bangkok Second City Hall located in Din Daeng District.

General information
- Location: 111 Mit Maitri Road, Din Daeng District, Bangkok, Thailand
- Opened: 2017
- Owner: Bangkok Metropolitan Administration

Height
- Height: 160 m (525 ft)

Technical details
- Floor count: 37

The Second Bangkok City Hall (Thai: ศาลาว่าการกรุงเทพมหานคร 2), commonly known as Bangkok City Hall 2, is the secondary headquarters of the Bangkok Metropolitan Administration (BMA) in Din Daeng district, Bangkok. It is currently the meeting place for the Bangkok Metropolitan Council.

== History ==
The Second Bangkok City Hall opened in 2017.

In 2022, Governor-elect Chadchart Sittipunt announced plans to transform the First Bangkok City Hall into a museum and creative area, and move all BMA operations to the Second Bangkok City Hall.
