= Dinso Road =

Road in Bangkok, Thailand

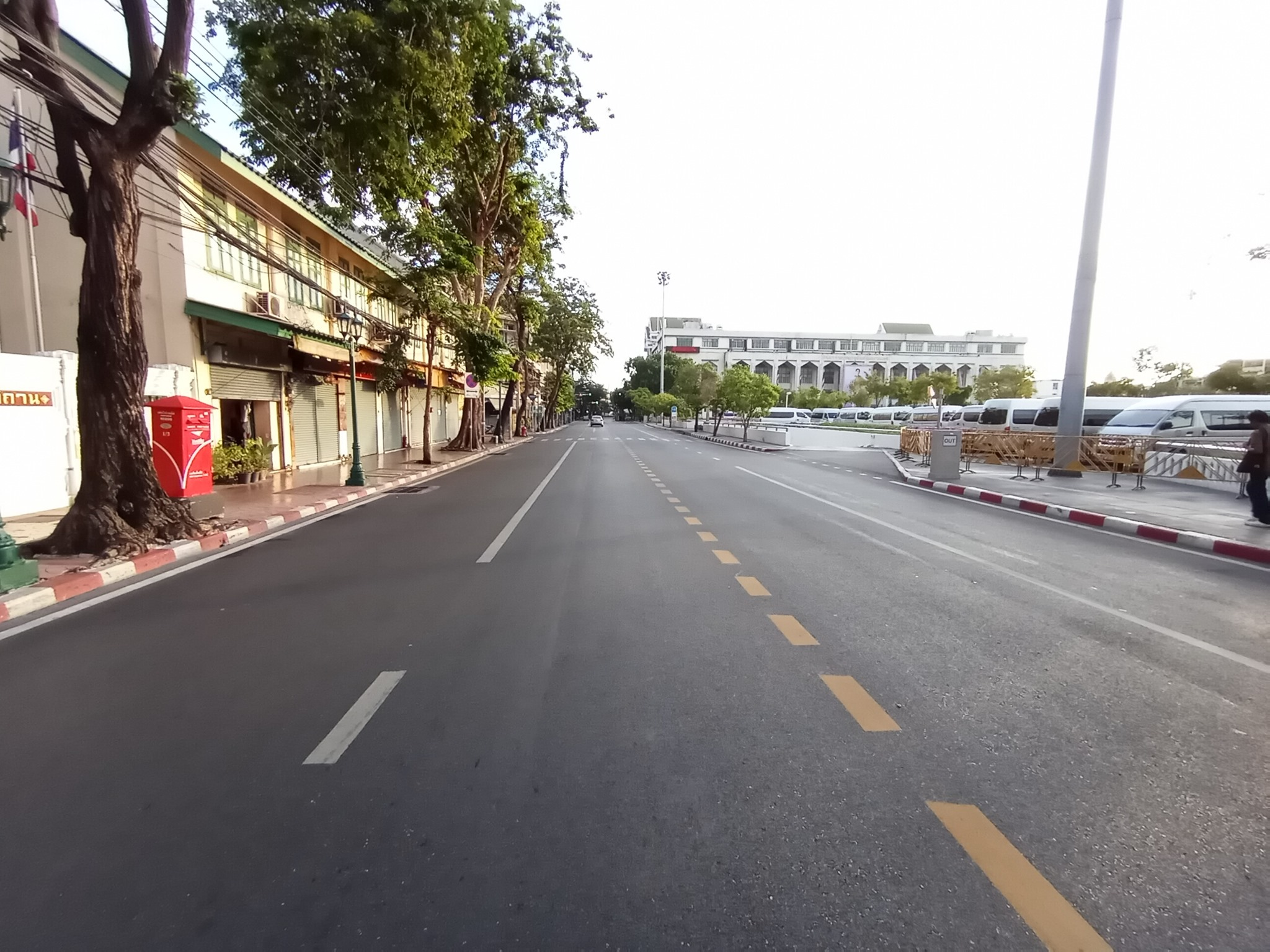
- Dinso Road in front of Devasathan looks towards Bangkok City Hall and Democracy Monument
- Interactive map of Dinso Road
- Native name: ถนนดินสอ
- Former name: Ban Dinso Road
- Namesake: Yan Pa Dinso
- Length: 850 m (2,790 ft)
- Location: Phra Nakhon, Bangkok, Thailand
- Coordinates: 13°45′20″N 100°30′04″E
- Southwest end: Sao Chingcha
- Northeast end: Chaloem Wan Chat Intersection

Dinso Road (Thai: ถนนดินสอ, RTGS: Thanon Dinso, pronounced [tʰā.nǒn dīn.sɔ̌ː], lit. 'pencil road') is a road in the area of Rattanakosin Island, or Bangkok's old town zone. It begins at the corner of the Giant Swing, where Bamrung Mueang and Ti Thong Roads meet in front of the Devasathan, and runs past the side of Bangkok City Hall, parallel to Siriphong Road. It then cuts across Ratchadamnoen Avenue at the Democracy Monument, passing Satriwitthaya School and Wat Bowonniwet School in the Bang Lamphu area. The road comes to an end at the foot of Wan Chat Bridge, where it intersects with Phra Sumen Road and Prachathipatai Road, covering a total length of 850 m (0.5 mi). The latter section operates as a one-way street.

Historically, the area surrounding Dinso Road was home to a community of pencil-makers whose origins date back to the Ayutthaya period, during which the area was known as Yan Pa Dinso (Thai: ย่านป่าดินสอ, lit. 'pencil forestland'). In addition to pencils, they also produced white clay filler, which is also referred to in Thai as "dinso".

Construction of Dinso Road began in 1898 and was completed the following year, during the reign of King Chulalongkorn (Rama V). The road was built to accommodate the city’s growing traffic and was originally named Ban Dinso Road (Thai: ถนนบ้านดินสอ, lit. 'pencil house road'). The King presided over the official opening ceremony on 15 November 1899.

Like many roads in the area, modern-day Dinso Road is lined with restaurants, bookshops, milk cafés, sweet shops, and hostels. Several of these establishments have been recognised in the Michelin Guide's Bib Gourmand list since 2019.
