= Phra Sumen Road =

Road in Bangkok, Thailand

Coordinates: 13.760292°N 100.500432°E

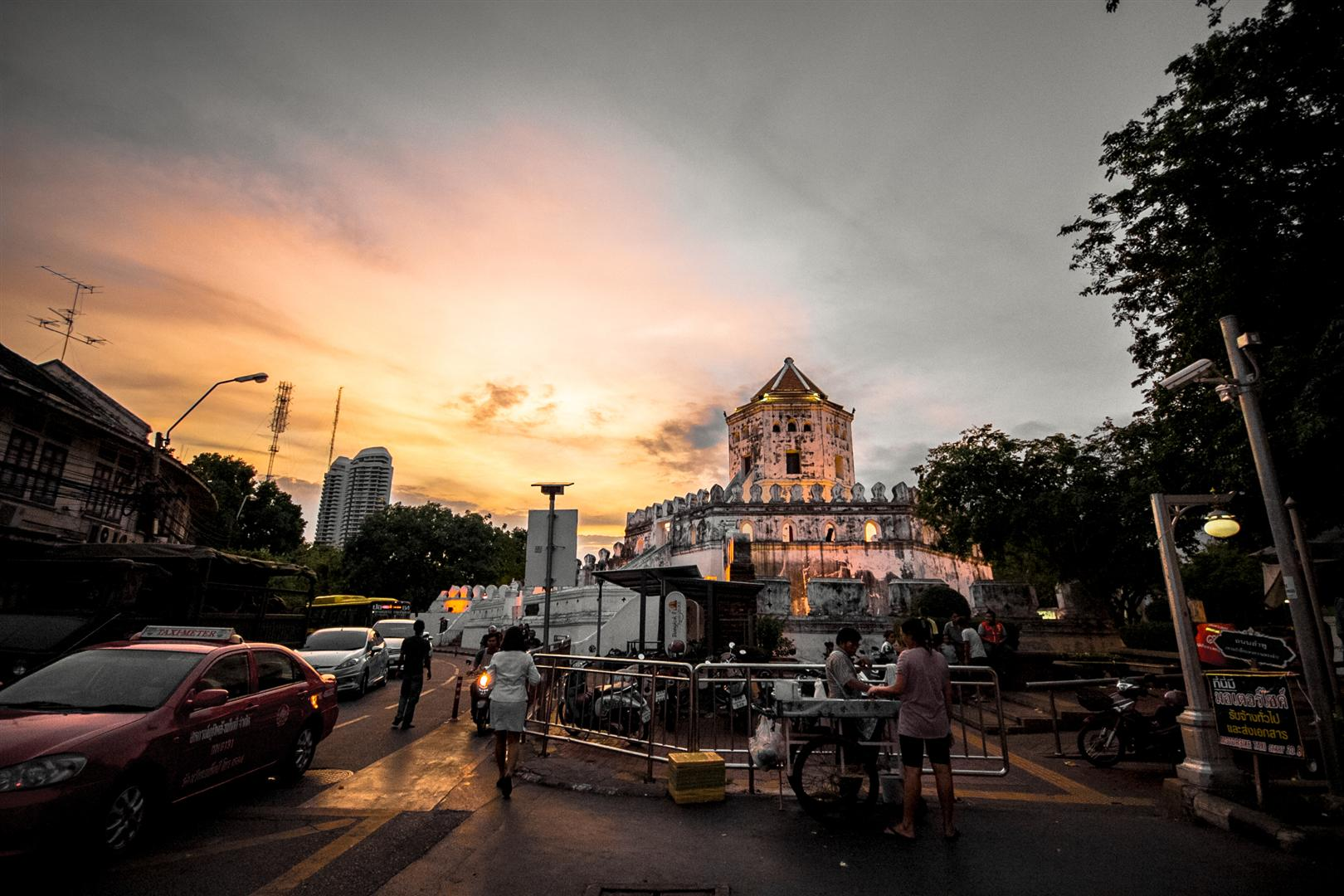
Phra Sumen Fort and Phra Sumen Road

Phra Sumen Road (Thai: ถนนพระสุเมรุ, RTGS: Thanon Phra Sumen, pronounced [tʰa.nǒn pʰráʔ sù.meː.ruː]) is a 1.3 km (0.8 mi) road running through Bangkok's old town, known as Rattanakosin Island. It was named after Phra Sumen Fort, which was built during the reign of King Rama I (Buddha Yodfa Chulaloke), who established Bangkok as the capital in 1782. In accordance with royal customs, a total of 14 citadel forts were constructed. Only two remain today: Mahakan Fort and Phra Sumen Fort.

The road begins at Phra Sumen Fort, continuing from Phra Athit Road along the bank of the Chao Phraya River. It follows Khlong Rop Krung through the city until it reaches the foot of Phan Fa Lilat Bridge, where it joins Ratchadamnoen Avenue opposite Mahakan Fort. This connection to Phra Sumen Fort gave the road its name.

One of the highlights of Phra Sumen Road is the number of important historical structures found on both sides. At the Phra Sumen Fort end stands the old Kurusapa Printing House, also known as Wat Sangwet Printer School. It was the first institution in Thailand to teach the art of printing. Its façade has been restored and now houses Pipit Banglamphu, a museum that presents the history and way of life of the Bang Lamphu community. On the opposite side are the remains of an old palace gate, visible as dilapidated brick walls between shophouses. Nearby is a shrine containing an image of Prince Jakjesada, a half-brother of King Rama I, who once had a residence in this area.

The shophouses along Phra Sumen Road today feature chic restaurants and cafés, as well as art galleries and bookstores. The road runs through Bang Lamphu, a historic commercial district long known among Thais as a centre for garment trading, especially school uniforms. In modern times, Bang Lamphu has become globally recognized as a hub for budget accommodation and a gathering place for foreign tourists, also home to the famous Khaosan Road.

Phra Sumen Road also passes by Wat Bowonniwet, the principal Buddhist temple of the Dhammayuttika Nikāya order. Next to it lies the neighbourhood of Saphan Wan Chat, where a bridge crosses Khlong Rop Krung (Bang Lamphu section). At the southwestern foot of the bridge are old shophouses that were once part of a bustling trading area. Shops here still sell items such as national flags, flagpoles, royal emblems, royal portraits, and various symbols. On the opposite side stand the old city walls and the outer city gate, which is covered in bricks and cement. The gate has a sculpted cement arbor that has been preserved in good condition.

The road continues until it reaches the front of the Queen Sirikit Gallery, near the Phan Fa Branch of Bangkok Bank, where it terminates.

== Gallery ==
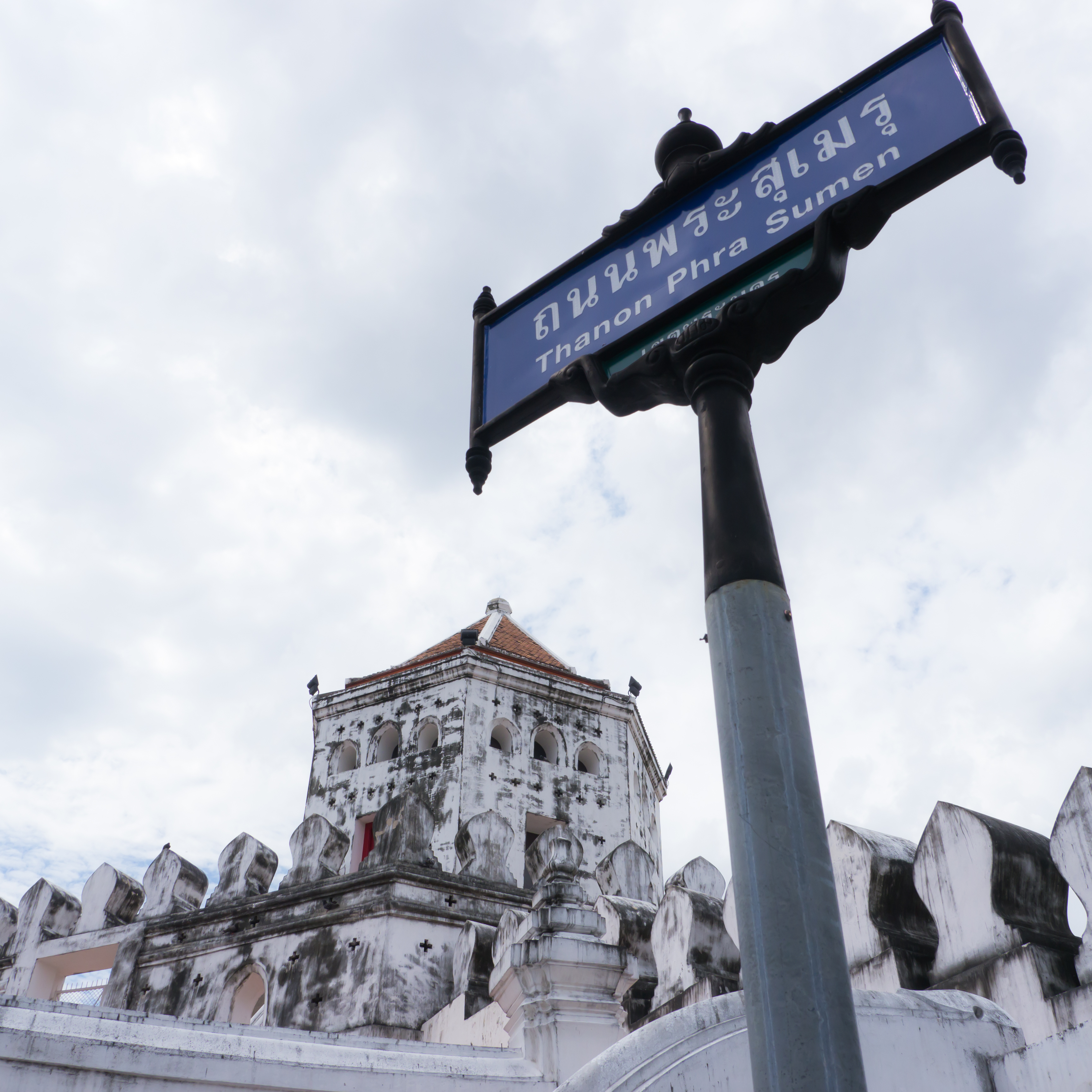
Sign of the road

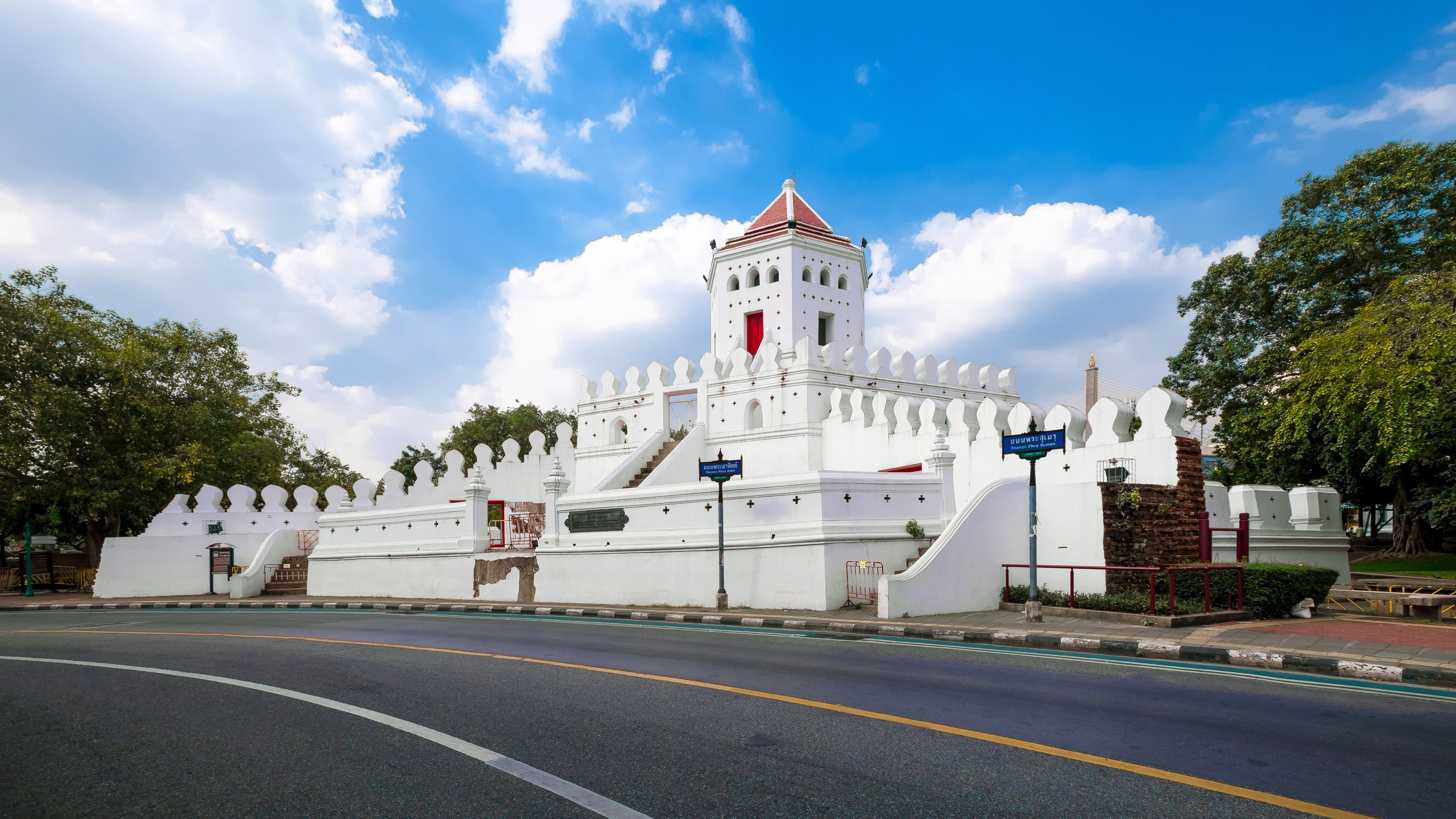
The fort and the road at noon

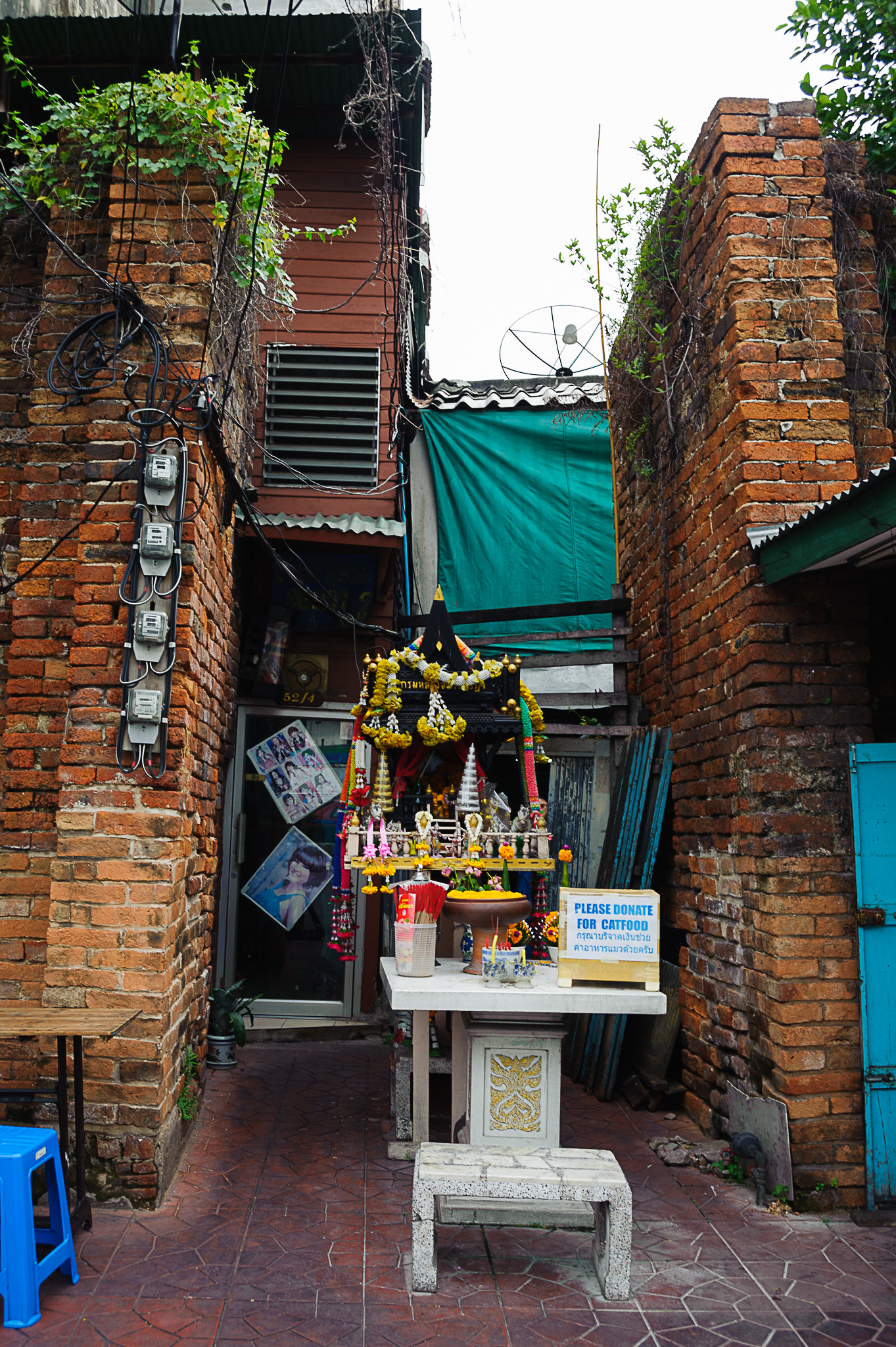
Remnants of a palace gate and shrine dedicated to Prince Jakjesada

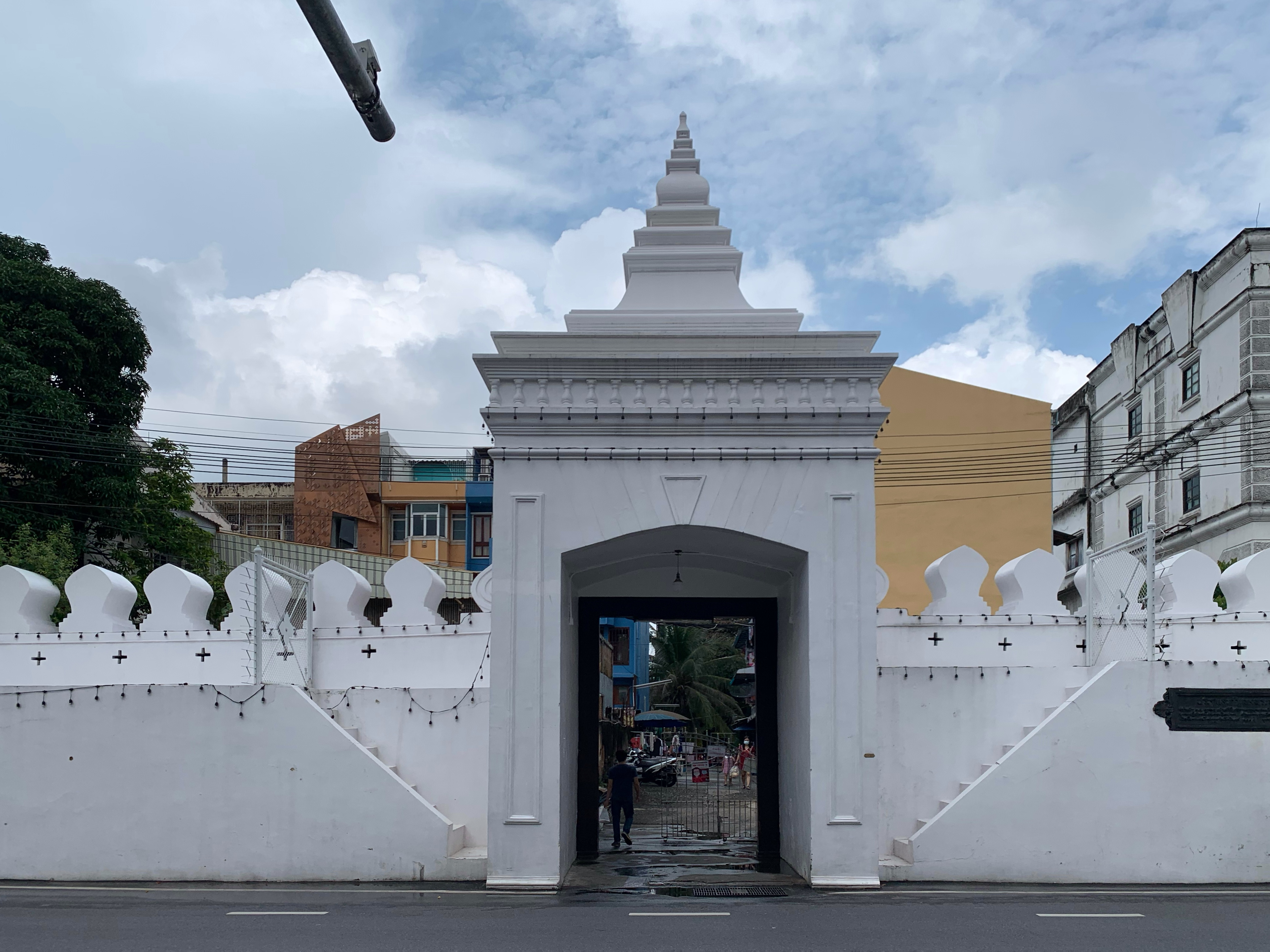
The city wall remnants near Wat Bowonniwet

== See also ==
- History of Bangkok
- Fortifications of Bangkok
