= Nakhon Pathom Hospital =

Nakhon Pathom Hospital โรงพยาบาลนครปฐม
- The Ministry of Public Health Health District 5

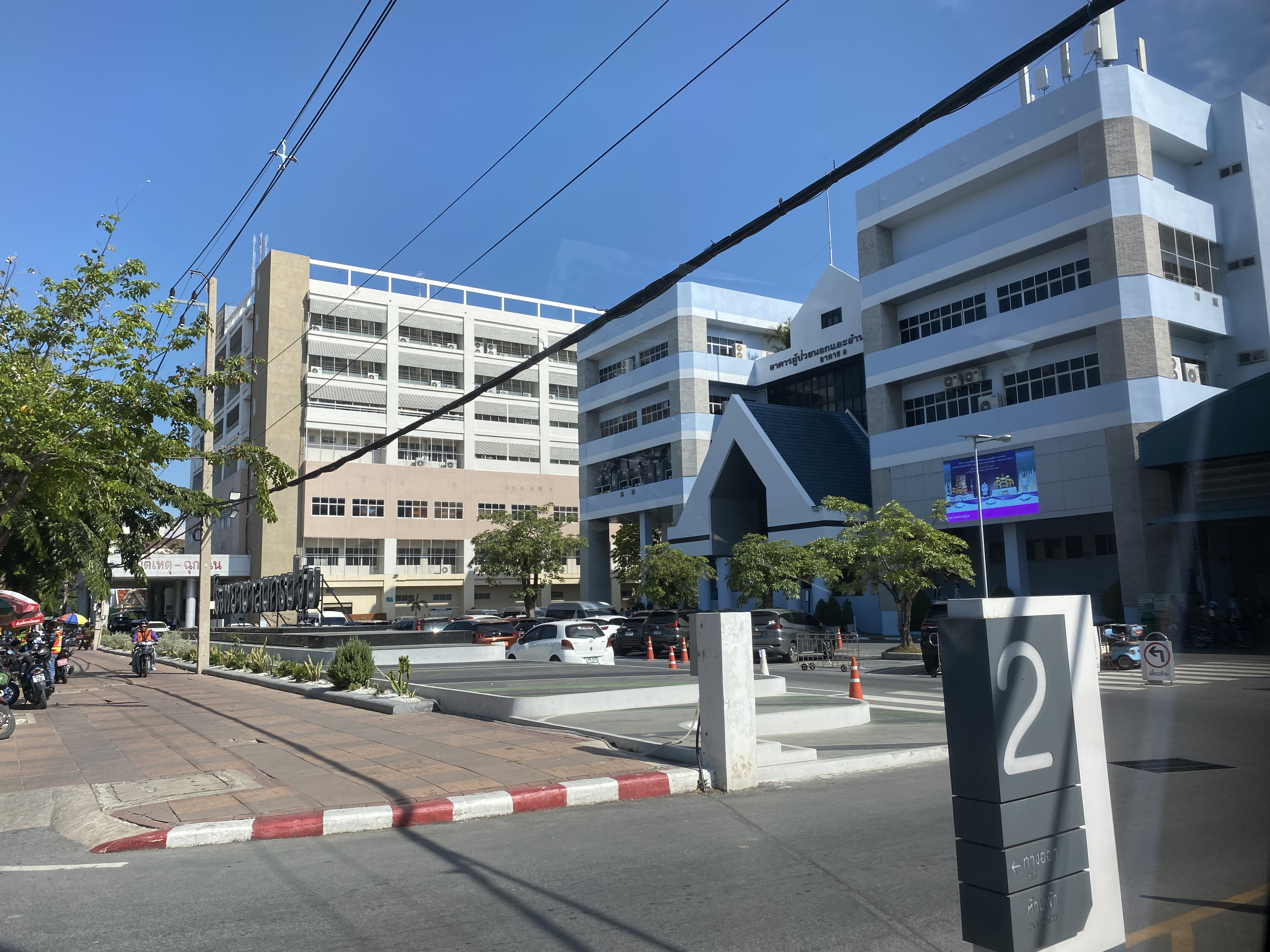

Geography
- Location: 196 Tesa Road, Phra Pathom Chedi Subdistrict, Mueang Nakhon Pathom District, Nakhon Pathom 73000, Thailand
- Coordinates: 13.819170°N 100.075203°E

Organisation
- Type: Regional
- Affiliated university: Princess Srisavangavadhana College of Medicine; Faculty of Medicine Siriraj Hospital, Mahidol University; Faculty of Medicine Vajira Hospital, Navamindradhiraj University

Services
- Beds: 860

History
- Founded: 11 March 1966

Links
- Website: www.nkpthospital.go.th
- Lists: Hospitals in Thailand

Nakhon Pathom Hospital (Thai: โรงพยาบาลนครปฐม) is the main public hospital of Nakhon Pathom Province, Thailand and is classified under the Ministry of Public Health as a regional hospital. It is an affiliated teaching hospital of the Faculty of Medicine Siriraj Hospital, Mahidol University and the Faculty of Medicine Vajira Hospital, Navamindradhiraj University.

== History ==
Initially, the first hospital in Nakhon Pathom was under the management of the Department of Medical Services of the Ministry of Public Health, known as Nakhon Pathom City Hospital. It opened in 1952 and was located on Lang Phra Road in a crowded community. Since space was very limited, expansion was made very difficult. Therefore, in 1962, Phon Wongsaroj, the governor of Nakhon Pathom decided to move the hospital to a better and more spacious location on Tesa Road. Construction was completed in 1966 and Nakhon Pathom Hospital was officially opened on 11 March 1966 by Prime Minister Thanom Kittikachorn.

== See also ==
- Healthcare in Thailand
- Hospitals in Thailand
- List of hospitals in Thailand
