= Tavida Kamolvej =

Thai academic and politician

- ทวิดา กมลเวชช

Deputy Governor of Bangkok
- Incumbent
- Assumed office 1 June 2022 Serving with Wisanu Subsompon, Chakkapan Phewngam (2022–2026), Sanon Wangsrangboon and Pornphrom Vikitset (2026–present)
- Governor: Chadchart Sittipunt

Personal details
- Born: 30 September 1972 (age 53) Lue Amnat, Amnat Charoen, Thailand
- Education: Thammasat University (BA, MPA); University of Pittsburgh (PhD)

Tavida Kamolvej (Thai: ทวิดา กมลเวชช, RTGS: Thawida Kamonwet; born 30 September 1972) is a Thai academic and politician who served as a deputy governor of Bangkok from 2022 to 2026. Prior to her appointment, she was an associate professor and the Dean of the Faculty of Political Science at Thammasat University. Tavida specializes in public policy and disaster risk management, particularly in disaster risk reduction and emergency response.

== Early life and education ==
Tavida was born on 30 September 1972. She is the daughter of Thaweesak Kamolvej, a former director of Phaya Thai district, a former member of the Bangkok Metropolitan Council for Bang Phlat district, and a former senior advisor to the Governor of Bangkok.

Tavida graduated with a bachelor's degree with first-class honors in 1994 and a master's degree in public administration in 1996 from the Faculty of Political Science, Thammasat University. Her interest in disaster risk reduction was sparked by the 2004 Indian Ocean earthquake and tsunami. She furthered her studies in the United States, obtaining a Graduate Certificate in Public Management from the University of South Florida and completing a Doctor of Philosophy (PhD) in Public Administration and Public Policy from the University of Pittsburgh in 2005.

== Career ==
Before entering politics, Tavida spent over two decades as an academic, beginning her teaching career at Thammasat University in 1998. Serving as the Dean of the Faculty of Political Science, Thammasat University from 2018 to 2022, she helped pioneer Thailand's first disaster studies curriculum and advised on national disaster risk reduction policies. She has also served as a risk management and disaster consultant for both Thai and international organizations.

In 2019, Tavida was appointed to a sub-committee of the Bangkok Metropolitan Administration Civil Service Commission. In 2020, the Thai Cabinet appointed her as a qualified member of the National Disaster Prevention and Mitigation Committee.

=== Deputy Governor of Bangkok ===
On 1 June 2022, she was appointed by Governor Chadchart Sittipunt as one of his four deputy governors. Given her extensive background, Tavida is specifically charged with overseeing disaster management, crisis response, and public health policies for the Bangkok Metropolitan Administration.

==== 2025 Earthquake response ====
In April 2025, Tavida coordinated the Bangkok Metropolitan Administration's rescue and recovery operations following the collapse of the under-construction Thailand State Audit Office headquarters. The collapse, triggered by a 7.7-magnitude earthquake in Myanmar, trapped over 100 construction workers. During an initial inspection of the disaster site by Prime Minister Paetongtarn Shinawatra and the news media, Tavida requested the entourage to maintain silence and remain in designated areas, citing the need for absolute quiet to allow rescue workers to detect acoustic signs of life from under the rubble.

As the salvage operation progressed throughout April, Tavida oversaw the debris removal and the search for missing victims. She stated that the building's tilt during the collapse concentrated casualties in specific stairwell zones, and coordinated with the Ministry of Foreign Affairs to secure DNA samples from relatives in Myanmar to identify missing migrant workers.

On 12 May 2025, Tavida announced the conclusion of the search and recovery mission at the site. Following final sweeps by K-9 units to ensure no missing persons remained, the site was officially closed and handed over to responsible authorities on 15 May, with a finalized death toll of 86 individuals.

== Royal decorations ==
- 2025 – Knight Grand Cross (First Class) of the Order of the White Elephant
- 2023 – Knight Grand Cross (First Class) of the Order of the Crown of Thailand
