= First Bangkok City Hall =

Coordinates: 13.7539°N 100.5018°E

- ศาลาว่าการ กทม.1
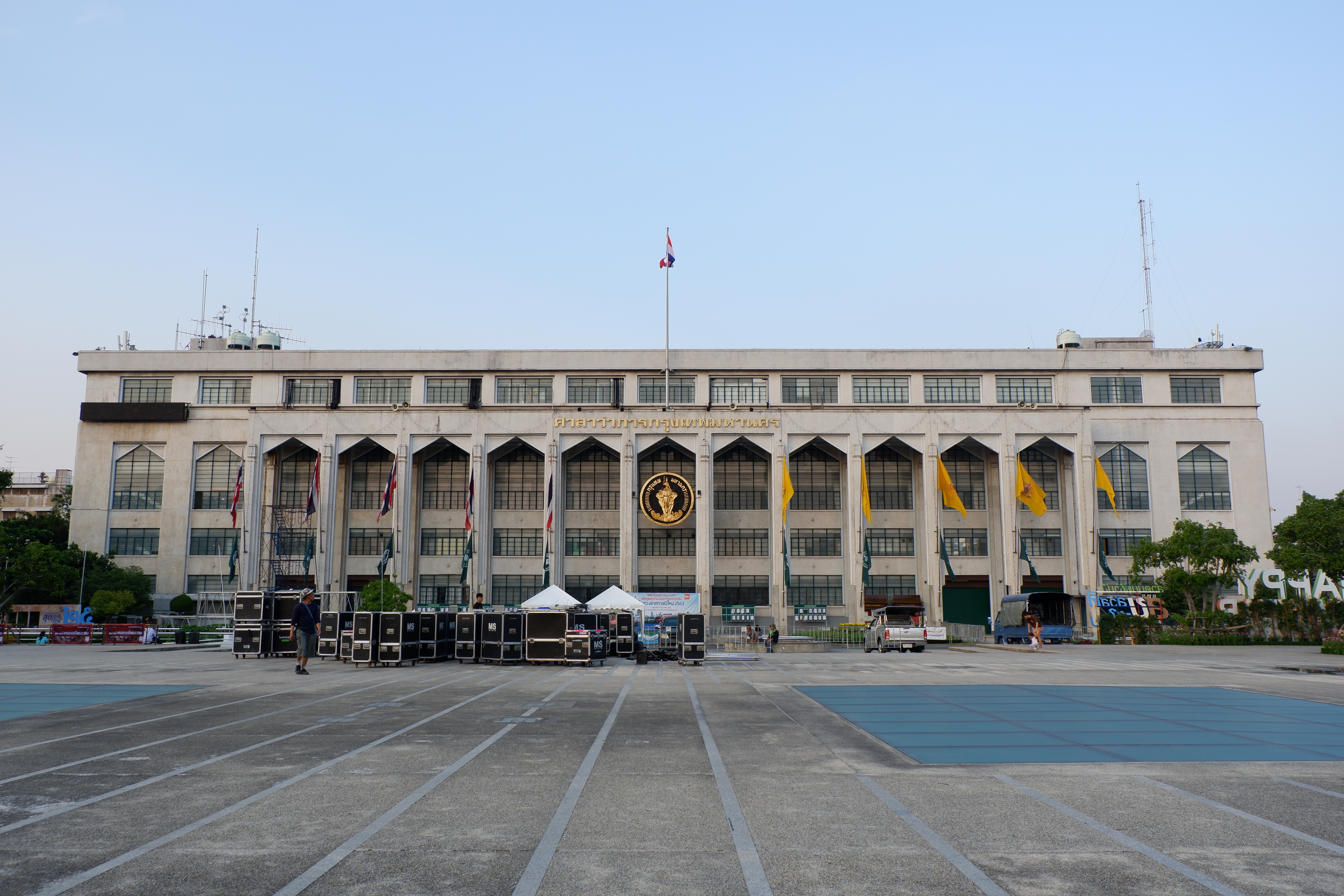

General information
- Location: 173 Dinso Road, Sao Chingcha Subdistrict, Phra Nakhon District, Bangkok, Thailand
- Owner: Bangkok Metropolitan Administration

The First Bangkok City Hall (Thai: ศาลาว่าการ กทม.1), commonly known as Bangkok City Hall (Thai: ศาลาว่าการกรุงเทพมหานคร), is the headquarters of the Bangkok Metropolitan Administration (BMA) in Phra Nakhon district, Bangkok, Thailand.

== History & design ==
The building's groundbreaking occurred on 24 June 1956. Originally, the site was a large open dirt field and served as the location of a market known as Sao Chingcha Market. Later, during the construction of the building, the market was relocated to its current site, now known as Trok Mo Market. The office was also moved from the area of what is now Saranrom Park.

The building was designed by Mom Chao Samai Chaloem Kridakorn, an architect from the Fine Arts Department. It is distinguished by its modern architectural style with Thai influences. It is a three-story building designed with consideration for a tropical climate, featuring wide balconies and an open, airy hall.

At the front, there is a black stone pillar inscribed with the full official name of Bangkok, which is recognized by the Guinness World Records as the longest city name in the world. It consists of 168 letters and 65 syllables. The monument was erected in 2002 to commemorate the 220th anniversary of Rattanakosin, present-day Bangkok.

== Lan Khon Mueang ==
In front of the building is a large open plaza covering 6,200 m^{2}, known as "Lan Khon Mueang" (Townspeople Plaza), which is used for various activities for example, it is used for announcing election results, hosting election campaign rallies and various public events. It is also temporarily used as a venue for enshrining the Phra Phuttha Sihing, the sacred Buddha image of Bangkok, so that people can pay their respects during important festivals such as New Year and Songkran, as a blessing for good fortune in life.

The plaza is also generally used as an open public space for exercise, walking, and relaxation. Beneath the plaza is an underground parking area along with public restroom facilities.

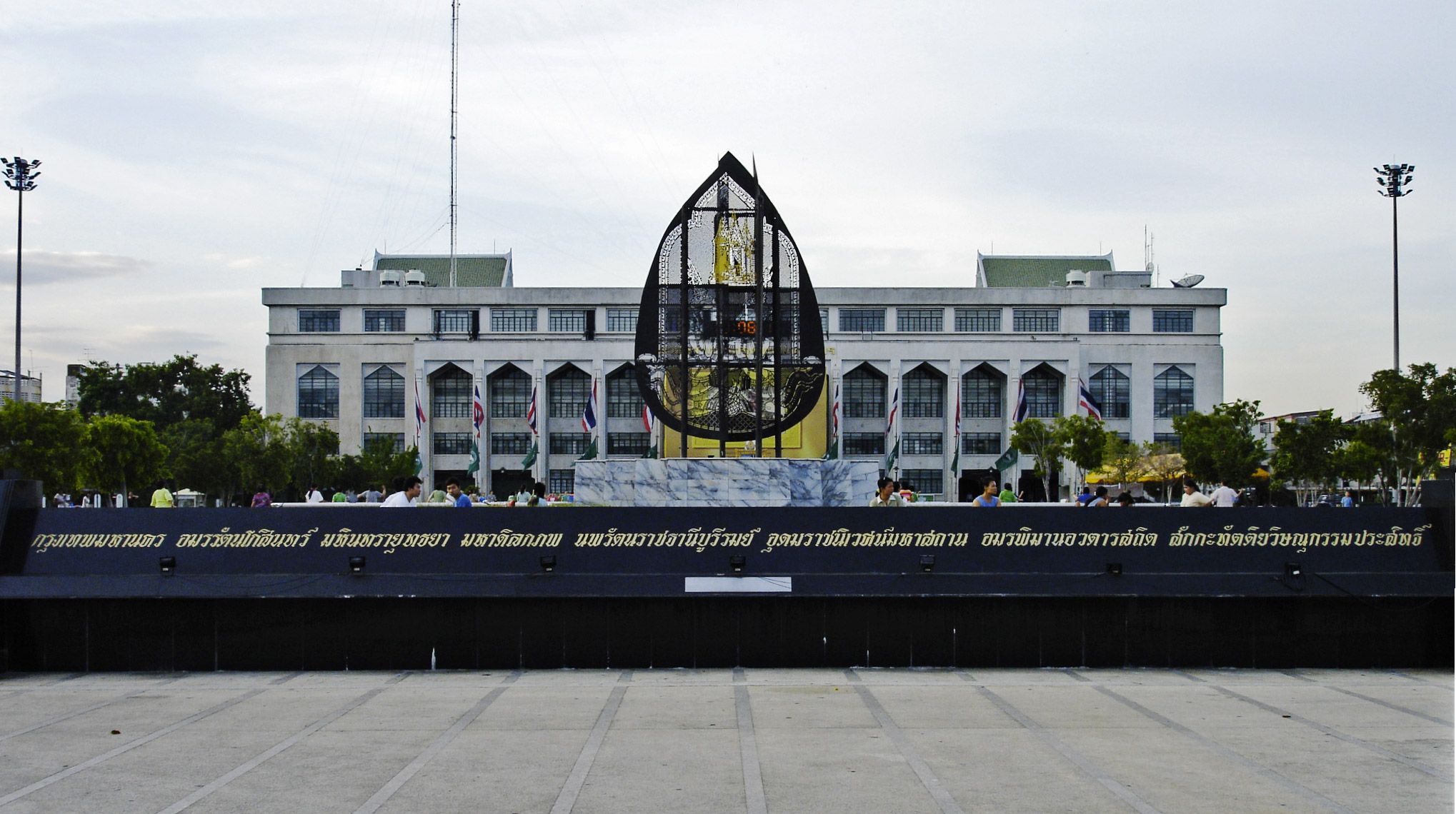
Full name of Bangkok

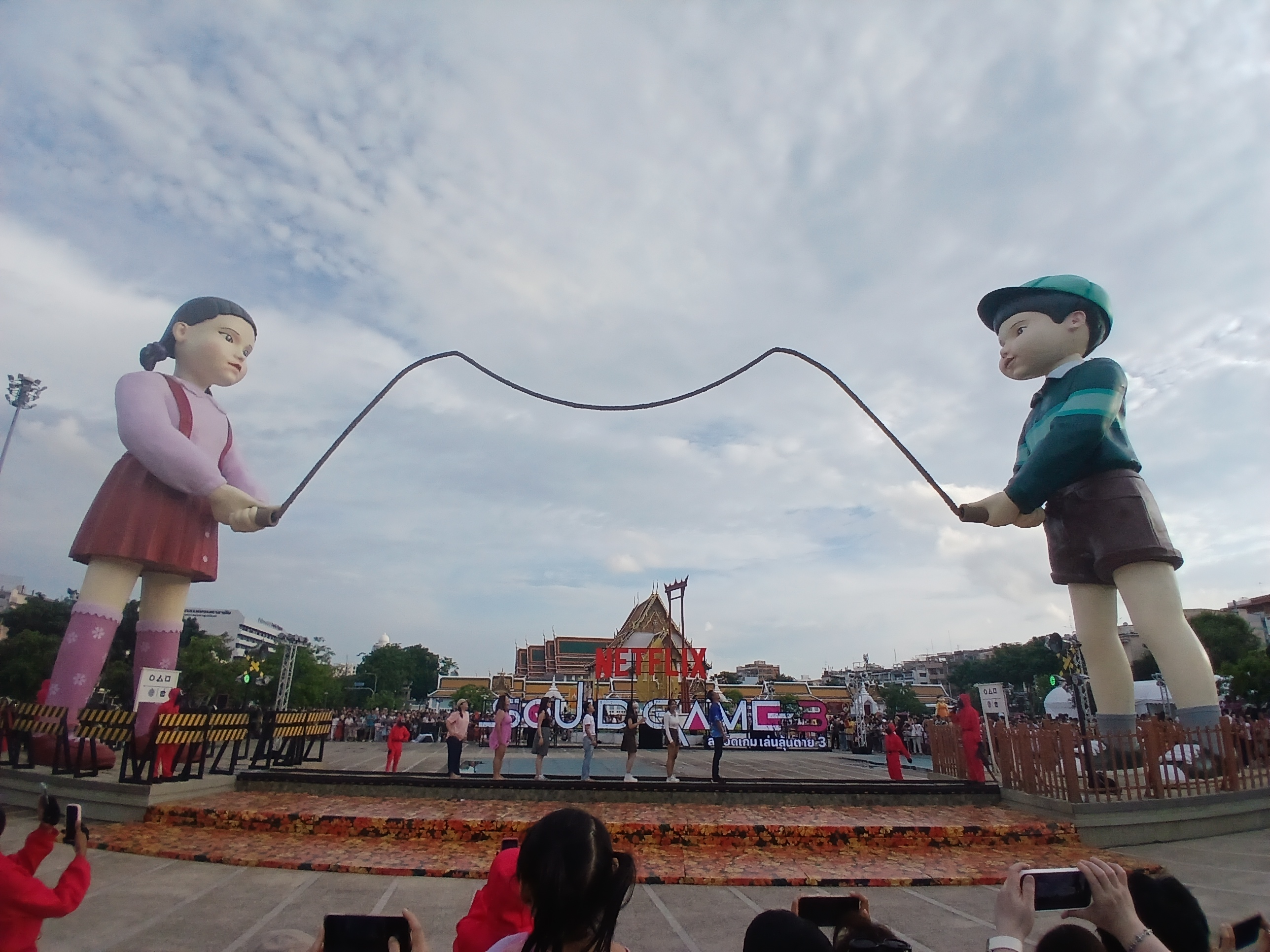
Promotional event for the Squid Game series at the Lan Khon Mueang
