= Faculty of Medicine Vajira Hospital, Navamindradhiraj University =

Medical school in Bangkok, Thailand

- คณะแพทยศาสตร์วชิรพยาบาล มหาวิทยาลัยนวมินทราธิราช
- Former names: BMA Medical College and Vajira Hospital
- Type: Public
- Established: 1993
- Parent institution: Navamindradhiraj University
- Dean: Asst. Prof. Jakravoot Maneerit, M.D.
- Administrative staff: 2,553
- Students: 693
- Undergraduates: 550 (490 medical, 60 paramedic)
- Postgraduates: 143
- Location: Samsen Rd., Dusit, Bangkok, Thailand 13°46′50″N 100°30′33″E
- Campus: Dusit Campus
- Journal: Vajira Medical Journal
- Colors: Blue
- Website: www.vajira.ac.th

The Faculty of Medicine Vajira Hospital (Thai: คณะแพทยศาสตร์วชิรพยาบาล) is a medical school of Navamindradhiraj University, located in Bangkok, Thailand. It has its origin as Bangkok Metropolitan Administration Medical College in 1993. It is run in collaboration with Vajira Hospital and Bangkok Metropolitan Administration Medical Department.

The faculty has become a part of the newly established Navamindradhiraj University. The Faculty of Medicine Vajira Hospital was an affiliated college of Mahidol University between 1985 and 2011.

== History ==
Vajira Hospital in the 1920s; Wachiranusorn building, now used as a museum

Vajira Hospital is the fourth public hospital built in Siam, founded in 1913 (B.E. 2455) by H.M. the King Vajiravudh. It is one of the first hospitals to employ modern medicine and practices. Vajira Hospital intends to provide the people of Bangkok with efficient primary health care. It was named by the King Vajiravudh, who came to open the hospital on January 2, 1913 (B.E. 2455). Its earliest buildings are located on Samsen Road, in present-day Dusit District, Bangkok.

Vajira Hospital established a medical school in 1985, the 8th in Thailand, in cooperation with Srinakharinwirot University, as the Faculty of Medicine Vajira Hospital, Srinakharinwirot University. The faculty was organized by Vajira Hospital and was funded by the university. A few years later Bangkok Metropolitan Administration planned to start their own medical program, established as BMA Medical College (Thai: วิทยาลัยแพทยศาสตร์กรุงเทพมหานคร. This became an affiliated institution with Mahidol University, as the 3rd medical school of Mahidol University. In 1993, the college began opening admission process for students.

In 1998, BMA Medical College was merged with Vajira Hospital into a single organization under the name BMA Medical College and Vajira Hospital Thai: วิทยาลัยแพทยศาสตร์กรุงเทพมหานครและวชิรพยาบาล to form a union of medical education and healthcare services.

In 2010, BMA Medical College & Vajira Hospital, along with Kuakarun College of Nursing, joined to form University of Bangkok Metropolis (มหาวิทยาลัยกรุงเทพมหานคร), with the medical school's name changed to Faculty of Medicine Vajira Hospital, University of Bangkok Metropolis. It was officially declared in the Royal Thai Government Gazette on November 12, 2010. On June 3, 2011, H.M. the King Bhumibol Adulyadej presented the university with a new formal name, Navamindradhiraj University (Thai: มหาวิทยาลัยนวมินทราธิราช).

== Medical education ==
Vajira Hospital provides medical programs for both undergraduate and postgraduate medical students. Vajira accepts about 80 students each year, and also offers various residency and fellowship programs.

Vajira runs its medical program in cooperation with Mahidol University. Prior to the 2019 academic year, medical students attend their pre-clinical studies at Mahidol University with their first year at its main campus in Salaya. In their first year, the students study basic general studies, including subjects such as Biology Chemistry, Calculus, Statistics, and Physics. Students spend their second at the Faculty of Science, Mahidol University at Mahidol University's Phayathai campus, studying pre-clinic studies and basic medicine. The rest of pre-clinical studies and clinical training, starting from 3rd year, is provided at the faculty's campus at Vajira Hospital. This affiliation ended in 2019.

Since the 2019 academic year, medical education is taught at the Vajira Hospital campus since first year. In 2020, a program was introduced where separate cohort of medical students were trained at the Dusit Campus for the preclinical years and at Taksin Hospital in the clinical years.

Vajira is one of the country's leading medical schools in terms of medical science, clinical training and urban medication. Doctors graduated from Vajira are not only highly qualified and well trained, but also ethical and moral. Students are well trained in areas of public service, teaching as well as research.

== Departments ==
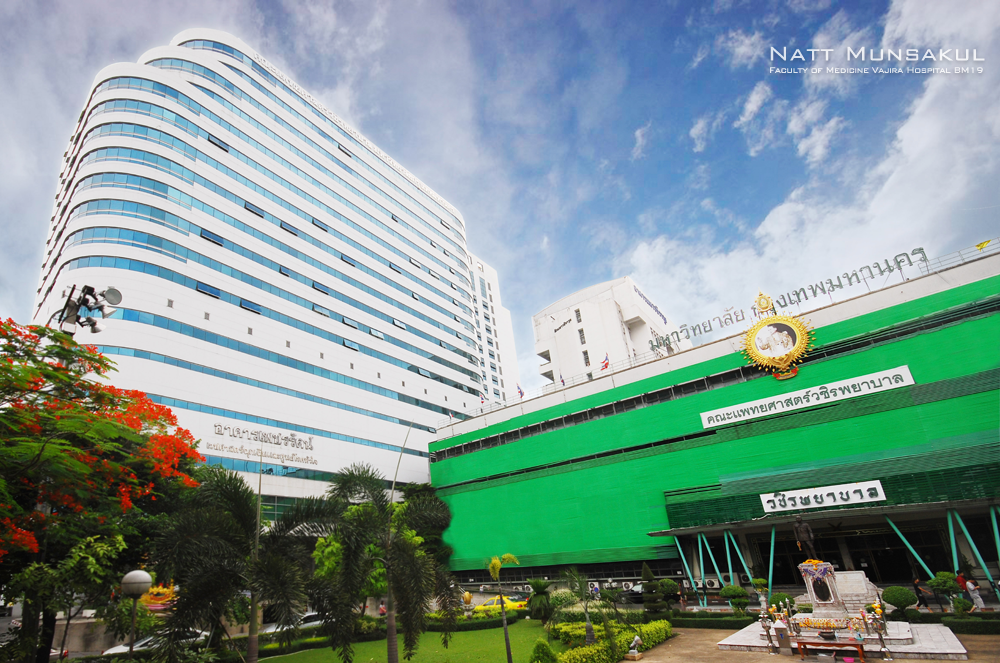
Vajira Medical School's headquarters at Vajira Hospital

- Department of Anatomical Pathology
- Department of Anesthesiology
- Department of Basic Medical Sciences
- Department of Clinical Pathology
- Department of Emergency Medicine
- Department of Forensic Medicine
- Department of Medical Research and Innovation
- Department of Medicine
- Department of Obstetrics and Gynaecology
- Department of Ophthalmology
- Department of Orthopedic Surgery
- Department of Otolaryngology
- Department of Pediatrics
- Department of Psychiatry
- Department of Radiologic Technology
- Department of Radiology
- Department of Rehabilitation Medicine
- Department of Surgery
- Department of Urban Medicine

== Programs ==
The faculty offers three undergraduate programs related to medical and allied health sciences.

Undergraduate programs	Postgraduate programs
Doctor of Medicine (M.D): Doctor of Medicine (M.D) 6-year course; Doctor of Medicine (M.D) with Emergency Medicine or Family Medicine Residency training; Bachelor of Science (B.Sc.) 4-year course: Medical Emergency Operation (Paramedic); Radiological Technology	Residency training for specialty and Fellowship training for sub-specialty: Anesthesiology; Emergency Medicine; Family Medicine; Intensive Care Medicine; Internal Medicine; Cardiology; Endocrinology and Metabolism; Gastroenterology; Haematology; Nephrology; Neurology; Oncology; Rheumatology; Obstetrics and Gynaecology; Ophthalmology; Orthopaedic Surgery; Otolaryngology; Pediatric; Plastic Surgery; Surgery; Neurosurgery; Plastic Surgery; Genitourinary Surgery

== Teaching hospitals ==
=== Main teaching hospital ===
- Vajira Hospital

=== Teaching hospital affiliates ===
- Taksin Hospital (Medical Service Department, BMA)
- Nakhon Pathom Hospital
- Chaiyaphum Hospital
- Queen Sirikit Naval Hospital, Naval Medical Department
- Bang Lamung Hospital
- Roi Et Hospital

== See also ==
- List of medical schools in Thailand
- Mahidol University
- Navamindradhiraj University
