= Queen Sirikit Gallery =

Art museum in Bangkok, Thailand

Coordinates: 13.756485°N 100.505037°E

Queen Sirikit Gallery or Queens Gallery (Thai: หอศิลป์สมเด็จพระนางเจ้าสิริกิติ์ พระบรมราชินีนาถ) is an art museum in Bangkok, Thailand.

The gallery was established in 2003 after a request by Queen Sirikit of Thailand. She named the exhibition center "The Queen Sirikit Arts Exhibition Center" in Thai, and "The Queen's Gallery" in English. The Queen's Gallery Foundation was established on 6 May 2003, and the queen presided at the official opening on 9 August 2003.

The gallery has 3,700 square metres (40,000 sq ft) of floor space in a five-storey building.
