= Chadchart Sittipunt =

Governor of Bangkok (2022-2026)

Associate Professor Chadchart Sittipunt MPCh MWM
- ชัชชาติ สิทธิพันธุ์
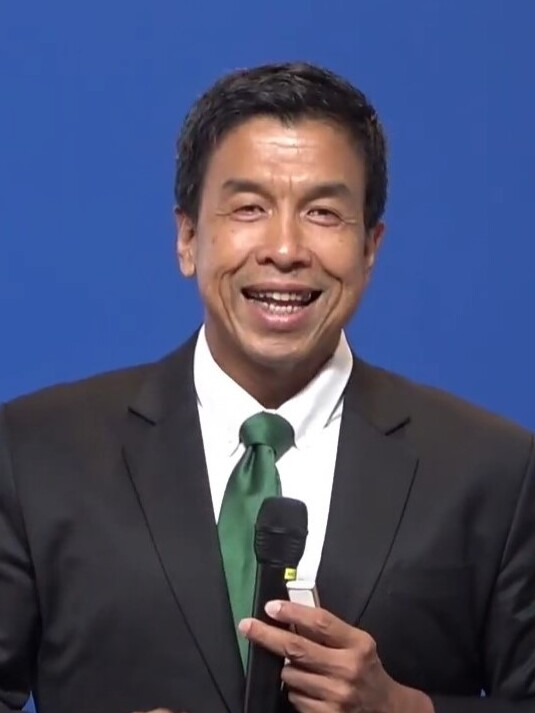
- Chadchart in 2023

17th Governor of Bangkok
- Incumbent
- Assumed office 22 May 2022
- Deputy: Chakkapan Phewngam (2022–2026); Sanon Wangsrangboon (2022–present); Wisanu Subsompon (2022–present); Tavida Kamolvej (2022–present); Pornphrom Vikitset (2026–present)
- Preceded by: Aswin Kwanmuang

Minister of Transport
- In office 27 October 2012 – 22 May 2014
- Prime Minister: Yingluck Shinawatra
- Preceded by: Charupong Ruangsuwan
- Succeeded by: Prajin Juntong

Deputy Minister of Transport
- In office 18 January 2012 – 27 October 2012
- Prime Minister: Yingluck Shinawatra
- Minister: Charupong Ruangsuwan

Personal details
- Born: 24 May 1966 (age 60) Bangkok, Thailand
- Party: Independent
- Other political affiliations: Pheu Thai (2012–2019)
- Spouse: Piyada Sittipunt (divorced: 2017)
- Relations: Phichit Kullavanich (uncle)
- Children: 1
- Education: Chulalongkorn University (BEng); Massachusetts Institute of Technology (MEng); University of Illinois Urbana-Champaign (DEng)
- Profession: Businessman, lecturer, politician
- Website: chadchartofficial.com

Chadchart Sittipunt (Thai: ชัชชาติ สิทธิพันธุ์, RTGS: Chatchat Sitthiphan, pronounced [t͡ɕʰát.t͡ɕʰâːt sìt.tʰí(ʔ).pʰān]; born 24 May 1966) is a Thai politician, engineer, and professor who is the incumbent Governor of Bangkok since 2022. He previously was Minister of Transport from 2012 to 2014.

== Early life and education ==
Chadchart is the third son of Police General Sa-nae Sitthiphan, former Commissioner of the Metropolitan Police Bureau and Jitcharung Kullawanit. His sister, Preechaya Sittipunt, is a retired lecturer in Architecture at Chulalongkorn University. She holds a Master's degree from Massachusetts Institute of Technology, and a Ph.D. from the University of California, Berkeley. His twin brother, Assoc. Prof. Chanchai Sittipunt, is the dean of Faculty of Medicine, Chulalongkorn University.

Chatchart graduated high school from Chulalongkorn University Demonstration School and Triam Udom Suksa School. He completed a bachelor's degree in Civil Engineering (First Class Honors) from Chulalongkorn University and then received a Master's of Structural Engineering from the Massachusetts Institute of Technology (MIT) and a Doctorate of Engineering from the University of Illinois Urbana-Champaign in the USA with Ananda Mahidol Foundation Scholarship in 1987. Furthermore, he also completed a Master's degree in Business Administration (MBA) from Chulalongkorn University.

== Career ==
Chadchart used to work as a structural engineer in a private company. Later in 1995, he joined the Faculty of Engineering, Chulalongkorn University as an associate professor and an assistant to the president. In addition, he has served as a director in many state enterprises such as The Transport Company Limited, Mass Rapid Transit Authority of Thailand and Aeronautical Radio of Thailand Limited and in 2008 to January 2012 as an independent director Audit Committee and Member of the Nomination and Remuneration Committee, Land and Houses Plc.

In January 2015, Chadchart was appointed as CEO and managing director of Quality Houses Public Company Limited (QH). On 29 December 2018, Chadchart resigned from the position and returned to work for the Pheu Thai Party.

== Political career ==
Chadchart as an academic had the opportunity to help and give advice to the Ministry of Transport during the Thaksin Shinawatra and Samak Sundaravej governments without holding any position until 2012, when Prime Minister Yingluck Shinawatra invited him to serve as the Deputy Minister of Transport.

Chadchart was appointed as the Minister of Transport in October 2012. Chadchart as Minister of Transport is regarded as an elite figure of the government in the country's strategic planning.

In 2019, Chadchart announced that he intended to run in the 2022 Bangkok gubernatorial election as an independent candidate. In February 2022, Chadchart officially launched his gubernatorial election campaign, with the slogan "Bangkok, a liveable city for everyone" (Thai: "กรุงเทพฯ เมืองน่าอยู่สำหรับทุกคน") with important policies such as creating a network of maps of crime hotspots, and developing a public transport system to make Bangkok a city of arts and learning. Bhichit Rattakul, former Governor of Bangkok, and Nikom Wairatpanij, former President of the Senate of Thailand also joined Chadchart for the campaign.

Chadchart won the 2022 Bangkok gubernatorial election in a landslide victory, receiving over 1.3 million votes and becoming the first governor-elect to lead in all 50 districts. He ran for re-election in the 2026 Bangkok gubernatorial election, also winning by a landslide that surpassed his own record in 2022.

== Public image ==
While serving as a minister, Chadchart had the image of a down-to-earth man. In 2013, an image of Chadchart walking barefoot into a Buddhist temple went viral as an internet meme, gaining him the nickname of "the world's strongest minister" in Thai internet circles and media. The memes are often in the same absurd hyperbolic style as Chuck Norris jokes, and he was often compared to Hanma Yujiro from the Baki manga franchise. In June 2022, a friend of Wanchalearm Satsaksit claimed that the image was taken by Wanchalearm himself. It came during a talk in remembrance of Wanchalearm's second year of getting abducted.

== Royal decorations ==
- 2013 – Knight Grand Cordon (Special Class) of the Most Exalted Order of the White Elephant
- 2012 – Knight Grand Cordon (Special Class) of the Most Noble Order of the Crown of Thailand

Political offices
Preceded by Charupong Ruangsuwan	Minister of Transport; 2012–2014	Succeeded by Prajin Juntong
Preceded by Aswin Kwanmuang	Governor of Bangkok; 2022–present	Incumbent
