= Bangkok Metropolitan Administration =

Local government of Bangkok, Thailand

Bangkok Metropolitan Administration กรุงเทพมหานคร
- Seal of the Bangkok Metropolitan Administration

- Flag of Bangkok

Type
- Type: Special local authority organisation of Bangkok
- Term limits: Governor limited to 2 consecutive terms, third term must be 4 years after second term

History
- Founded: 13 December 1972
- Preceded by: Bangkok Municipality

Leadership

Executive
- Governor of Bangkok: Chadchart Sittipunt, Independent; Since 22 May 2022
- Deputy Governors of Bangkok: Chakkapan Phewngam; Wisanu Subsompon; Tavida Kamolvej; Sanon Wangsrangboon; Since 1 June 2022
- Permanent Secretary: Narong Ruengsri; Since 1 October 2025

Legislative
- Chair: Pattraporn Kengrungruengchai, People’s; Since 13th July 2026
- First Deputy Chair: Viput Srivaurai, Pheu Thai; Since 6 June 2024
- Second Deputy Chair: Chatchai Mordee, Move Forward; Since 6 June 2024

Structure
- Seats: 1 Governor and 50 Councillors
- Length of term: Four years

Elections
- Governor of Bangkok voting system: First past the post, whole of Bangkok
- Bangkok Metropolitan Council voting system: First past the post, each district
- Last Governor of Bangkok election: 28 June 2026
- Last Bangkok Metropolitan Council election: 28 June 2026

Meeting place
- Airawat Patthana Building; Second Bangkok City Hall; Din Daeng, Bangkok

Website
- www.bangkok.go.th

The Bangkok Metropolitan Administration (BMA) is the local government of Bangkok, which includes the capital of Thailand. The government is composed of two branches: the executive (the Governor of Bangkok) and the legislative (Bangkok Metropolitan Council). The administration's roles are to formulate and implement policies to manage Bangkok. Its purview includes transport services, urban planning, waste management, housing, roads and highways, security services, and the environment.

According to the Thailand Future Foundation, Bangkok employs a workforce of 97,000, including 3,200 municipal officers in Bangkok city, 200 in the City Law Enforcement Department, and 3,000 in district offices.

== Departments ==
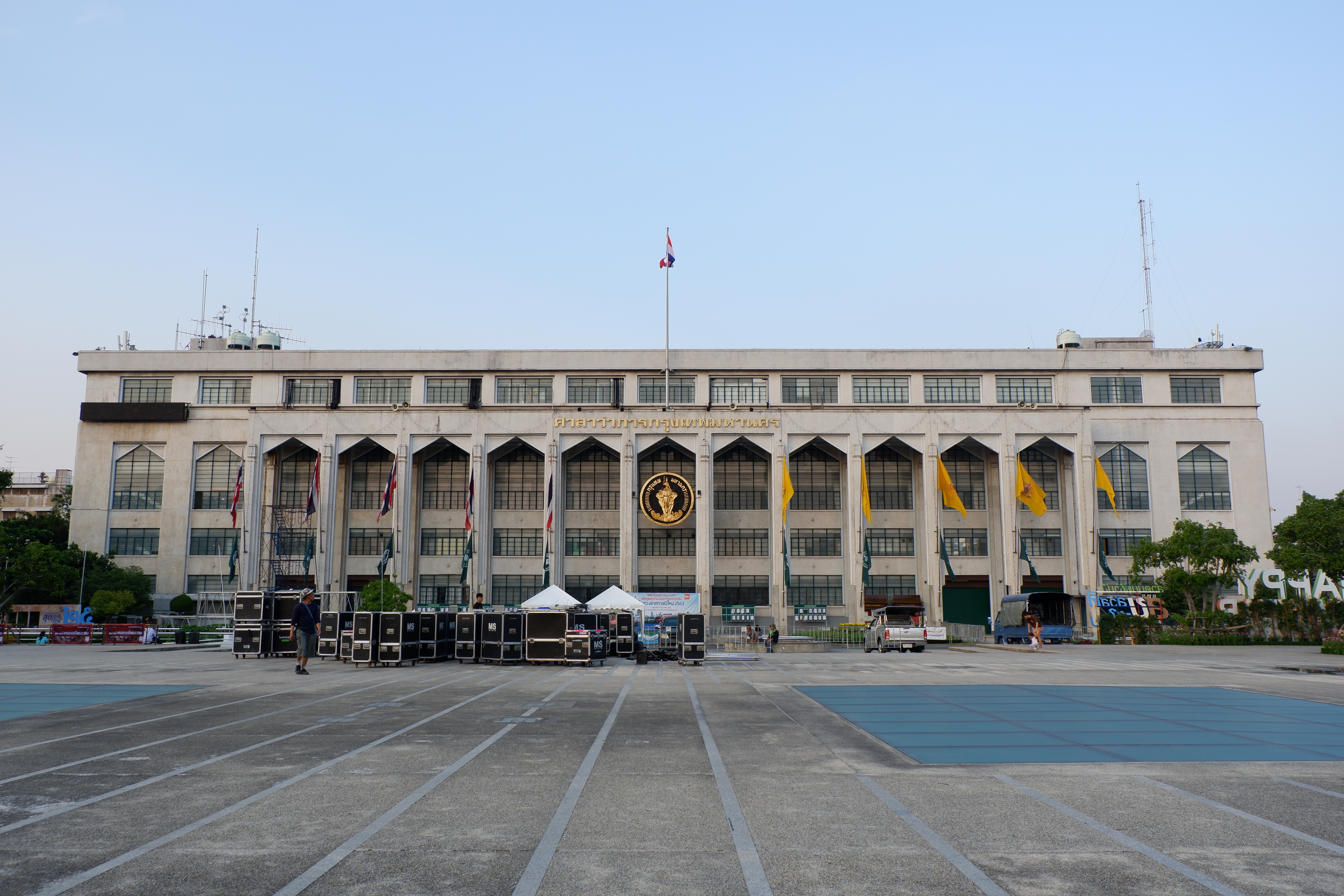
First Bangkok City Hall on Dinso Road

BMA has 70 departments in total, 50 of which are departments respective to the 50 districts of Bangkok. The rest consist of:

- The Governor of Bangkok Secretariat
- The Bangkok Metropolitan Council Secretariat
- Office of the Permanent Secretary
- Office of the Bangkok Metropolitan Administration Civil Service Commission
- Strategy and Evaluation Department
- Medical Service Department
- Health Department
- Education Department
- Public Works Department
- Drainage and Sewerage Department
- Environment Department
- Culture, Sports and Tourism Department
- Finance Department
- City Law Enforcement Department
- Social Development Department
- Traffic and Transportation Department
- City Planning and Urban Development Department
- Fire and Rescue Department
- Budget Department
- Digital Department

=== City Law Enforcement Department ===
City Law Enforcement Department is the primary unit for overseeing security and orderliness of Bangkok with more than 3,000 quality personnel. Which has 5 important tasks which are to organize the city, Security, Traffic supervision, Tourism Administration and other special missions. Responsible for overseeing, investigating, arresting, prosecuting and enforcing Bangkok Metropolis regulations and other laws within the jurisdiction of Bangkok including operations beyond the authority of the district office or in the case of serious danger to most people.

=== Fire and Rescue Department ===
Fire and Rescue Department operates the city's fire and rescue services. The Bangkok City Council reported in February 2018 that, of Bangkok's 874 fire trucks, only 88 were in "good" condition. Another 340 were rated "only just usable", 232 were "dilapidated", and 225 were parked permanently. Firefighting boats were found to be in roughly the same shape: three of 31 vessels were ranked in "good" condition and 21 were out of service and permanently docked. The BMA's firefighting unit has not been allocated a vehicle maintenance budget for nearly 10 years. The BMA employs 1,800 firefighters as of 2018.

=== Medical Service Department ===
Medical Service Department operates 11 hospitals and is headquartered at BMA General Hospital (Klang Hospital) in Pom Prap Sattru Phai District. Other hospitals include Taksin Hospital, Charoenkrung Pracharak Hospital, Sirindhorn Hospital, Lat Krabang Hospital, Luang Pho Taweesak Hospital, Wetchakarunrasm Hospital, Ratchaphiphat Hospital, Khlong Sam Wa Hospital, Bang Na Hospital and the Bang Khun Thian Geriatric Hospital. The department also operates the Erawan Medical Centre for emergency medical services.

=== City Planning and Urban Development Department ===
City Planning and Urban Development Department are divided to Secretarial Office, Town Planning Office, Urban Development and Renewal Office, Geo-Informatics Office, Town Planning Control Division, Policy and Planning Division. The department has a duty to planning of the city including planning for the development of specific areas, planning for conservation Rehabilitation and planning for urban development and also an agency for controlling, promoting and inspecting the use of land and buildings.

=== Navamindradhiraj University ===
BMA autonomously manages Navamindradhiraj University, of which the Faculty of Medicine Vajira Hospital and Kuakarun Faculty of Nursing are part.

=== Krungthep Thanakom ===
Krungthep Thanakom Company Limited is the BMA's holding company for public investment projects such as the concession for the BTS Skytrain and a 20 billion baht underground cable project.

== Budget ==
Bangkok's FY2024 budget totals ฿90,570,138,630. Most of the budget goes to civil construction and maintenance projects.

== Governor of Bangkok ==
The governor of Bangkok (Thai: ผู้ว่าราชการกรุงเทพมหานคร, RTGS: phu wa ratchakan krung thep maha nakhon) is the head of the local government of Bangkok. The governor is also the chief executive of the Bangkok Metropolitan Administration (BMA). The governor is elected to a renewable term of four years, currently it is one of the two directly elected executive offices in the kingdom. The office is comparable to that of a city mayor.

From 2016 to 2022 Pol Gen Aswin Kwanmuang acted as Governor of Bangkok. He was appointed by Prime Minister Prayut Chan-o-cha using Section 44 of the interim charter to replace Sukhumbhand Paribatra. The reason given for his ouster was "...because he was involved in many legal cases."

The current incumbent is Chadchart Sittipunt. He was elected in a landslide victory in the 2022 Bangkok gubernatorial election, receiving 52.65 % (1.38 Million) of all votes cast, marking a new record-high, and winning in all 50 districts of Bangkok.

== Bangkok Metropolitan Council ==
Bangkok Metropolitan Council สภากรุงเทพมหานคร Sapha Krung Thep Maha Nakhon

Type
- Type: City Council

Leadership
- Chairman of the Council: Surachit Phongsinghvithya, Pheu Thai since 6 June 2024
- Seats: 50 members

Elections
- Last election: 22 May 2022

Meeting place
- Bangkok City Hall

Website
- http://www.bangkok.go.th/sbmc

The Bangkok Metropolitan Council or BMC (Thai: สภากรุงเทพมหานคร) is the legislative branch of the administration. It is vested with primary legislative powers as well as the power to scrutinize and advise the governor. The council is headed by the Chairman of the Bangkok Metropolitan Council (Thai: ประธานสภากรุงเทพมหานคร). The current chairman, since 2013, is Captain Kriangsak Lohachala.

The number of members depends on the size of Bangkok's population. One member represents one hundred thousand people. From 2010 to 2014 there were 61 members, elected from 57 constituencies (some constituencies elect more than one member) in Bangkok. Each is elected to a four-year term. The last election was held on 22 May 2022. Currently there are 50 members, with Pheu Thai making up 20 seats, Move Forward 14 seats, the Democrat Party 9 seats, Rak Krungthep 3 seats, Phalang Pracharat 2 seats and Thai Srang Thai another 2 seats.

== Criticism ==
The Bangkok Post has made the point that, although the city suffers from the "worst traffic congestion in the world after Mexico City", 37 disparate agencies are responsible for traffic management, planning, and infrastructure. It maintains that the city government panders to personal automobile use. As evidence, it points to the city's plans to construct four new bridges across the Chao Phraya River, its runaway air pollution, its lack of green space—less than that of any other Asian capital—and its "...obsession with felling trees along Bangkok streets."

== See also ==
- Provinces of Thailand
- Districts of Bangkok
- History of Bangkok
