= Ti Thong Road =

Road in Bangkok, Thailand

Coordinates: 13°44′51.8″N 100°30′0.33″E

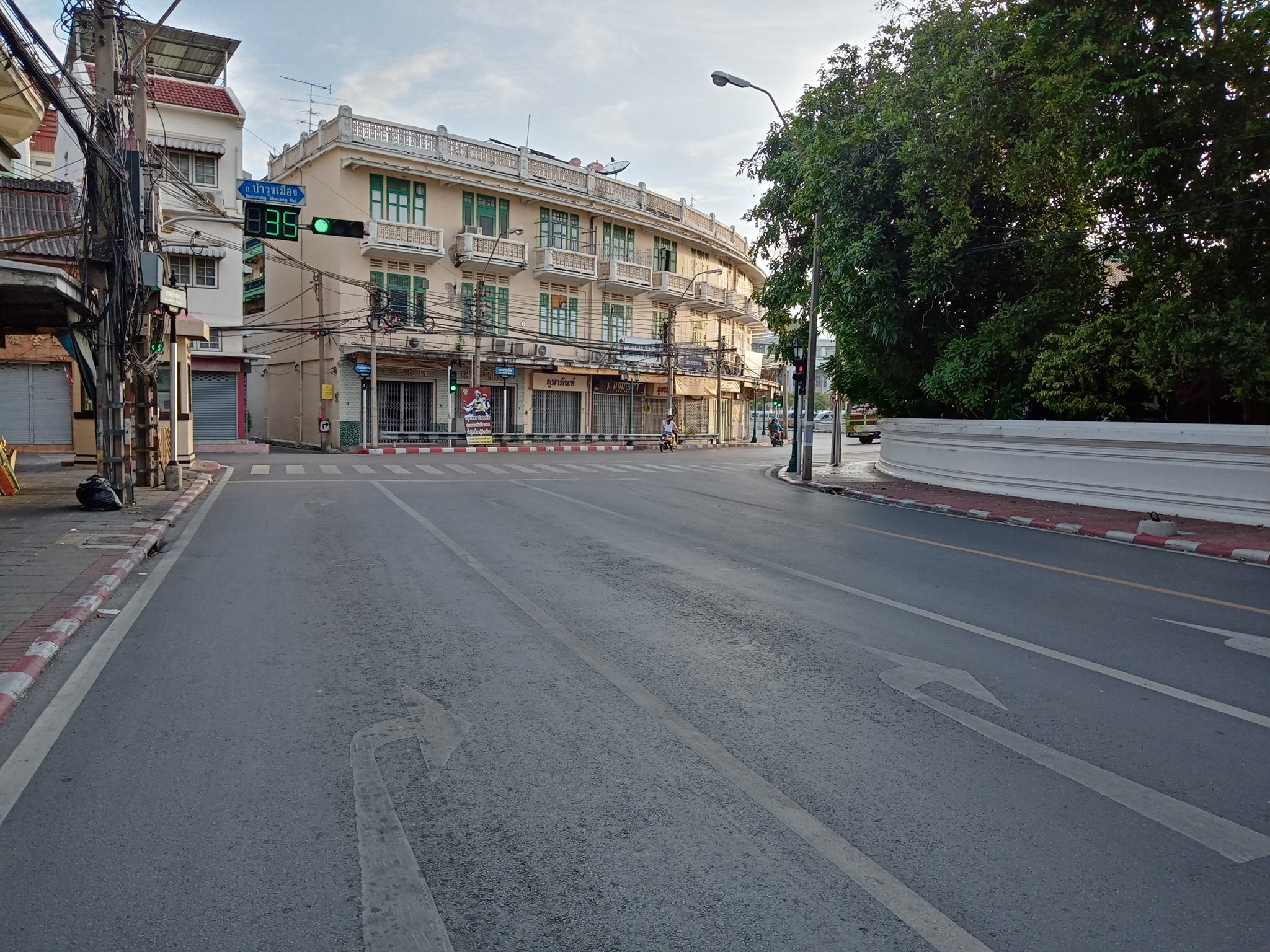
A view from Ti Thong Road toward Bamrung Mueang Road

Ti Thong Road (Thai: ถนนตีทอง, RTGS: Thanon Ti Thong, pronounced [tʰā.nǒn tīː tʰɔ̄ːŋ]) is one of the roads in inner Bangkok, or Rattanakosin Island. It is a short road, 525 m (1,722.4 ft) long, built during the reign of King Chulalongkorn (Rama V), connecting Bamrung Mueang and Charoen Krung Roads. These two were the first official roads in Thailand, constructed during the reign of King Mongkut (Rama IV).

The road begins at Bamrung Mueang Road near the corner of the Giant Swing Plaza and runs southward past Wat Suthat. It then crosses Khlong Lot Wat Ratchabophit, which is part of the old city moat, and continues to Charoen Krung Road. After crossing Chaloem Krung Intersection, where the Sala Chalermkrung Royal Theatre is located on the northeast corner, it continues as Tri Phet Road.

In addition, it connects with Thailand's third official road, Fueang Nakhon Road, via Ratchabophit Road, a short alley-like road that passes Trok Mo Market and Wat Ratchabophit.

Its name literally means 'gold beating road', referring to a "goldsmith road", because it runs through an area formerly known as Ban Chang Thong (บ้านช่างทอง, RTGS: Ban Chang Thong, [bâːn t͡ɕʰâŋ tʰɔ̄ːŋ], lit. 'goldsmith hamlet'). This was where Lao communities from Luang Prabang and Vientiane settled during the early Rattanakosin period. The area of Ban Chang Thong extended as far as today's Khok Wua Intersection on Ratchadamnoen Avenue. At the time of construction, many Lao residents were goldsmiths and also served as court artisans. Over time, this area became known for producing gold leaves, created by pounding pure gold into extremely thin sheets used in lai rot nam ('Thai gilded black lacquer') and other traditional Thai decorative arts.

Although the craft of gold leaf making has disappeared, evidence of this heritage remains in a couple of small alleys on the west side of the road, namely Trok Fueang Thong (ตรอกเฟื่องทอง, RTGS: Trok Fueang Thong, [trɔ̀ːk fɯ̂aŋ tʰɔ̄ːŋ], lit. 'prosperous gold lane'), and Trok Wisut (ตรอกวิสูตร, RTGS: Trok Wisut, [trɔ̀ːk wí.sùːt]). Today, both alleys are home to families who have inherited and continued the goldsmithing tradition. They produce a variety of handcrafted gold products such as rings, bracelets, and earrings, using techniques passed down through generations. These artisans are not descended from the original Lao settlers, however, but rather from Thai workers particularly from the Isan region, who once migrated to work as employees in Chinese-owned gold shops in Yaowarat area. Over time, many of these workers acquired skills from their employers and gradually transitioned from being wage labourers to becoming independent master craftsmen in their own right.

Nowadays, Ti Thong Road is well known as a centre for shops selling official uniforms and accessories for Thai military and police officers, as well as trophy and ceremonial goods.
