= Si Kak Sao Chingcha =

Coordinates: 13°45′05.29″N 100°29′53.47″E

- สี่กั๊กเสาชิงช้า
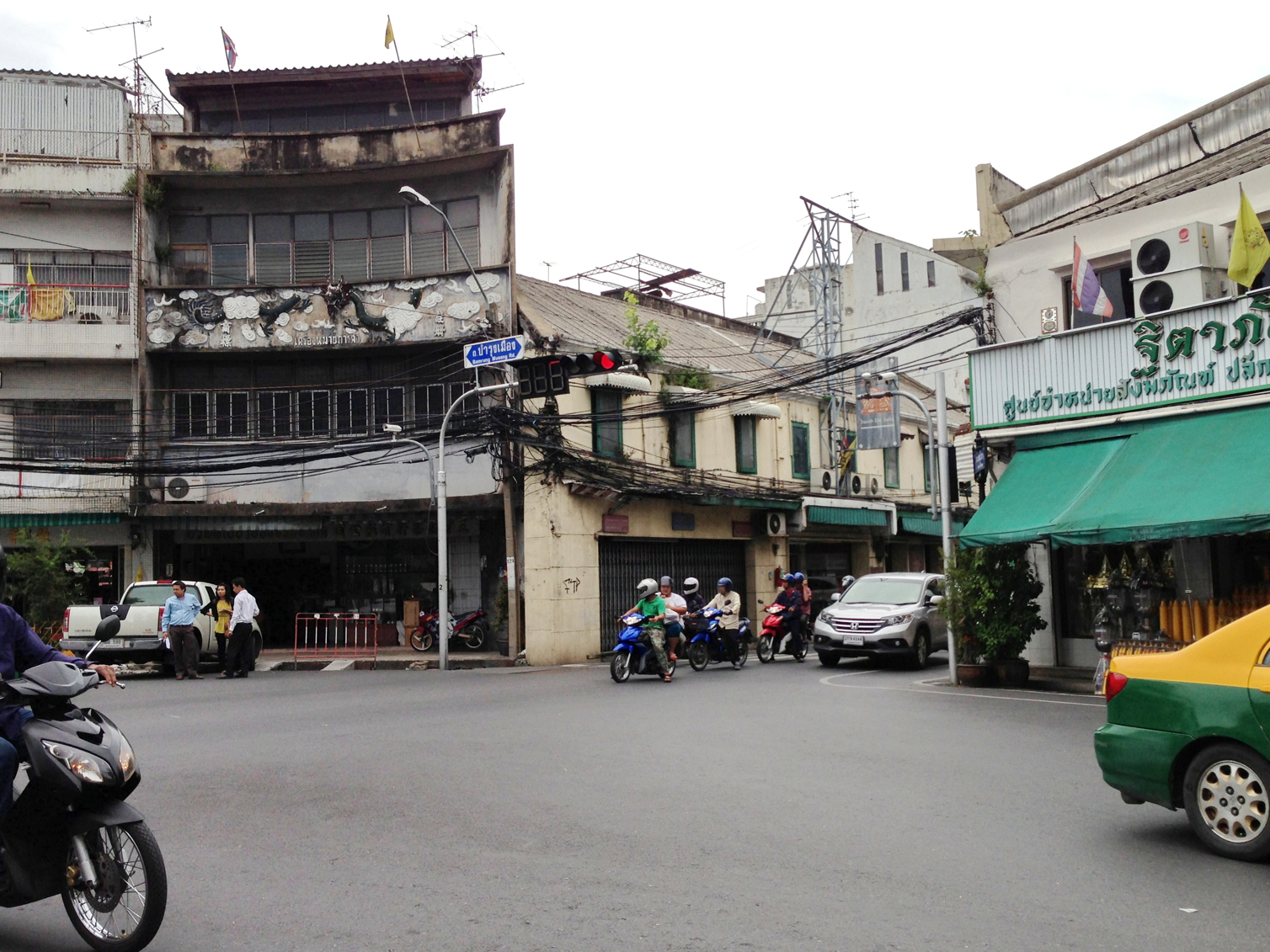
- Si Kak Sao Chingcha seen from the Bamrung Mueang road
- Interactive map of Si Kak Sao Chingcha

Location
- San Chao Pho Suea, Sao Chingcha, Wat Ratchabophit, Phra Nakhon, Bangkok, Thailand
- Roads at junction: Thanao (north); Bamrung Mueang (east–west); Fueang Nakhon (south)

Construction
- Type: Four-way at-grade intersection

Si Kak Sao Chingcha (Thai: สี่กั๊กเสาชิงช้า, pronounced [sìː kák sǎw t͡ɕʰīŋ.t͡ɕʰáː]) is a four-way intersection located at the tripoint of San Chao Pho Suea, Sao Chingcha, and Wat Ratchabophit sub-districts within Phra Nakhon district, Bangkok. It connects Thanao, Bamrung Mueang, and Fueang Nakhon roads and marks the starting point of Thanao Road. From this intersection, the Giant Swing is clearly visible along Bamrung Mueang Road.

This intersection is one of only two in Bangkok that still retain the term "Si Kak" in their names, the other being nearby Si Kak Phraya Si (สี่กั๊กพระยาศรี, pronounced [sìː kák pʰrā.jāː sǐː]). Both are linked by Fueang Nakhon Road, which is just 0.5 km (about 0.3 mi) long. Fueang Nakhon was constructed alongside Charoen Krung and Bamrung Mueang Roads during the reign of King Mongkut (Rama IV), making these three among the earliest formal roads in Thailand.

The phrase "Si Kak" (Chinese: 四角) comes from the Teochew dialect, meaning "four-way intersection". "Sao Chingcha" is a Thai term referring to the Giant Swing, a Hindu religious structure located in front of Wat Suthat. Historically, the Triyampawai ceremony, held during the Songkran festival, began its procession at this very intersection.

The area surrounding Si Kak Sao Chingcha is rich with historic charm, featuring old shophouses that house a variety of establishments such as a Rolex dealer, a traditional teahouse, workshops for Buddha statues and religious idols, souvenir shops, restaurants, and a branch of the Siam Commercial Bank. The Ministry of Interior building is also located nearby.

Just off Thanao Road near this intersection are three smaller streets known as Sam Praeng (สามแพร่ง, pronounced [sǎːm pʰrɛ̂ŋ], lit. 'three crossroads'), named after three members of the royal family who once had palaces in this area. Sam Praeng is renowned for its historical and architectural significance, showcasing Sino-Portuguese style shophouses inspired by Singaporean designs dating back to the reign of King Vajiravudh (Rama VI).
