= Mahannop Road =

Street in Bangkok, Thailand

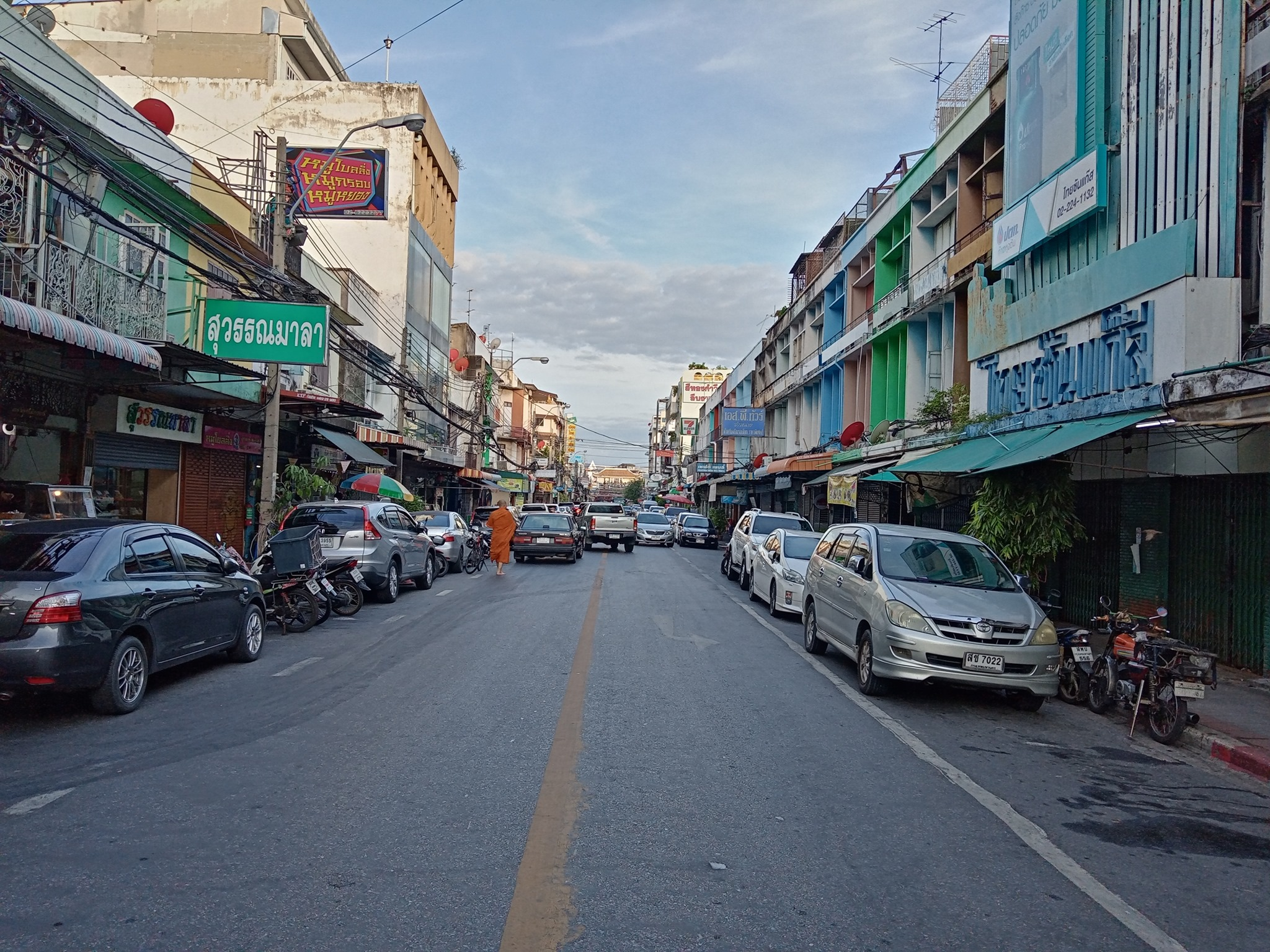
- Mahannop Road in the morning (mid 2022)
- Interactive map of Mahannop Road
- Native name: ถนนมหรณพ
- Namesake: Wat Mahannapharam
- Length: 300 m (980 ft)
- Location: Phra Nakhon, Bangkok, Thailand
- Coordinates: 13°45′12″N 100°30′02″E
- Southeast end: Dinso Road
- Northwest end: Tanao Road

Mahannop Road (Thai: ถนนมหรรณพ, RTGS: Thanon Mahannop, pronounced [tʰa.nǒn ma.han.nóp]) is a small road, or soi, in Bangkok. This short road is about 300 m (984.3 ft) long and runs entirely within the Sao Chingcha subdistrict of Phra Nakhon district, in the historic neighbourhood known as Rattanakosin Island.

It begins at the west side of Dinso Road, near Bangkok City Hall, and runs northwest until it meets Tanao Road, where the notable Chinese joss house San Chaopho Suea, dedicated to Xuandi, is located.

The road was built in 1917 after a great fire on Tanao Road. Chaophraya Yommarat (Pan Sukhum), Chancellor of the Metropolitan (the equivalent of today's Minister of Interior and Governor of Bangkok), proposed that the government construct a new road both to improve travel and to help prevent future disasters in the fire-affected area. When construction was completed, King Vajiravudh (Rama VI) named it Mahannop after Wat Mahannapharam (abbreviated Wat Mahannop) on nearby Tanao Road.

Today, Mahannop Road is known for its many eateries and cafés, similar to nearby Dinso Road and Sam Phraeng. One of these establishments was even recognized by the Michelin Guide with a Bib Gourmand in 2022. The road is also home to a hostel for tourists, travel agencies, and two 7-Eleven convenience stores.

On Saturday and Sunday, 2–3 November 2024, from 4:00 pm to 10:00 pm, Mahannop Road will be closed to traffic and turned into a pedestrian zone to promote tourism and stimulate the local economy.
