= Wat Ratchabophit subdistrict =

Wat Ratchabophit วัดราชบพิธ
- Khwaeng
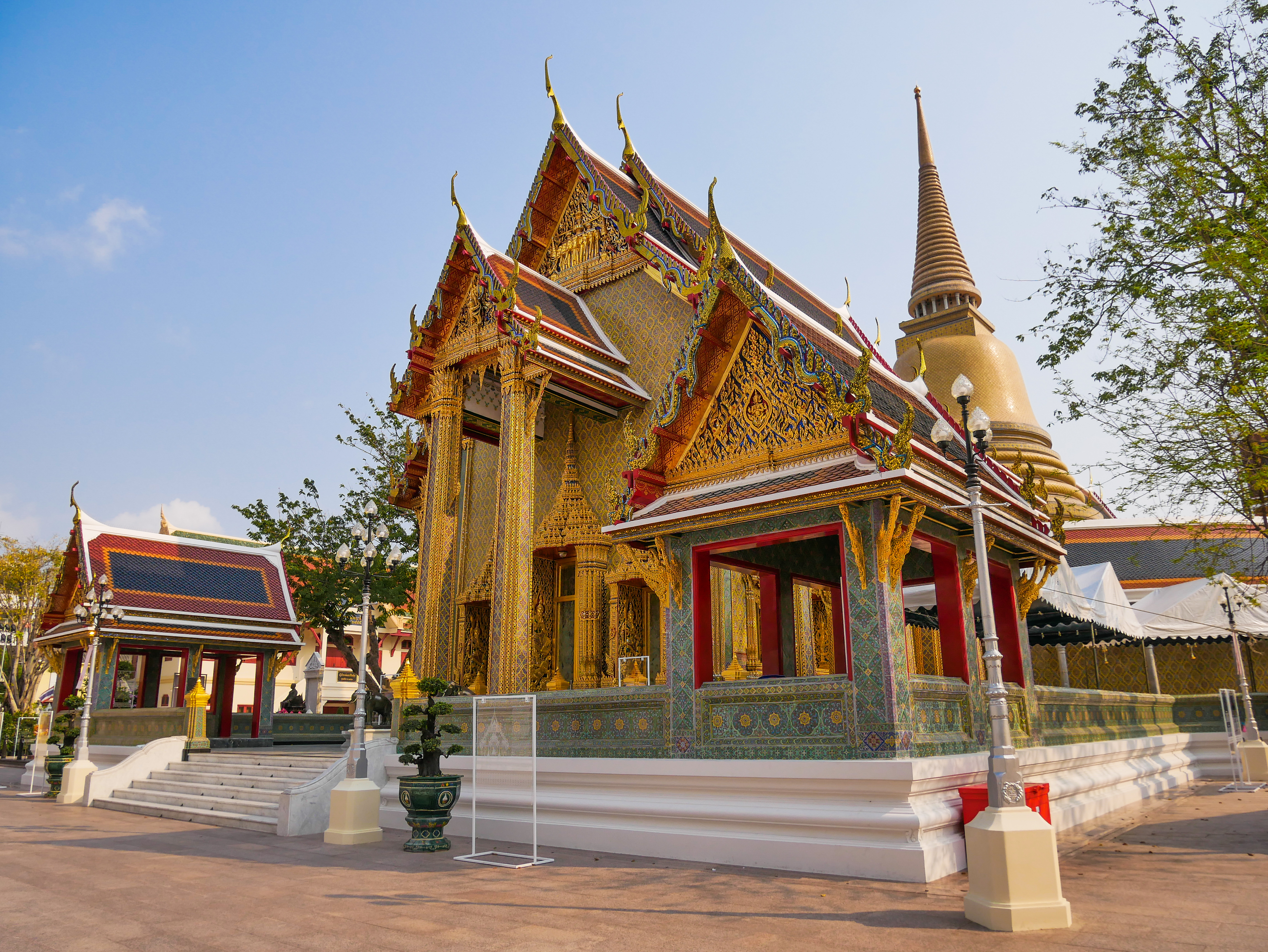
- Wat Ratchabophit, the eponymous

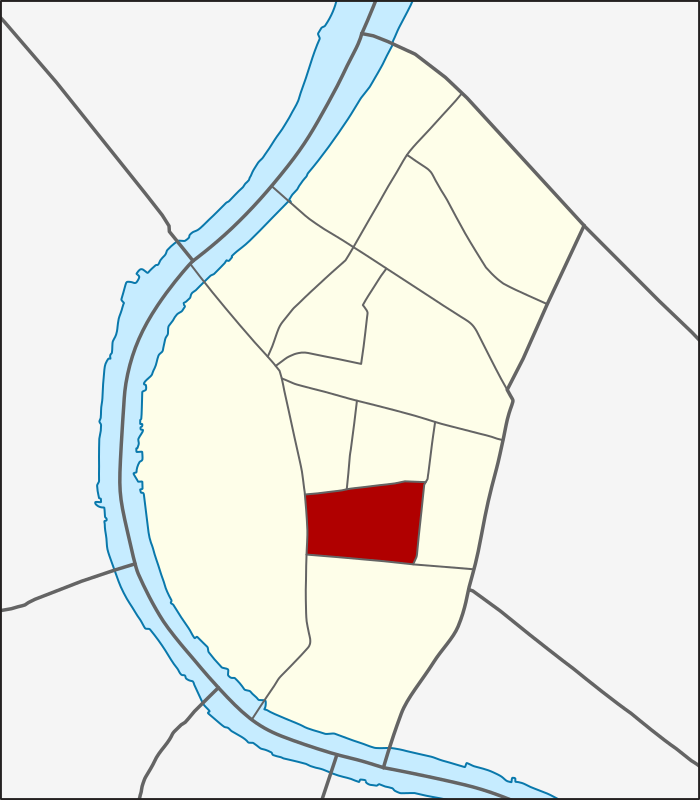
- Location in Phra Nakhon District
- Country: Thailand
- Province: Bangkok
- Khet: Phra Nakhon
- Named for: Wat Ratchabophit

Area
  - Total: 0.220 km^{2} (0.085 sq mi)

Population (2021)
  - Total: 2,964
  - Density: 13,472.73/km^{2} (34,894.2/sq mi)
- Time zone: UTC+7 (ICT)
- Postal code: 10200
- Area code: 100103

Wat Ratchabophit (Thai: วัดราชบพิธ, pronounced [wát râːt.t͡ɕʰā.bɔ̄ː.pʰít]) is a khwaeng (subdistrict) in Phra Nakhon District, Bangkok.

== Naming ==
The subdistrict is named after Wat Ratchabophit, a dominant Buddhist temple in the area. Built by King Chulalongkorn (Rama V) in 1869 and completed in 1870. This small, quiet but significant temple, its name means "The Temple Built by the King". It is another temple of the King Chulalongkorn besides Wat Benchamabophit (Marble Temple), also it is the temple of the King Prajadhipok (Rama VII) as well.

== Geography ==
Wat Ratchabophit is considered to be the central part indented to the south of the district. Entire area is in the Rattanakosin Island (Bangkok's old town zone is entirely surrounded by waterway like island).

Adjoining areas are (from the north clockwise): San Chaopho Suea, Sao Chingcha (Bamrung Mueang Road is a boundary), Samran Rat (Siri Phong Road is a boundary), Wang Burapha Phirom (Khlong Lot Wat Ratchabophit is a boundary), and Phra Borom Maha Ratchawang (Khlong Khu Mueang Doem is a boundary).

== Places ==
- Wat Ratchabophit and the royal cemetery
- Wat Suthat
- Sao Chingcha (Giant Swing)
- Ministry of Interior
- Trok Mo Market

== Gallery ==
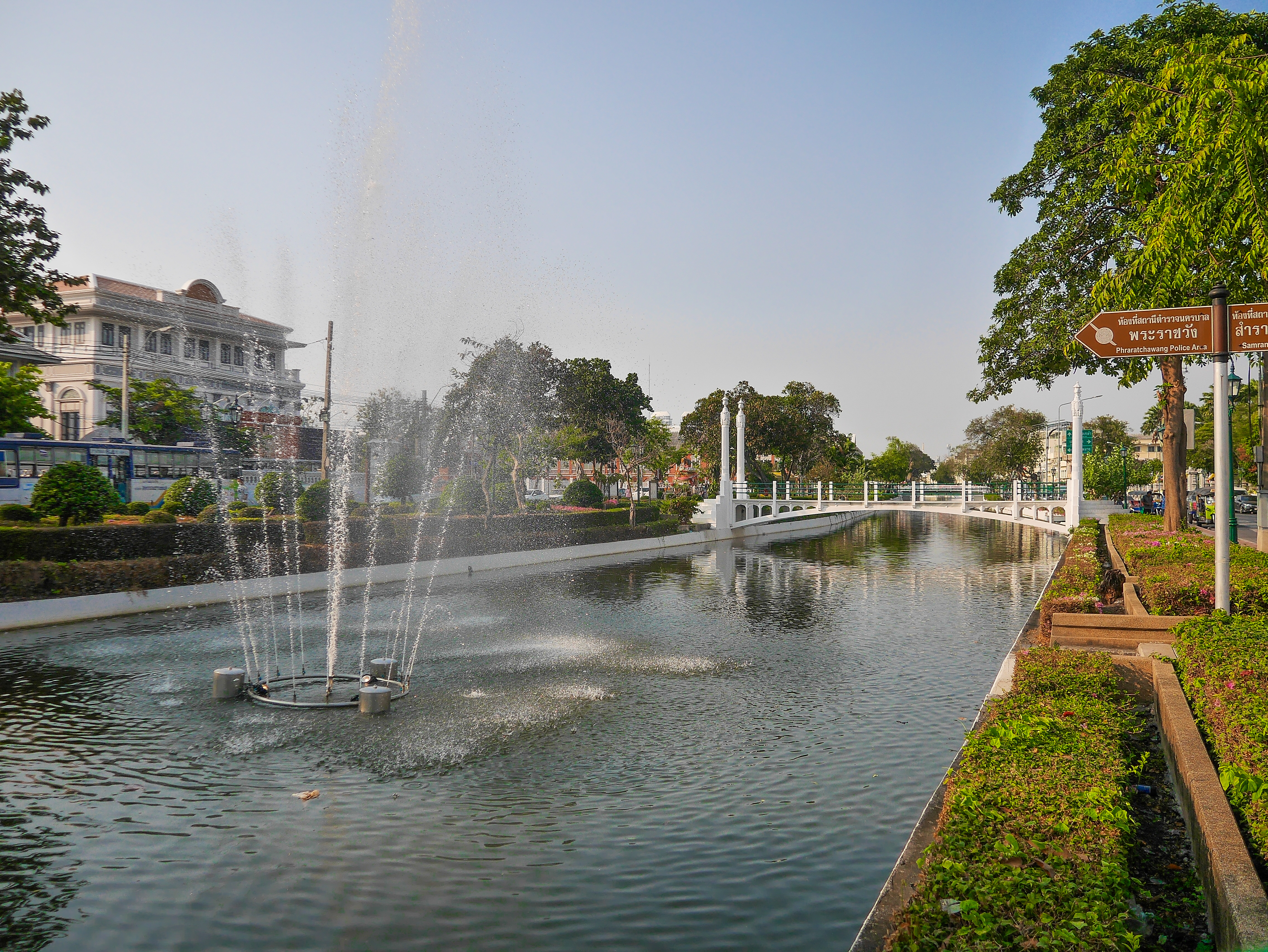
Khlong Khu Mueang Doem (old city moat) left: Phra Borom Maha Ratchawang, right: Wat Ratchabophit

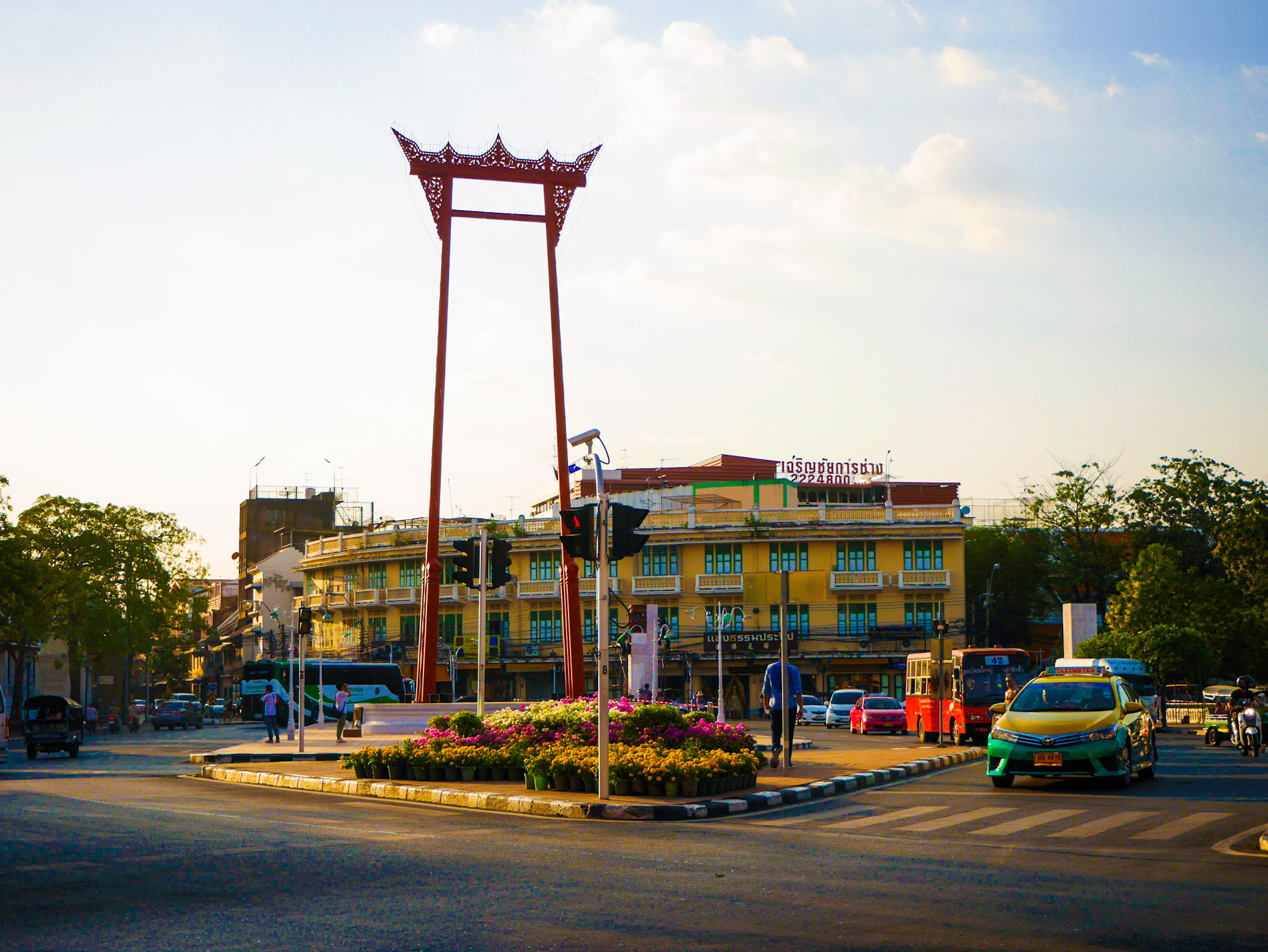
Sao Chingcha

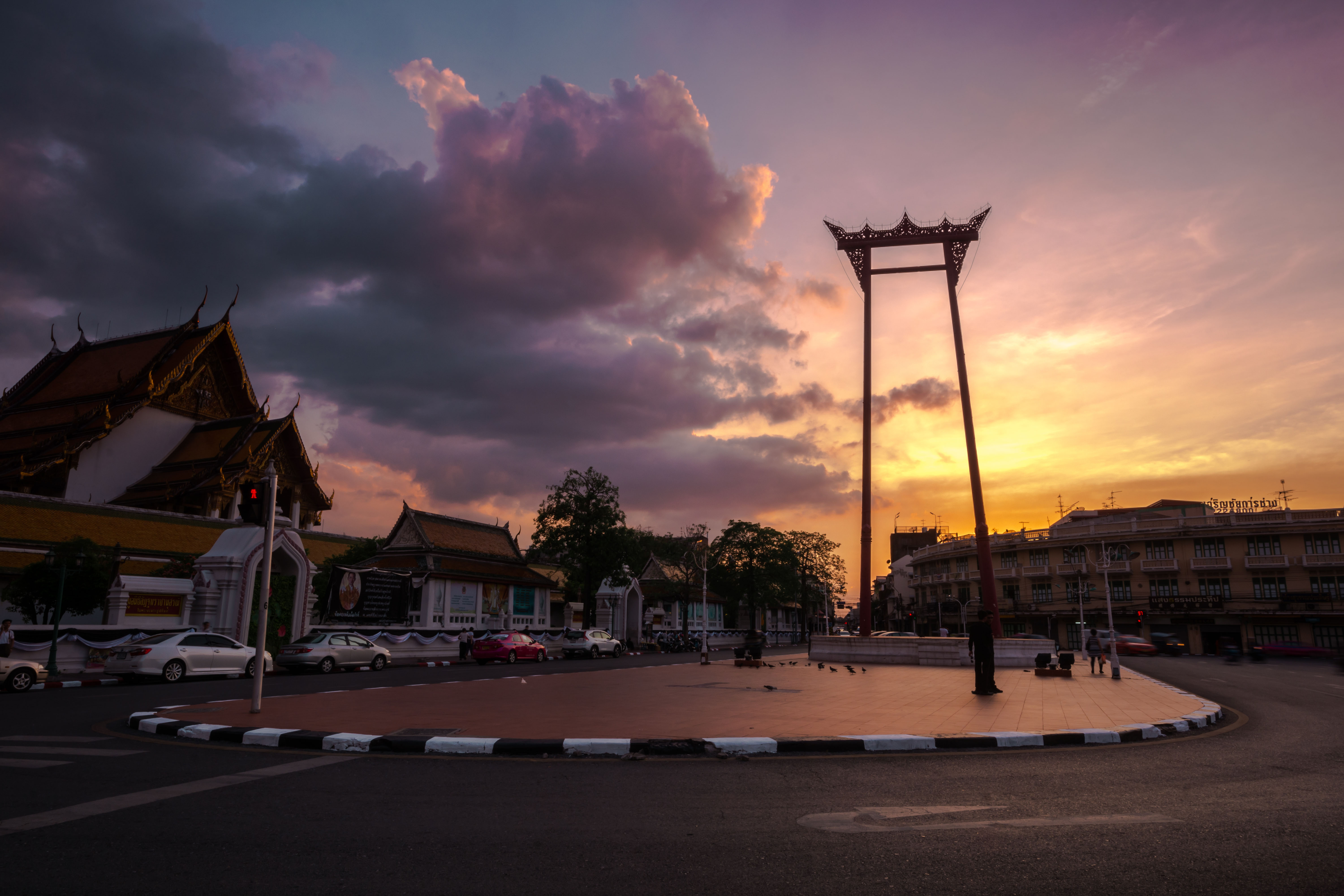
Sao Chingcha and Wat Suthat

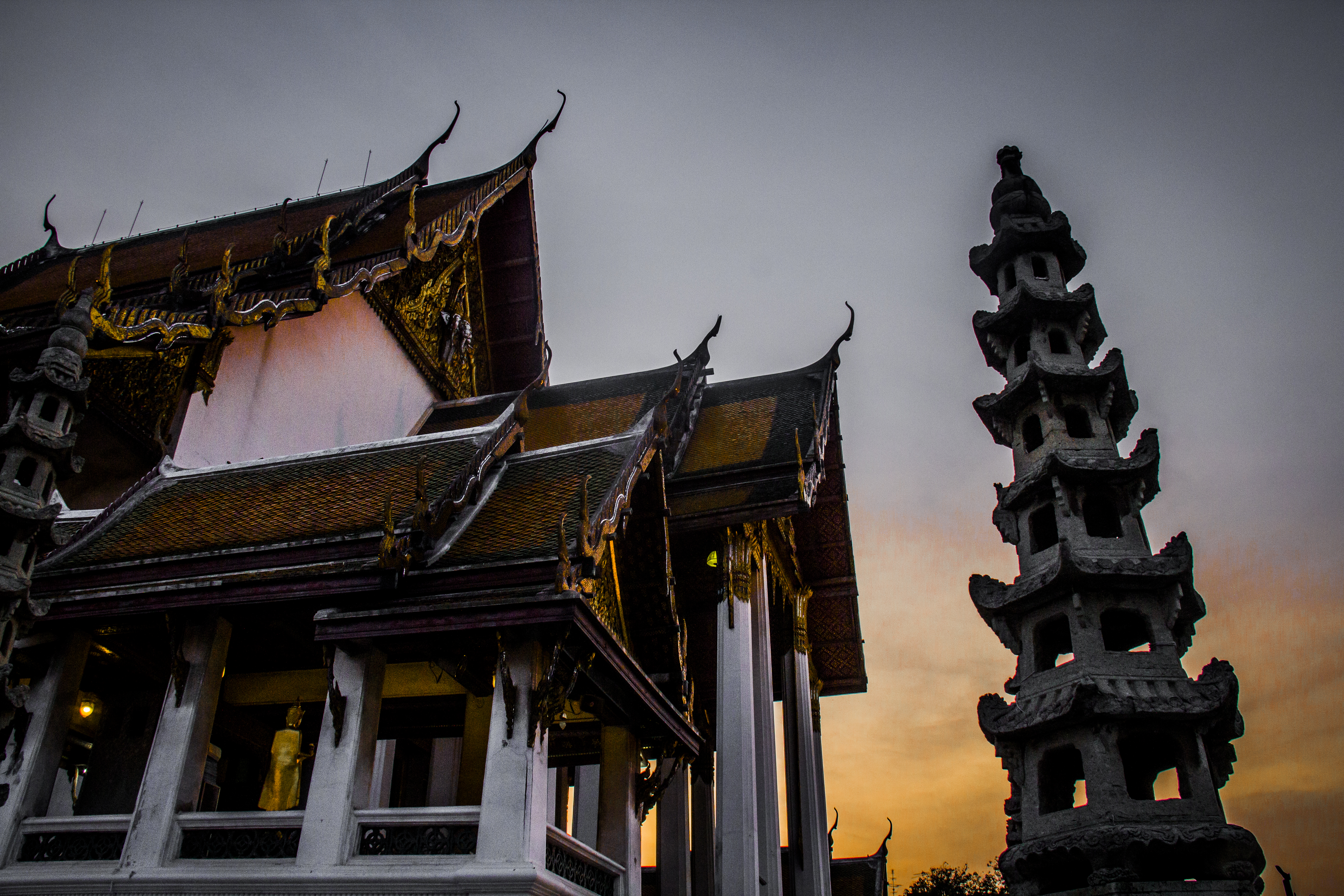
Wat Suthat

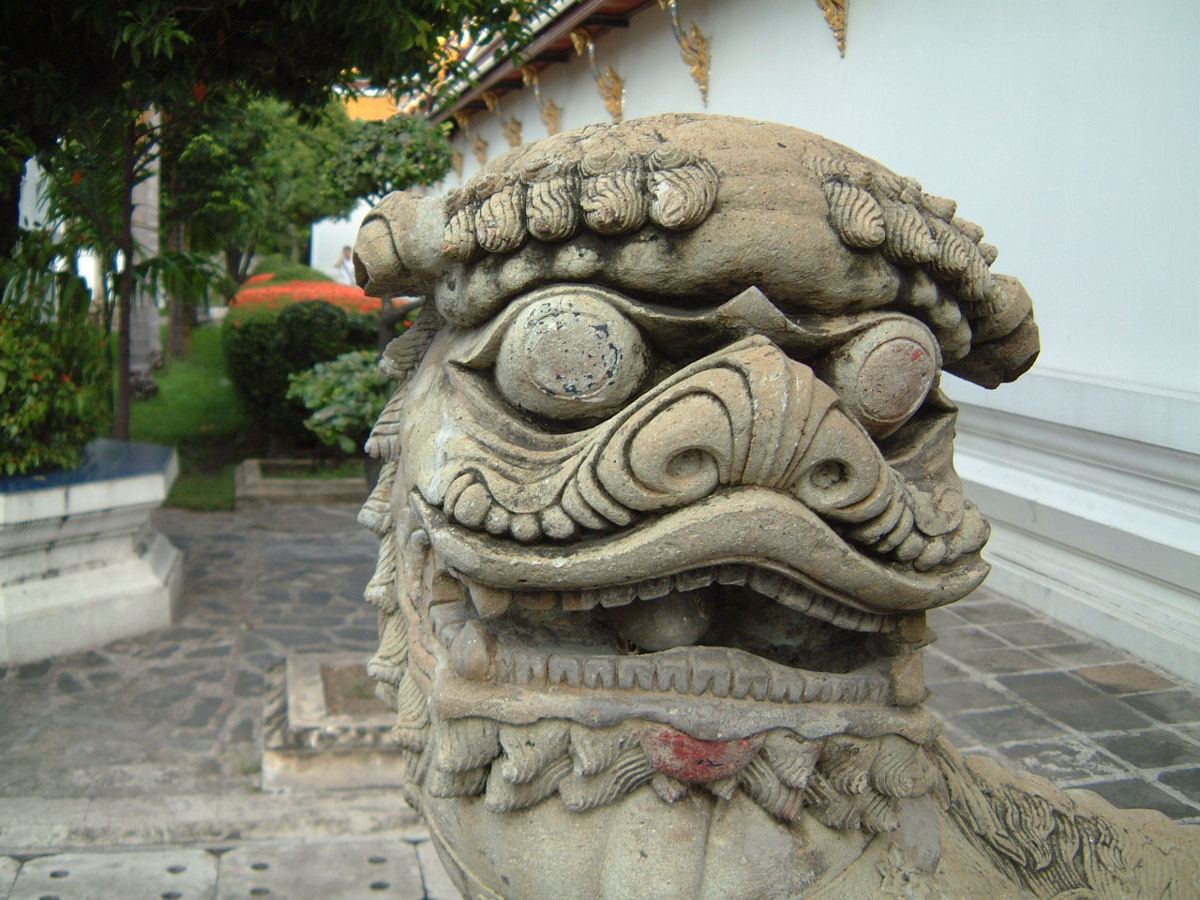
Chinese lion figure in Wat Suthat
