= Fueang Nakhon Road =

Street in Thailand

Coordinates: 13°44′57.67″N 100°29′53.09″E

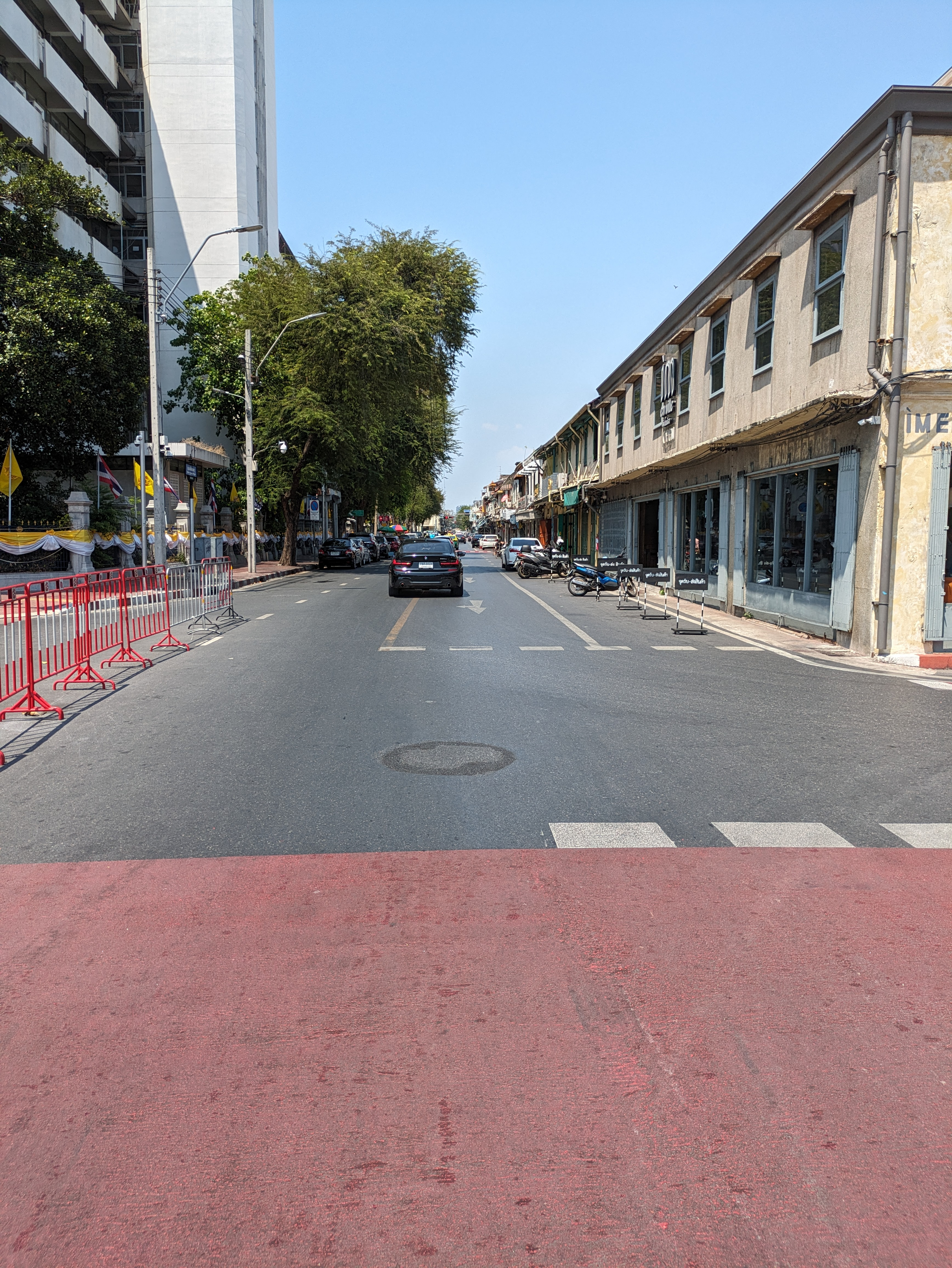
Fueang Nakhon Road in the area of Wat Ratchabophit and Ministry of Interior

Fueang Nakhon Road (Thai: ถนนเฟื่องนคร, pronounced [tʰā.nǒn fɯ̂a̯ŋ ná(ʔ).kʰɔ̄ːn]) is a road in inner Bangkok, or Rattanakosin Island. It is located in the Phra Nakhon district. The road is short, just 0.5 km (500 m) long, beginning at Si Kak Sao Chingcha in the south, passing Wat Ratchabophit and crossing Khlong Lot, and ending at Si Kak Phraya Si. It also connects to Ti Thong Road via Ratchabophit Road on the side of Wat Ratchabophit.

Fueang Nakhon was built using Western technology during the reign of King Mongkut (Rama IV) in 1863 and completed the following year. This was shortly after the construction of Charoen Krung and Bamrung Mueang Roads, making it one of the first formal roads in Thailand. Locals called it "Thanon Khwang" (ถนนขวาง, pronounced [tʰā.nǒn kʰwǎːŋ]) or "impeded road" because it lay across the paths of Charoen Krung and Bamrung Mueang Roads. Later, King Mongkut gave it the official name "Fueang Nakhon", meaning "prosperous city" or "the prosperity of the city". The name was also chosen to rhyme with the other two roads.

In the past, Fueang Nakhon extended farther north from Si Kak Sao Chingcha through Chao Por Suea Joss House, past Wat Mahannapharam and the area around the Democracy Monument on Ratchadamnoen Avenue, ending in front of Wat Bowonniwet in the Bang Lamphu area. This section was later renamed Tanao Road.

Along the present Fueang Nakhon Road, there are several historic shophouses built in the Neoclassical style, which was popular during the reigns of King Chulalongkorn (Rama V) and King Vajiravudh (Rama VI). Notably, there is a Krung Thai Bank branch housed in one of these buildings. Many of the shophouses are also home to old bookstores and printing houses; some have even been converted into boutique hotels catering to travelers.

Since 2017, Fueang Nakhon has been designated a one-way street, with traffic flowing from south to north, from Si Kak Phraya Si to Si Kak Sao Chingcha.
