= Sao Chingcha subdistrict =

Subdistrict of Phra Nakhon District, Bangkok

Coordinates: 13°45′02.0″N 100°29′46.1″E

Sao Chingcha เสาชิงช้า
- Khwaeng
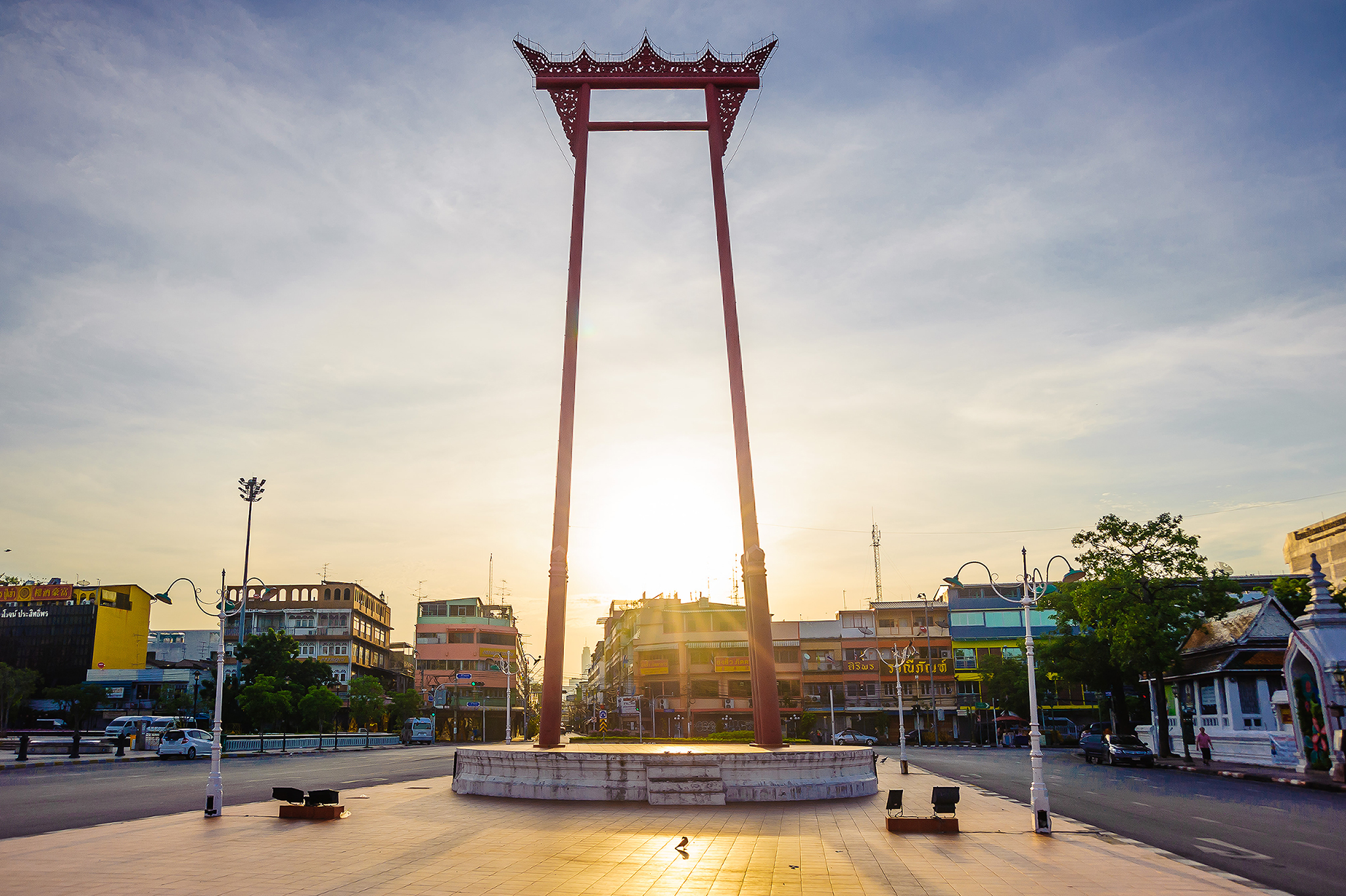
- The eponymous Sao Chingcha

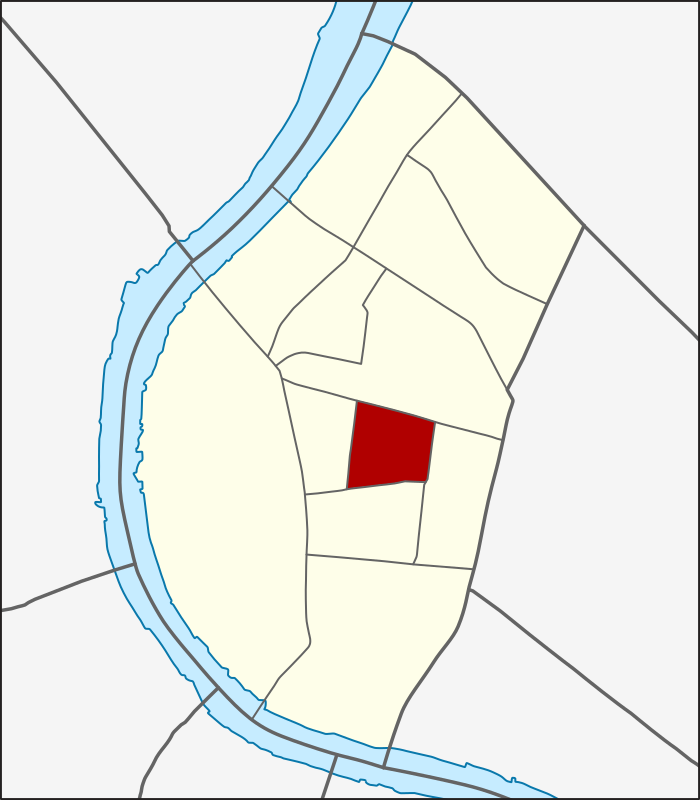
- Location in Phra Nakhon District
- Country: Thailand
- Province: Bangkok
- Khet: Phra Nakhon

Area
  - Total: 0.153 km^{2} (0.059 sq mi)

Population (2020)
  - Total: 2,049
- Time zone: UTC+7 (ICT)
- Postal code: 10200
- TIS 1099: 100106

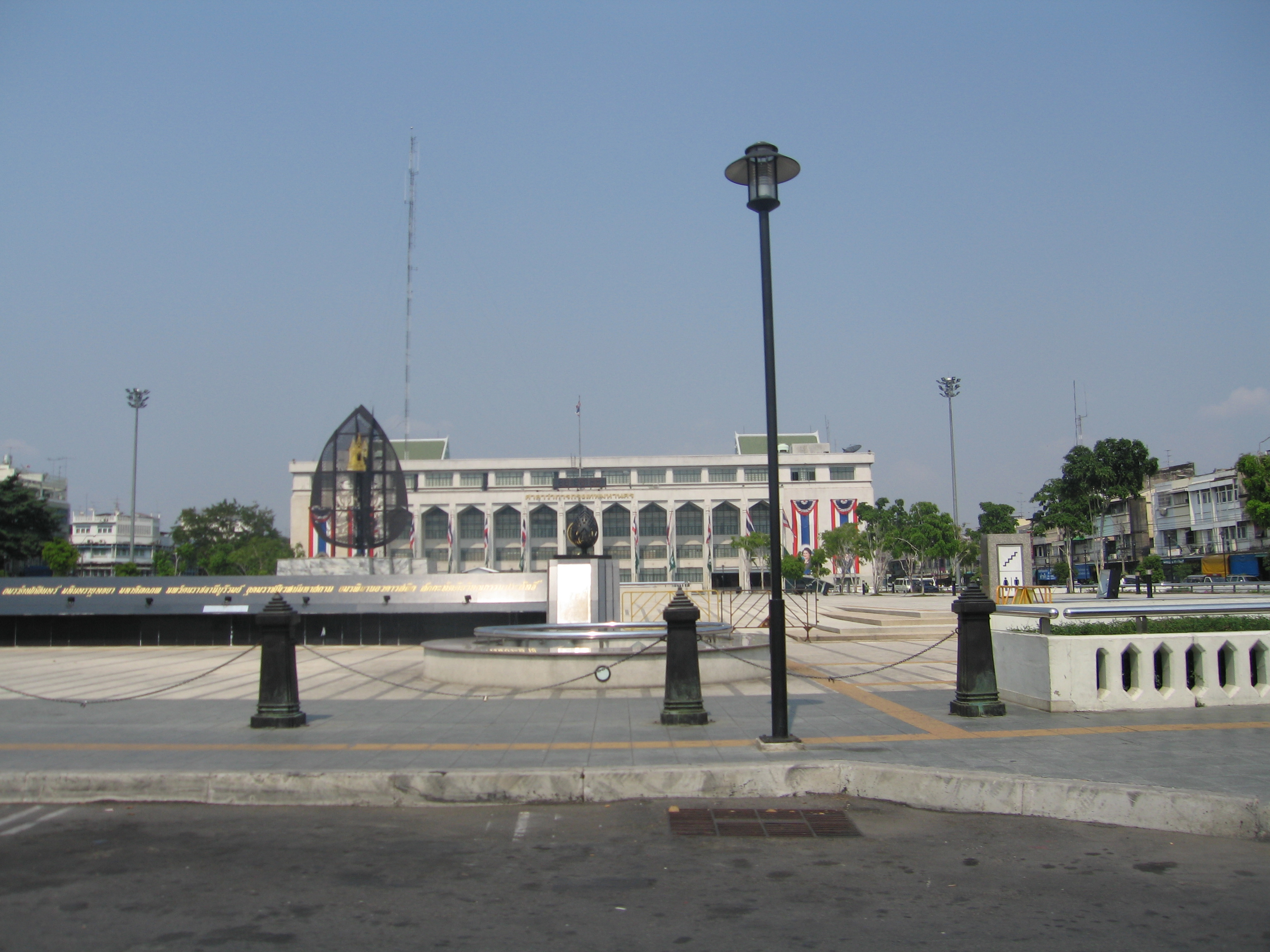
Bangkok City Hall and Townspeople Ground.

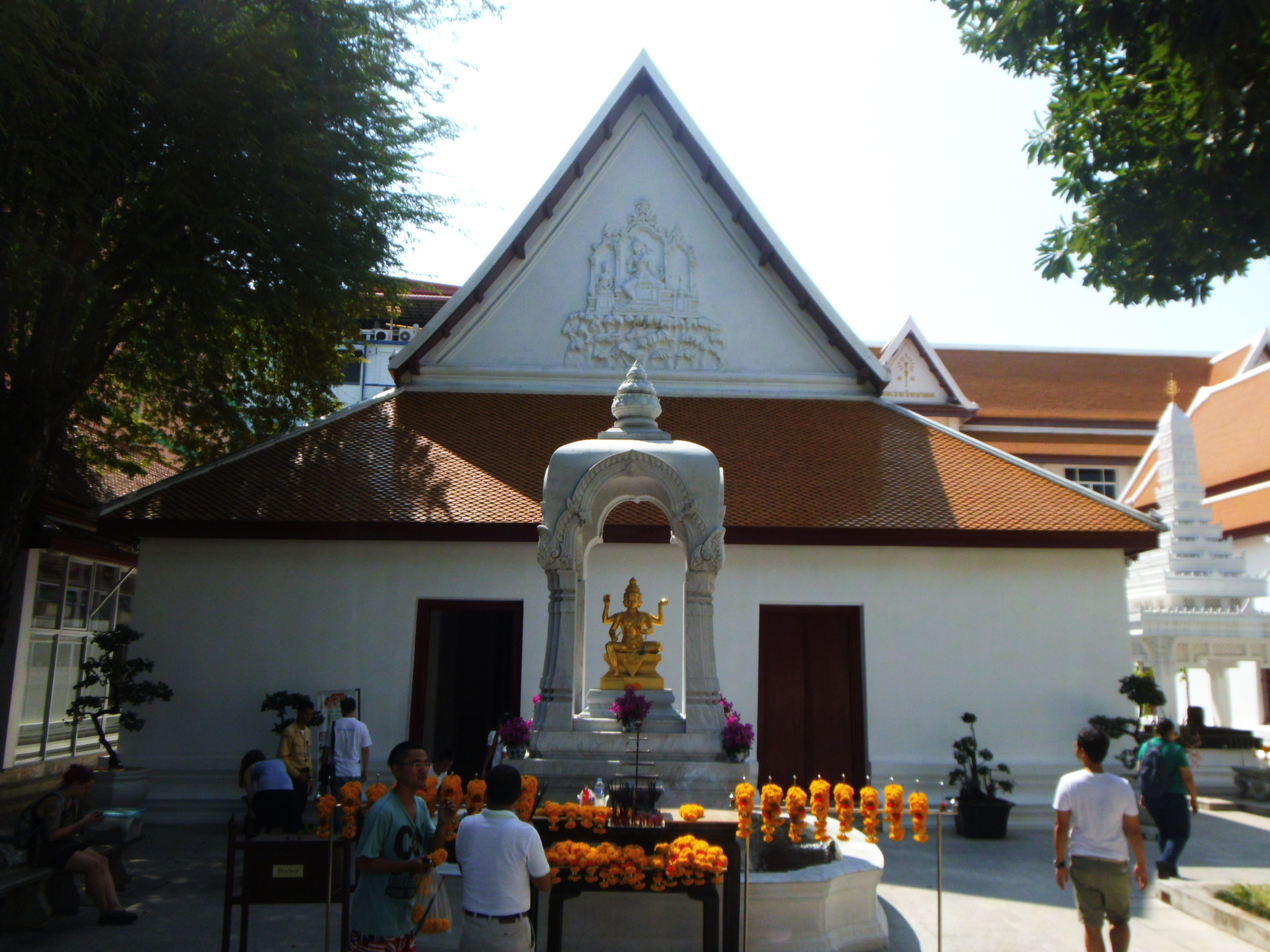
Brahma Shrine inside Devasathan.

Sao Chingcha (Thai: เสาชิงช้า, pronounced [sǎw t͡ɕʰīŋ.t͡ɕʰáː]) is one of the twelve khwaeng (subdistricts) of Phra Nakhon District, Bangkok.

== History ==
Its name after "Sao Chingcha" or internationally known as "Giant Swing", a towering structure in Hinduism. It was built in the early Rattanakosin era, after the establishment of Bangkok as the new capital by King Rama I, only two years. Sao Chingcha was created to perform a Hindu ritual known as "Triyampawai", believed to welcome Mahesh (Shiva) and Narayana (Vishnu) to visit the human world.

After the Siamese revolution in 1932, this ritual were reduced in importance, which was held for the last time in 1934 during King Rama VII's reign. Sao Chingcha has only moved slightly from its original location, and until 2024 it had been major renovated four times, most recently in 2006, when both pillars were completely replaced with wood transported from Den Chai District, Phrae Province. It was listed as a registered national ancient monument by Fine Arts Department in 1949.

Currently, Sao Chingcha is well known in one of Bangkok's symbols and landmarks.

The area around Sao Chingcha was formerly a community and market in the name of "Talat Sao Chingcha". In 1972 after amalgamating theactivities of the Metropolis of Krung Thep (Phra Nakhon) and Thon Buri, The Krung Thep and Thon Buri Provincial Administrations, the Metropolitan City Municipality and Sanitation Administration into the "Bangkok Metropolitan Administration" (BMA), Bangkok City Hall therefore was built on the site of Talat Sao Chingcha. It was designed by a Thai architect Prince Samaichalerm Kridakorn. Traders of Talat Sao Chingcha had to move to a new location, which is the nearby Talat Trok Mo in present-day.

== Geography ==
Sao Chingcha is considered to be an area in the inner city of Bangkok or Rattanakosin Island.

It is bordered by neighbouring subdistricts (from the north clockwise): Bowon Niwet (Khlong Lot Wat Ratchanadda is a divider line), Samran Rat (Siriphong Road is a divider line), Wat Ratchabophit (Bamrung Mueang Road is a divider line), San Chao Pho Suea (Tanao Road is a divider line), respectively. All in its district.

A world-class tourist attraction Wat Suthat, indeed, it is located in the area of Wat Ratchabophit.

== Places ==
- Giant Swing
- Devasathan
- Bangkok City Hall and Townspeople Ground
- Wat Mahannapharam
