= Baan Varnakovida =

Coordinates: 13.7564°N 100.4995°E

Baan Varnakovida บ้านวรรณโกวิท
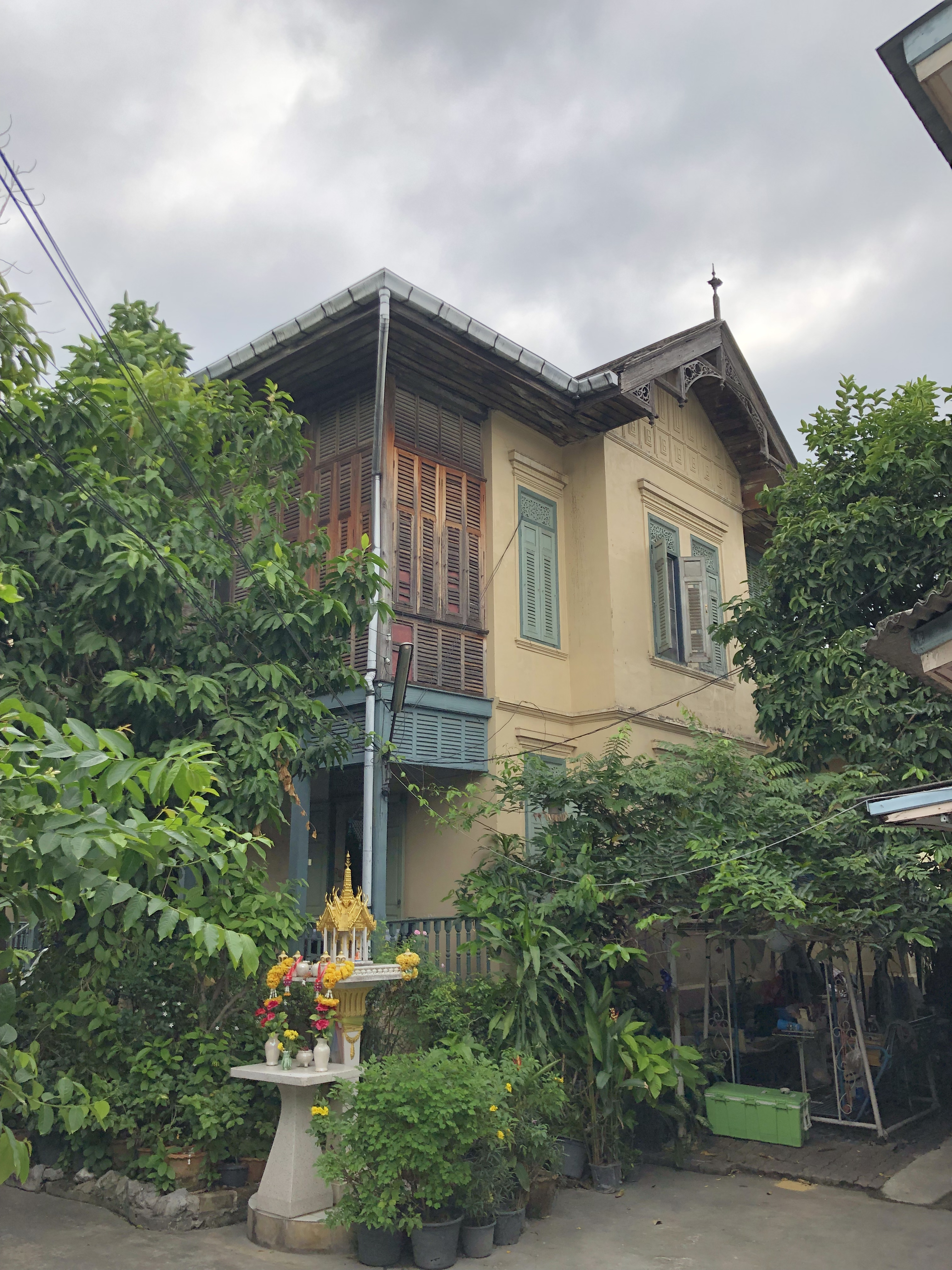
- Interactive map of Baan Varnakovida บ้านวรรณโกวิท

Restaurant information
- Owner: Apavinee Indaransi
- Location: 64 Tanao Road, Wat Bowon Niwet, Phra Nakhon, Bangkok

Baan Varnakovida (Thai: บ้านวรรณโกวิท, RTGS: Ban Wankowit) is a restaurant in Phra Nakhon, Bangkok, Thailand, specializing in pre-war Siamese cuisine. Owned by Apavinee Indaransi, Baan Varnakovida is housed in a Rama VI-era gingerbread house on Tanao Road. The 2-acre lot was bestowed on Indaransi's grandfather, Luang (หลวง) Krachang Varnakovida, for serving as a royal chancellor to King Rama VI. The restaurant is known for khao chae (Thai: ข้าวแช่), jasmine rice soaked in flower-infused water served with accompaniments. Other notable dishes include khao khluk kapi (Thai: ข้าวคลุกกะปิ) and khanom chin sao nam (Thai: ขนมจีนซาวน้ำ).
