= Talat Yot =

Coordinates: 13°45′38.4″N 100°29′57.4″E

Talat Yot ตลาดยอด
- Khwaeng
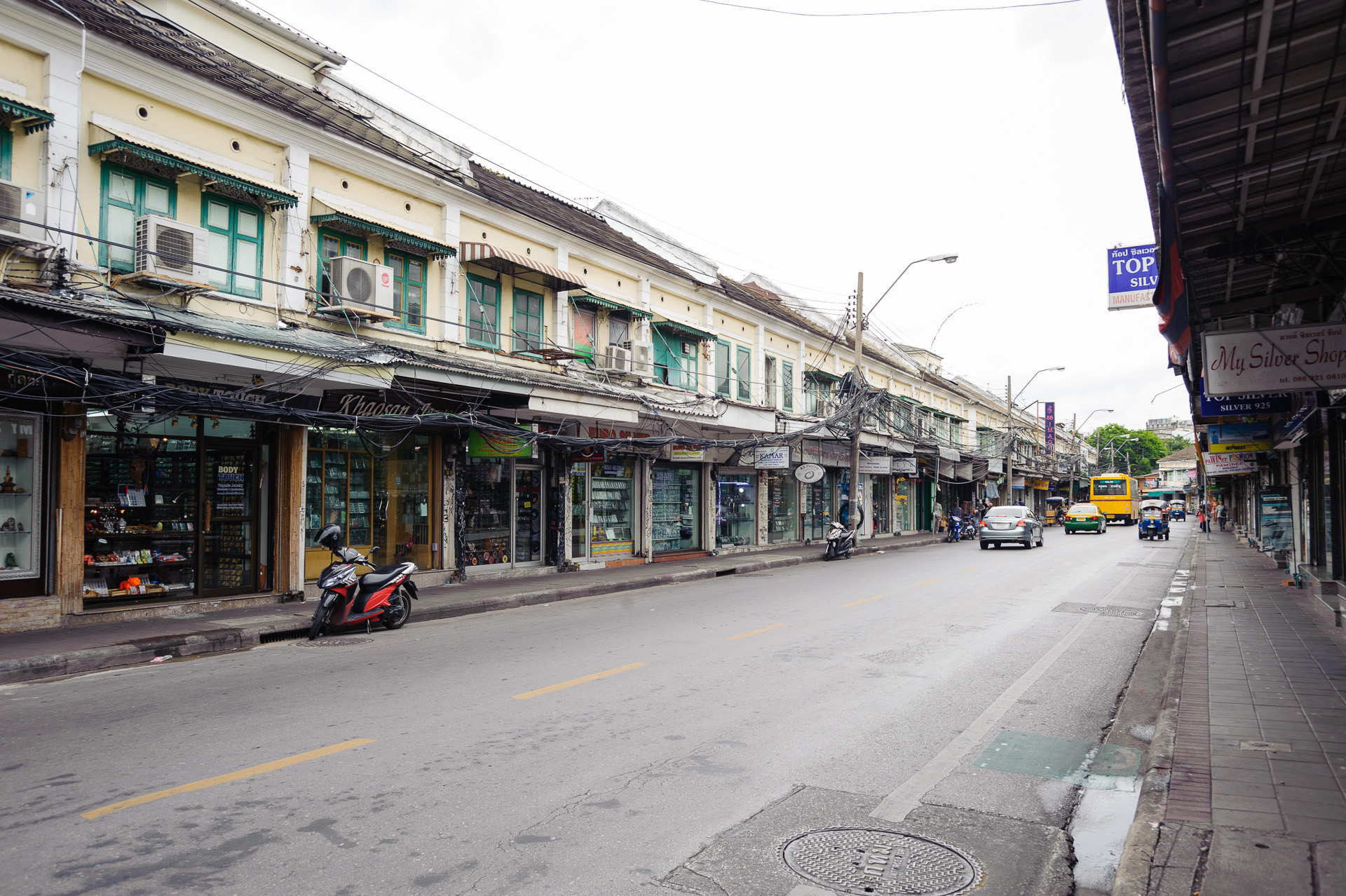
- Tanao Road in the phase near Khaosan and Sap Sam Hang Roads

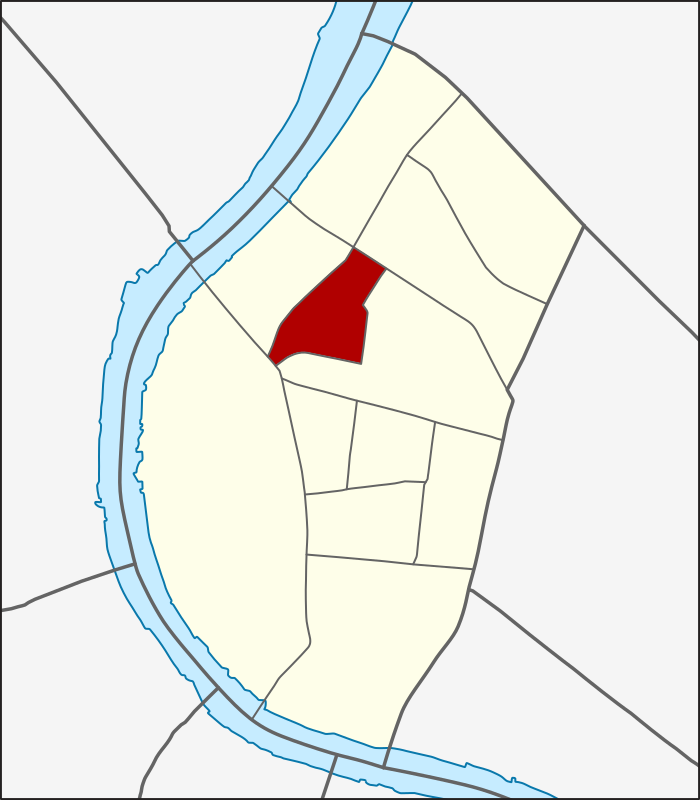
- Location in Phra Nakhon District
- Country: Thailand
- Province: Bangkok
- Khet: Phra Nakhon

Area
  - Total: 0.193 km^{2} (0.075 sq mi)

Population (2020)
  - Total: 2,134
- Time zone: UTC+7 (ICT)
- Postal code: 10200
- TIS 1099: 100108

Talat Yot (Thai: ตลาดยอด, pronounced [tā.làːt jɔ̂ːt]) is a khwaeng (subdistrict) of Phra Nakhon District, Bangkok, considered to be majority area of Bang Lamphu neighbourhood.

== History ==
Its name after Talat Yot, a large marketplace that used to be located in this area. It was also known as Bang Lumphu. At the beginning it was just a small market, later during the reign of King Nangklao (Rama III) it grew into a bigger market, and there was a major improvement in the year 1902.

Talat Yot was a large market in the inner Bangkok (Rattanakosin Island) in those days. There was a wide variety of goods trading, such as both fresh and dried foods, flowers, incenses and candles, various Thai desserts, gold and jewelry stores, leather stores, fabric shops. They starting from small stores and successively develop, until the reign of King Vajiravudh (Rama VI) therefore became an important trading centre to date. Moreover, there was another important market near Talat Yot called Talat Norarat, a fruit market outside Rattanakosin Island.

In the 1970s, Bang Lamphu consists of three main markets, namely Talat Yot, Talat Turian (durian market), and Talat Nana. For Talat Nana, its name is derived from the surname of Lek Nana, a Thai-Indian politician and real estate entrepreneur, who was an owner. It closed down in the 1980s.

== Geography ==
Neighbouring subdistricts are (from the north clockwise): Wat Sam Phraya, Ban Phan Thom (across Khlong Bang Lamphu), Bowon Niwet, Phra Borom Maha Ratchawang, and Chana Songkhram.

== Places ==
- Khaosan Road
- Rambuttri Road and Rong Mai Lane
- Tang Hua Seng Department Store
- Phra Sumen Road
- Tani Road
- Chakrabongse Road
- Kraisi Road and Kraisi Alley
- Sip Sam Hang Road
- Chana Songkhram Metropolitan Police Station
- Tanao Road
- Ratchadamnoen Avenue
- Khok Wua Intersection
- Norarat Sathan Bridge
- BMA Parking Garage
