= Sip Sam Hang Road =

Street in Talat Yot, Bangkok, Thailand

Coordinates: 13.760640°N 100.499257°E

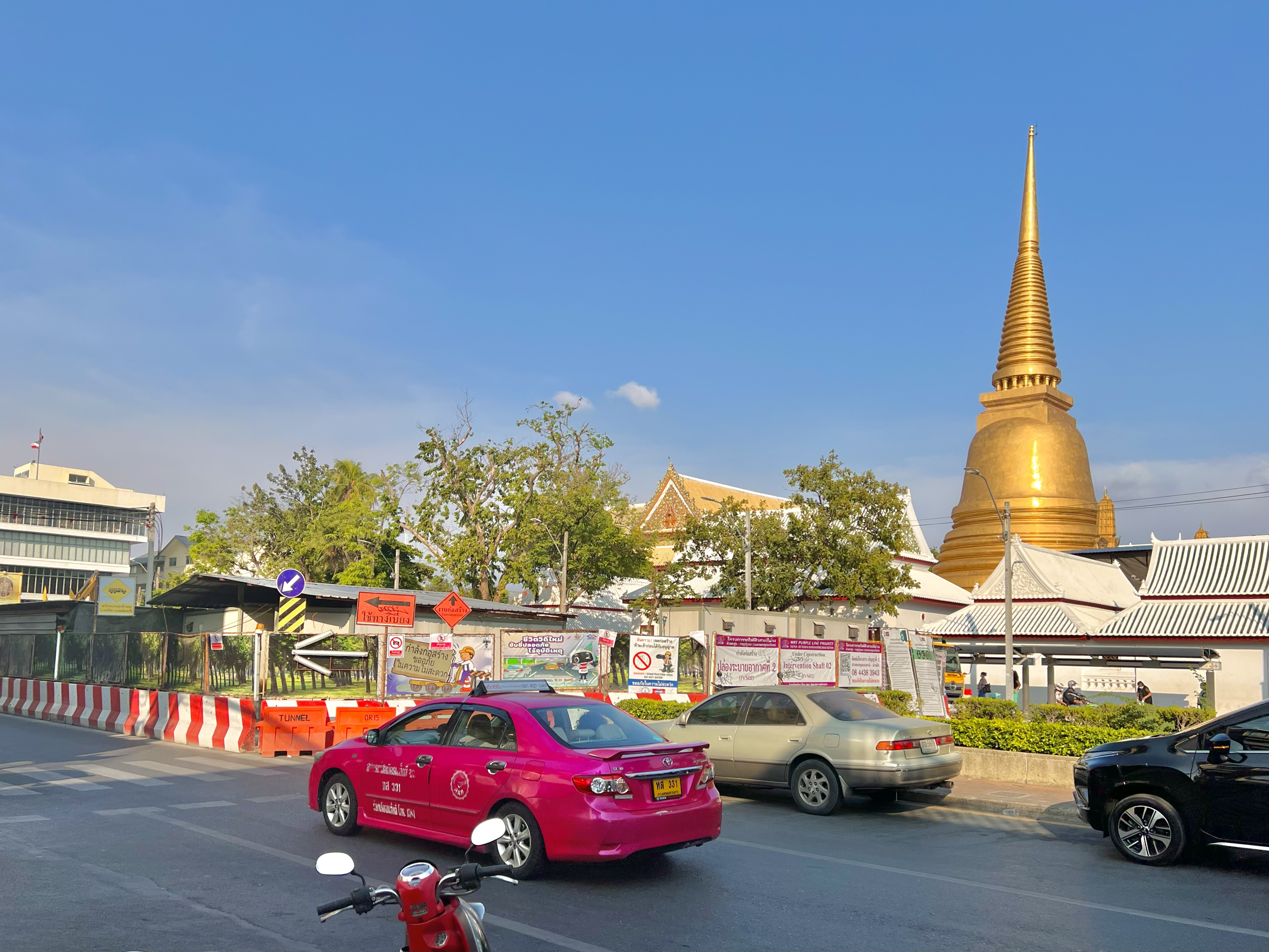
Sip Sam Hang Road during construction of MRT Purple Line in March 2023

Sip Sam Hang Road (Thai: ถนนสิบสามห้าง, pronounced [tʰānǒn sìp sǎːm hâːŋ]) is a short street 165 m (541.3 ft) long in the Bang Lamphu area in Talat Yot Subdistrict of Phra Nakhon District, Bangkok.

The street was divided into two sections like a roundabout. In the eastern side was later renamed "Bowon Niwet Road" (Note: Spelling according to road sign.) (ถนนบวรนิเวศน์, pronounced [tʰānǒn bɔwɔːn níʔwêːt]) after the name of Wat Bowonniwet, that it runs through. Phra Sumen Road cuts through its northern end. While the southern end is shaped like a traffic circle, where Tanao, Rambuttri, Tani Roads, and itself meet.

Its name literally translates to "13 department stores". It comes from the fact that Guangdong Province in China, back in the day and there were 13 stores or 13 firms in a trading centre and were referred to as the guild. They were an association that supported each other. When the Chinese came to Siam (present-day Thailand) to trade they set up the guild system to support their businesses here too. They built a trade centre just as in Guangdong and it is supposed that is why the road it called. The trade centre has long been demolished but this name is still remains. It is often believed that there were actually 13 Chinese stores that once stood here. There is no evidence to confirm this assumption. The shophouses along the street as seen today were built during the King Rama VII's reign and the King Rama IX's reign. They were rebuilt from the original buildings that had been built since the King Rama IV's reign. These shophouses are believed to be the first shophouses in the Bang Lamphu and has contributed to the area's prosperity as a commercial district until the present.

Sip Sam Hang Road used to be a pocket park-style island in the middle. It was built in 1976 by filling in an area that had previously been a canal. Before that, it was a bomb shelter during World War II. It was two rectangular reinforced concrete buildings with many ventilation shafts. It could hold about 50 people. Later, when the war was over, Bangkok Municipality (present-day Bangkok Metropolitan Administration) then dismantled the chest to build a public toilet. Until early 2022, it was dismantled to make way for the construction of the Southern MRT Purple Line extension (Tao Poon–Rat Burana route).

Bang Lamphu and Sip Sam Hang Road considered as a hangout spot of youngsters in the 1950s to the 1960s same as Wang Burapha. Since it was home to many restaurants including cafés and ice cream parlours that offer jukebox and television, which were rare appliances in those days. It was also the point of departure for at least three bus lines until now. Hence, Sip Sam Hang Road was mentioned in the 1997 Thai period movie Dang Bireley's and Young Gangsters as a backdrop for the characters in street gang battles.

On 7 January 2025, Cambodian politician Lim Kimya was shot dead on the street at 05:45 pm.
