= Khok Wua =

Crossroads on Rattanakosin Island, Bangkok, Thailand

Coordinates: 13°45′26.15″N 100°29′56.20″E

- คอกวัว
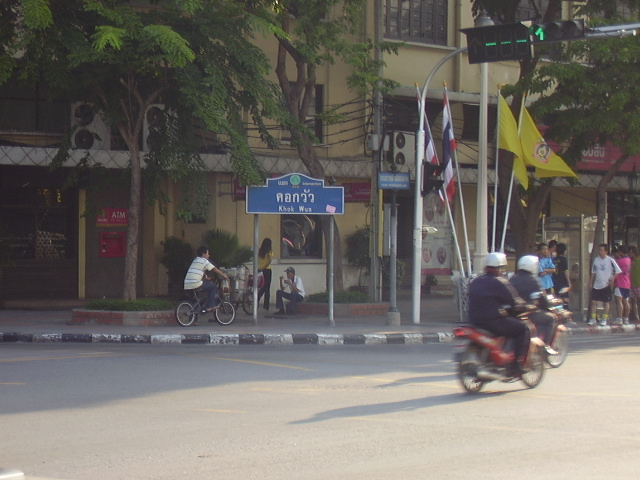
- Intersection sign on south corner, mid-2007

Location
- Bowon Niwet and Talat Yot, Phra Nakhon, Bangkok, Thailand
- Roads at junction: Tanao (north); Ratchadamnoen (east–west); Tanao (south)

Construction
- Type: Four-way at-grade intersection

Khok Wua (Thai: คอกวัว, pronounced [kʰɔ̂ːk wūa̯]) is an intersection in Bangkok. It is a four-way crossroads of Ratchadamnoen (section middle Ratchadamnoen) and Tanao roads in area of Bowon Niwet and Talat Yot sub-districts, Phra Nakhon district within Rattanakosin Island.

The term "Khok Wua" means "cattle stable," reflecting the area's function during the reign of King Nangklao (Rama III), when it served as pasture and grove land with Hindu cow stables that supplied milk for the King's morning alms to the monks at the nearby Grand Palace. Later, during the reign of King Chulalongkorn (Rama V), the stables were demolished, and the area became the residences of Muslims who emigrated from southern Thailand. Evidence of the earlier residents remains, including two mosques in nearby Bang Lamphu: Masjid Chakraphong and Masjid Ban Tuk Din. The area is also mentioned in Raden Landai (ระเด่นลันได), a satirical comic literature that humorously depicted the lives of Hindus who lived there at the time.

The intersection on Ratchadamnoen Avenue, near Democracy Monument, has historically been a focal point for political gatherings in Thailand, including the October 14, 1973 incident, Black May (1992), People's Alliance for Democracy (PAD) protests in 2006 and 2008, United Front for Democracy Against Dictatorship (UDD) protests in 2009 and 2010, and People's Democratic Reform Committee (PDRC) protests (2013–14). In the past, it was surrounded by many important buildings, such as the Government Lottery Office (GLO), the Public Relations Department, Sala Chaloem Thai Theater, Government Savings Bank Headquarters, and Thai Thorathat Company Headquarters (now MCOT).

Today, there are many places of interest nearby, including the 14 October 1973 Memorial and the Bangkok City Library.
