= Si Kak Phraya Si =

Coordinates: 13°44′50.06″N 100°29′51.55″E

- สี่กั๊กพระยาศรี
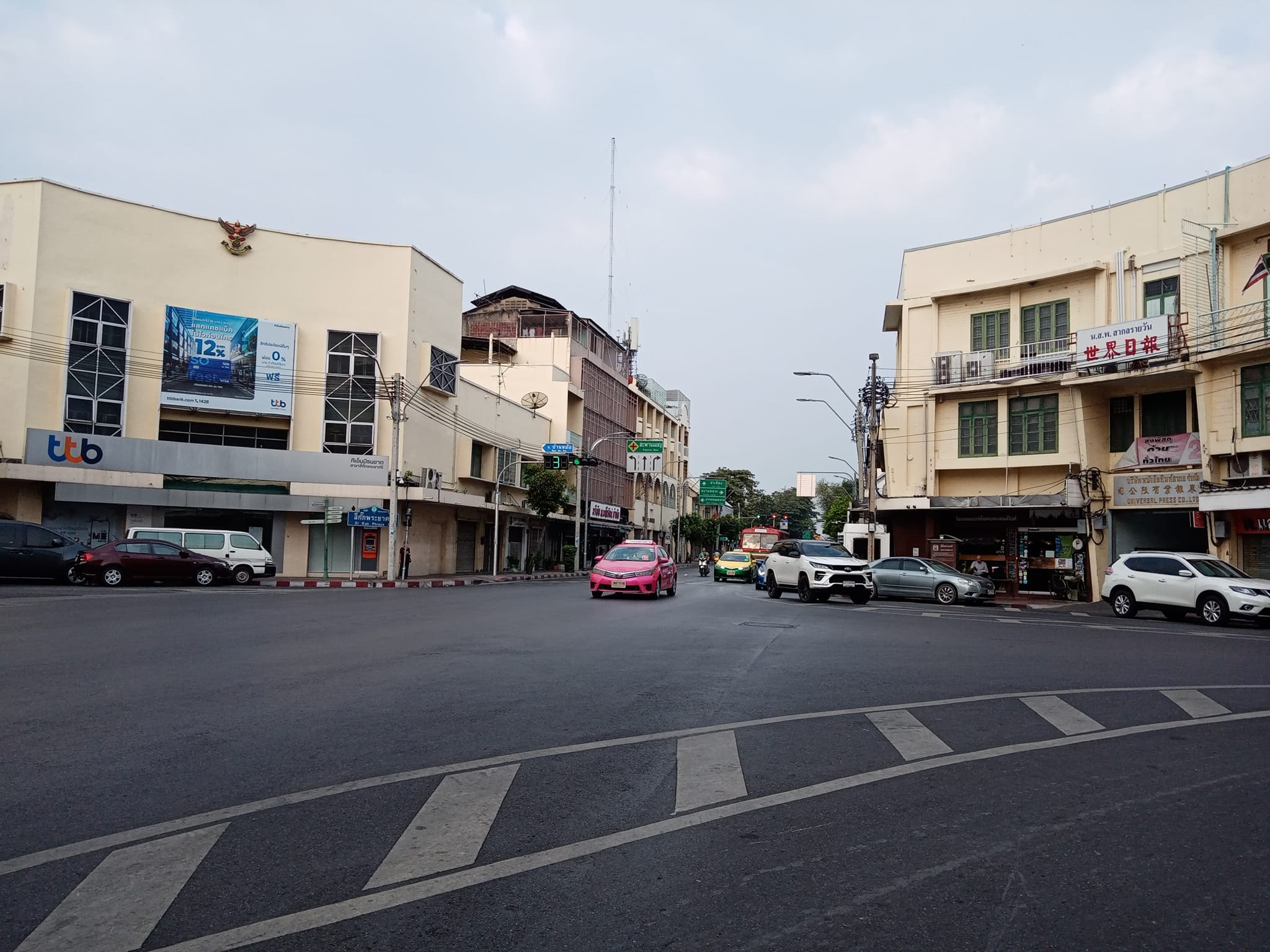
- Si Kak Phraya Si on March 2, 2024, looking back towards Saphan Mon

Location
- Wang Burapha Phirom, Phra Nakhon, Bangkok, Thailand
- Roads at junction: Fueang Nakhon (north); Charoen Krung (east–west); Ban Mo (south)

Construction
- Type: Four-way at-grade intersection

Si Kak Phraya Si (Thai: สี่กั๊กพระยาศรี, pronounced [sìː kák pʰrā.jāː sǐː]) is an intersection located in the Wang Burapha Phirom sub-district, Phra Nakhon district, Bangkok. It connects Charoen Krung, Fueang Nakhon, and Ban Mo roads. This intersection is considered the second along Charoen Krung Road, the first official street in Thailand, following nearby Saphan Mon (Mon Bridge).

The name "Si Kak Phraya Si" can be interpreted as "Phraya Si's intersection". The term derives from the Teochew words "角" (Kak), meaning "corner" or "angle," and "四" (Si), meaning "four", referring to a four-way intersection. Phraya Si (พระยาศรี) was a Mon nobleman who resided in this neighbourhood. He was an aristocrat and held a teak trade concession during the reign of King Mongkut (Rama IV). Phraya Si also led the construction of Charoen Krung Road and Saphan Mon Bridge.

Additionally, Soi Phraya Si (Phraya Si Alley) is named in his honour. This alley connects Fueang Nakhon and Atsadang roads to Saphan Hok (the Lifting Bridge), a pedestrian bridge over Khlong Khu Mueang Doem. This area was also the site of Thailand's first department store, Harry A. Badman and Co., established in 1899 by British businessman Mr. Harry A. Badman during the reign of King Chulalongkorn (Rama V).

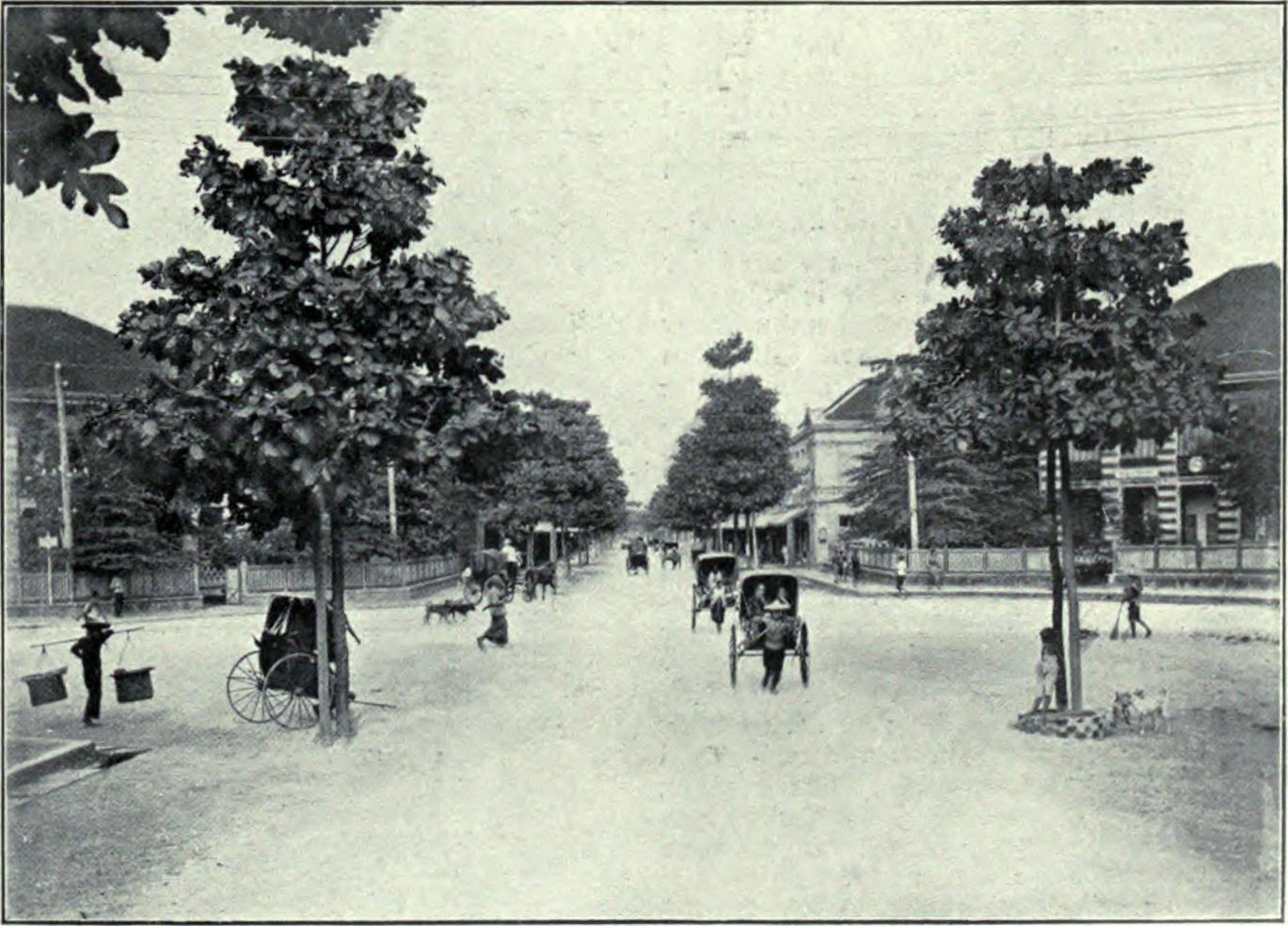
Atmosphere of Si Kak Phraya Si along Charoen Krung road during the King Chulalongkorn (Rama V)'s reign circa 1900

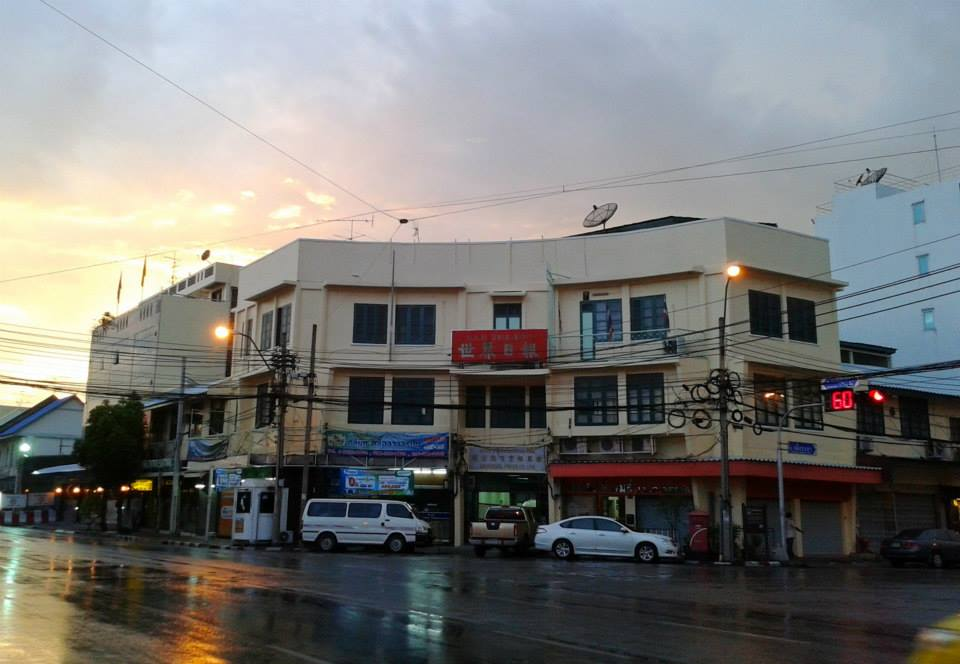
Universe Daily Newspaper headquarters in 2015 (now Bangkok Bed and Bike Hostel)

The name "Si Kak Phraya Si" originates from the Chinese rickshaw pullers who passed through this area during the reign of King Mongkut, and it has remained the official name ever since. To this day, there are only two intersections in Bangkok that retain the prefix "Si Kak": this one and Si Kak Sao Chingcha, located further north.

Si Kak Phraya Si was also the site of Thailand's first café, the "Red Cross Tea Room", established in 1917 by Madam Cole (Edna S. Cole), an American woman and the founder of Kullasatri Wanglang School (now Wattana Wittaya Academy). The café was opened during World War I to raise funds for the Red Cross in support of the Allied forces. In 1921, during a period that promoted both western boxing and Muay Thai, several boxing arenas were established across Bangkok, including one at Si Kak Phraya Si known as Si Ayutthaya Stadium. Prior to the 1932 revolution, this area was home to many upscale restaurants catering to foreigners and the Thai elite, similar to other prominent Bangkok neighbourhoods such as Ratchawong in Chinatown, Silom, Surawong, and Si Phraya in Bangrak.

Additionally, at the northwest corner of the intersection stands the headquarters of Universe Daily Newspaper (Chinese: 世界日報, pinyin: Shì Jiè Rì Bào), a Chinese-language newspaper founded by Chin Sophonpanich in 1955. It was one of the few Chinese-language broadsheets in Thailand. After 69 years of operation, the newspaper ceased publication on January 1, 2025.

== Places ==
The neighbourhood around the intersection was home to several historic properties.

=== The Bangkok Central Books Depot ===
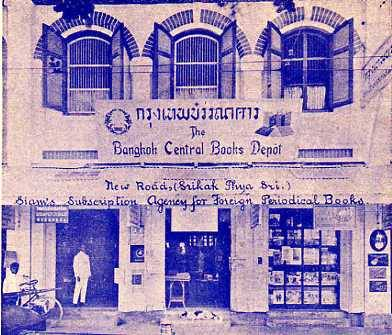
The Bangkok Central Books Depot, c. 1930s

The Bangkok Central Books Depot (กรุงเทพบรรณาคาร, Krungthep Bannakhan, pronounced [krūŋ.tʰêːp ban.náː.kāːn]) was a bookshop and publisher, occupying a shophouse on Charoen Krung Road between the Si Kak Phraya Si and Saphan Than Intersection (now known as Chaloem Krung) to the east. The building was previously the practice of Takeda, a Japanese doctor. The bookshop opened there around 1932, after Phraya Niphonphotchanat (Santi Wichittranon), the head of the Royal Secretariat Department, left government service following the abolition of absolute monarchy. It was a leading bookshop at the time, mostly selling academic titles. Among other titles, it printed So Sethaputra's New Model English–Thai Dictionary and W.A.R. Wood's A History of Siam. The building was bombed during World War II, killing its owner, but his daughter later re-opened the shop in a nearby location; it is now known as Nibondh & Co., Ltd.
