= Tanao Road =

Road in Phra Nakhon District, Bangkok

Coordinates: 13°45′20.29″N 100°29′56.45″E

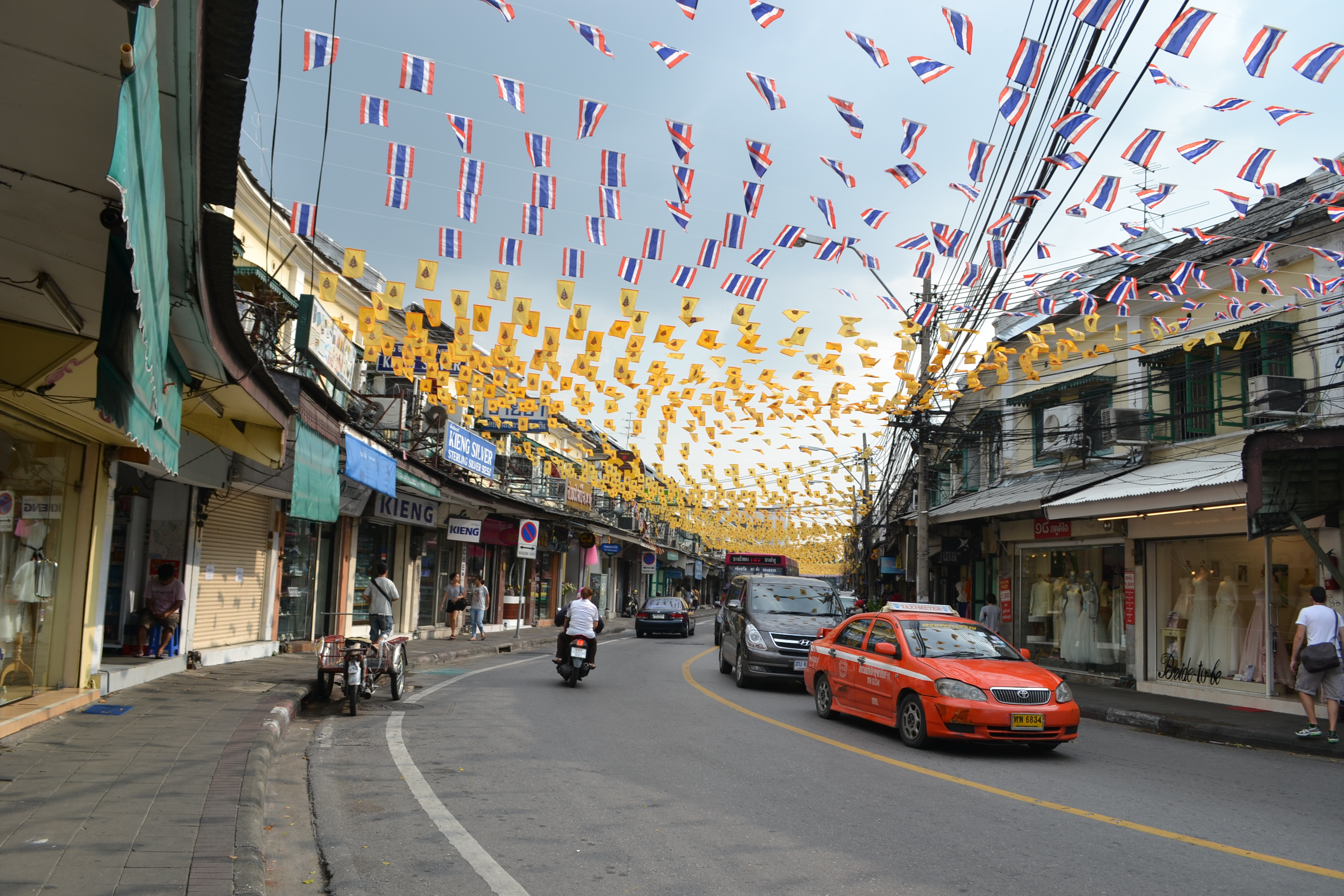
Tanao Road near Khao San Road

Tanao Road (Thai: ถนนตะนาว, RTGS: Thanon Tanao, pronounced [tʰā.nǒn tā.nāːw]) is a road in Phra Nakhon District, Bangkok. Starting from Bamrung Mueang Road at Si Kak Sao Chingcha straight to the north, it is also a boundary line between the San Chao Pho Suea and Sao Chingcha Subdistricts, then spans the Khlong Lot into the area of Bowon Niwet Subdistrict, then cut across Ratchadamnoen Avenue at Khok Wua Intersection, where it forms a dividing line between the Bowon Niwet and Talat Yot Subdistricts, as far as bend to the roundabout where Sip Sam Hang, Tani, Rambuttri, and Bowon Niwet Roads converge in Bang Lamphu area near Khao San Road.

Originally, Tanao Road was a northern end of Fueang Nakhon Road, which King Chulalongkorn (Rama VI) to be built in the year 1863–64. There was a presumption that the name of Tanao Road will be based on the Tenasserim people (Tenasserim in Thai is known as "Tanao" or "Tanao Si") that the king ordered to settle at this road, so-called Ban Tanao Si, Tanao Si or Tanao Roads etc. But some people assume that comes from this road cutting through the aromatic herb shop area, which this herb was called "Tanao" (a kind of sachet).

Although it is a short road, but Tanao Road runs through many important places are Sam Phraeng neighbourhood, San Chao Pho Suea, Wat Mahannapharam, 14 October 73 Memorial and Bangkok City Library.

The area is notable for its food, particularly heritage restaurants serving dishes originating in palaces, including Baan Varnakovida and Kor Panich.
