= Bowon Niwet subdistrict =

Bowon Niwet บวรนิเวศ
- Khwaeng
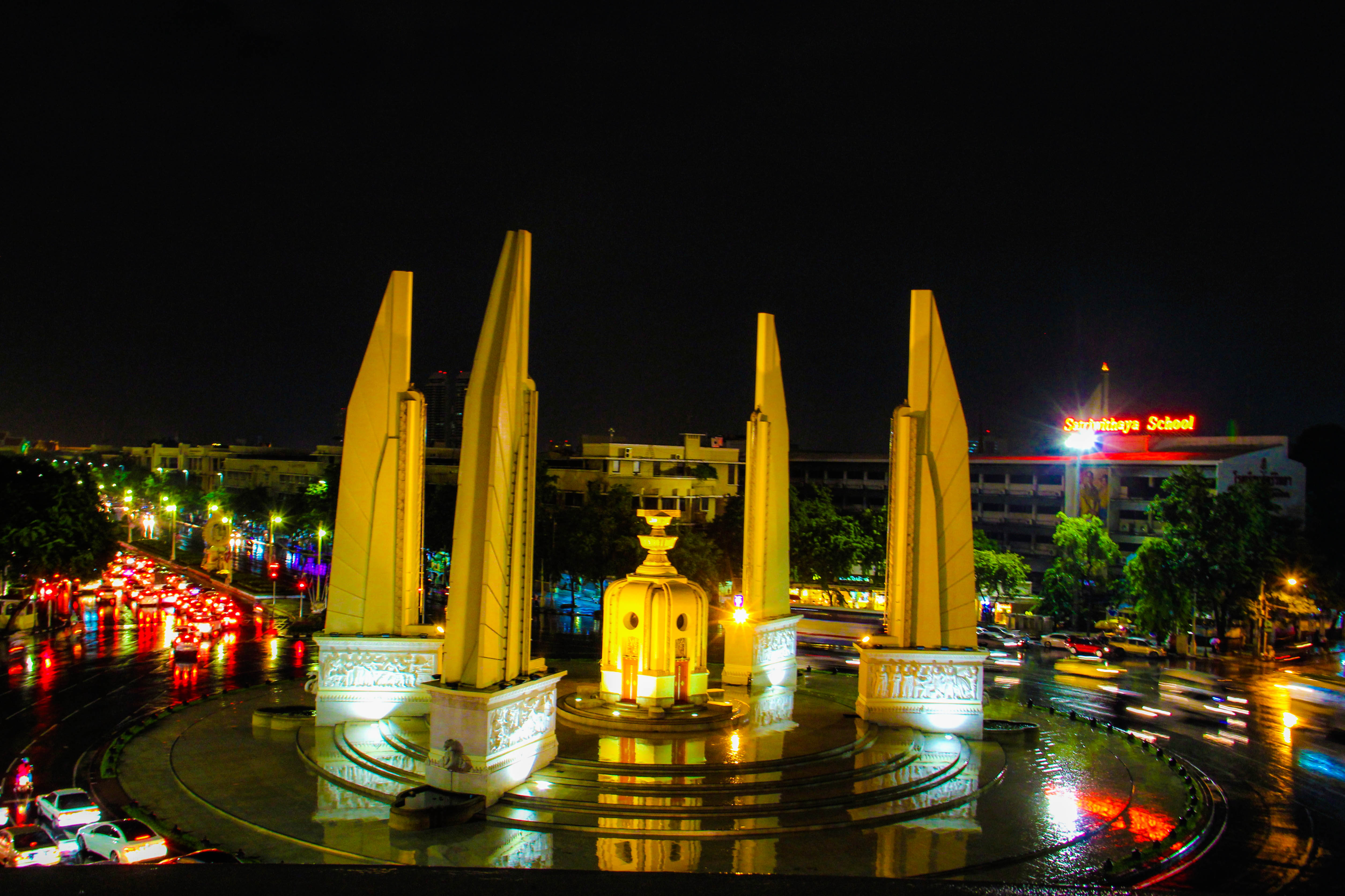
- Democracy Monument

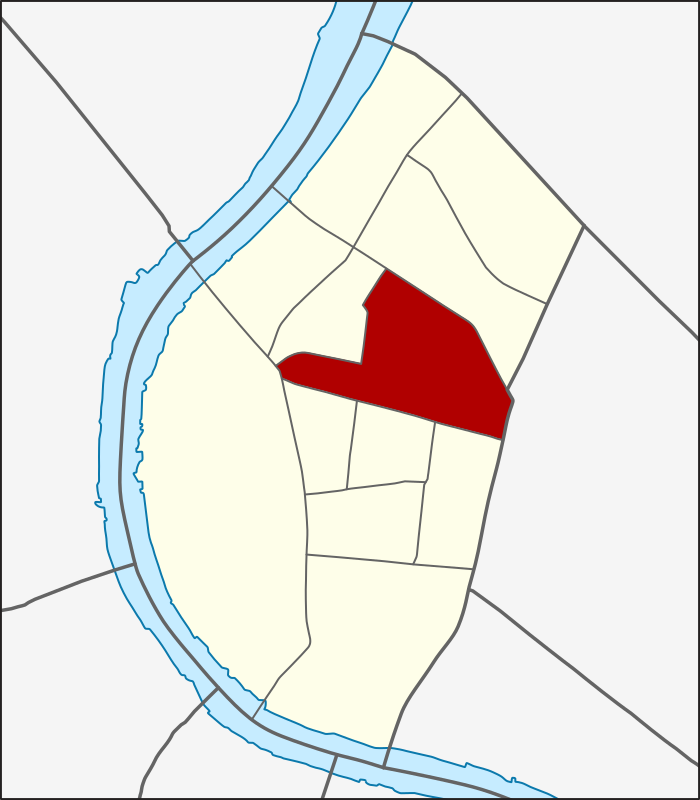
- Location in Phra Nakhon District
- Country: Thailand
- Province: Bangkok
- Khet: Phra Nakhon
- Named after: Wat Bowonniwet

Population (2017)
  - Total: 4,837
- Time zone: UTC+7 (ICT)
- Postal code: 10200
- TIS 1099: 100107

Bowon Niwet (Thai: บวรนิเวศ, pronounced [bɔ̄ː.wɔ̄ːn ní(ʔ).wêːt]) is a khwaeng (subdistrict) of Phra Nakhon District, in Bangkok, Thailand. In 2017 it had a total population of 4,837 people.

== Name and geography ==
Bowon Niwet is considered to be the central part located on the eastern side of Bangkok's old town zone, known as Rattanakosin Island. Its name comes from Wat Bowonniwet, a prominent local Buddhist temple. The area includes several important landmarks such as Democracy Monument, Wat Ratchanaddaram, Satriwitthaya School, and parts of Bang Lamphu.

=== Neighbourhoods ===
Within Bowon Niwet, there is a small alley called Trok Sake, which connects Tanao Road with Atsadang Road, near the Royal Rattanakosin Hotel and Ratchadamnoen Avenue.

The area lies along Khlong Lot Wat Thep Thidaram, which is part of the old city moat known as Khlong Khu Mueang Doem. It also includes several small streets such as Trok Sathien, Burana Sat Road, Bunsiri Road, and Soi Damnoen Klang Tai.

Trok Sake is considered one of the oldest residential areas on Rattanakosin Island. It houses the residence of Prince Prachak Silapakhom, a son of King Rama IV and the founder of Udon Thani Province, known as Trok Sake Palace. Today, the palace is abandoned and in a severely dilapidated condition. In the past, Trok Sake was also the birthplace and home of Pu Raberd Khuad, a well-known teenage gangster during the 1950s and 1960s. He was portrayed as a villain in the successful 1997 period film Dang Bireley's and Young Gangsters.

Today, Trok Sake is regarded as a haven for low-income individuals and the homeless, making it one of Bangkok's deteriorated areas. Additionally, these lanes are filled with vendors selling mostly second-hand and inexpensive goods.

The area is also known as a source of various types of prostitution, involving individuals ranging from the young to the elderly, both male and female. In recent years, numerous inns and hostels of varying price points have emerged, seemingly catering to this underground trade.
