= Bangkok City Library =

Public library in Bangkok, Thailand

Coordinates: 13.7578°N 100.4987°E

- หอสมุดเมืองกรุงเทพมหานคร
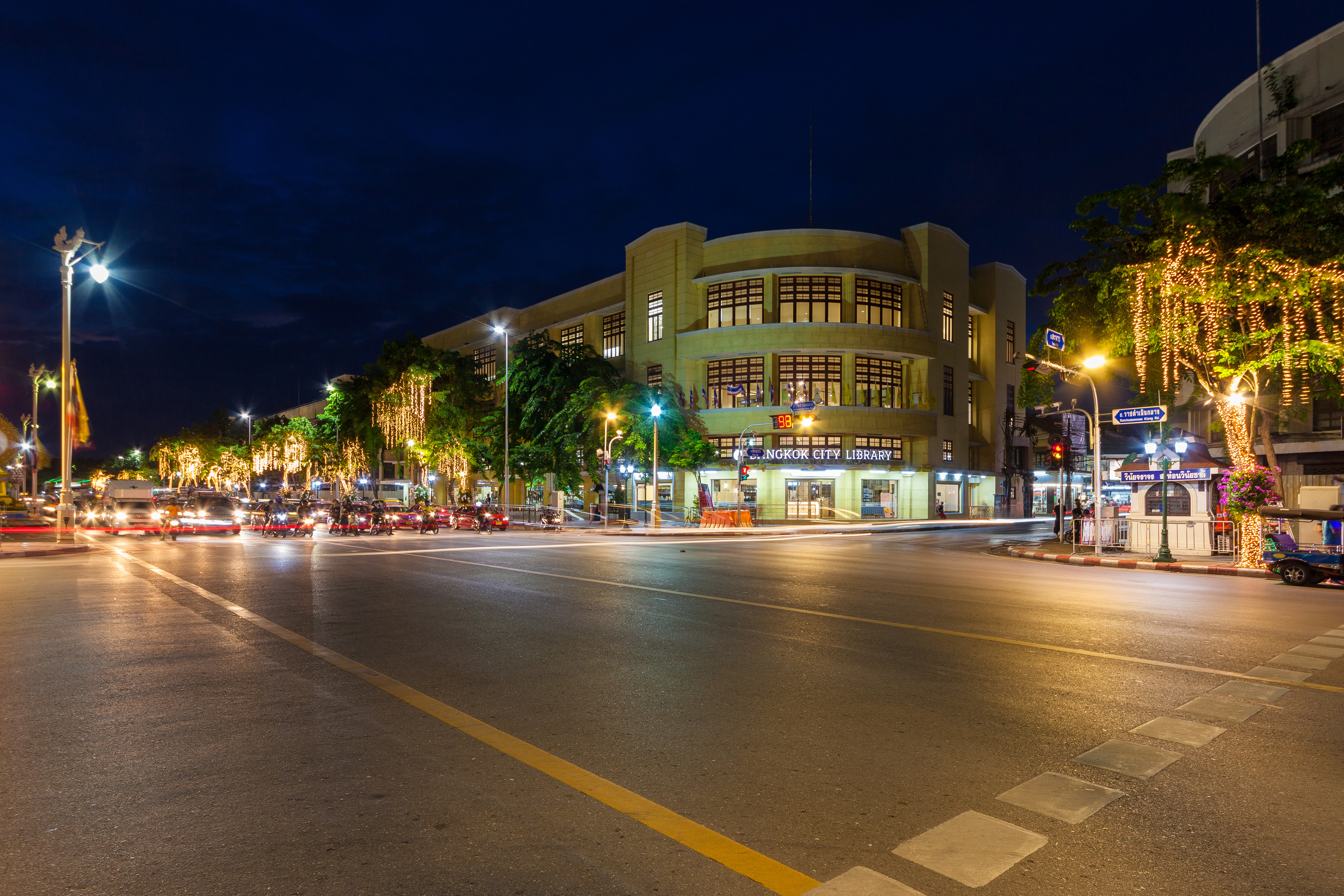

General information
- Location: 39 Ratchadamnoen Klang Rd, Talat Yot, Phra Nakhon, 10200, Bangkok, Thailand
- Year built: 1939-1948

Technical details
- Floor count: 4

The Bangkok City Library is the largest branch of the public library in Bangkok, Thailand. It is located at the historically significant Khok Wua Intersection in the Phra Nakhon District. The building which houses the library was originally completed in 1949. After Bangkok was named the UNESCO World Book Capital in 2013 the building was renovated and opened it's doors as a library in 2017.

The Bangkok City Library occupies 4,789 m^{2} spread over four floors and features a large collection of media in a variety of formats. The first floor houses a collection of books and magazines as well as a reading room, video screening area, computer workspaces, exhibition space, and a tourist information booth. The second floor houses a collection of children's books in both Thai and foreign languages, as well as a children's activity area. The third floor is where the majority of the collection of books is held and includes a collection of Thai Funerary books. The fourth floor features an exhibition on King Rama IX as well as a collection of books that are significant to the history of royalty in Thailand and other books of national interest, as well as an archive. In terms of accessible services, the library also features a collection of both braille and audiobooks.

Thai Citizens can utilize library services by providing an ID card and can receive a library card for a fee. Foreigners can also use the library services by presenting identification such as a passport. Lending books is only available to Thai nationals.

The building was previously a Commerce Ministry Building and the cost of the renovation came in at around 200 million baht. The buiding features an atrium space, with skylights that bring daylight all the way down to the main floor.
