= Trok Mo Market =

Wet market and community in Bangkok

Coordinates: 13°44′59.6″N 100°29′57.3″E

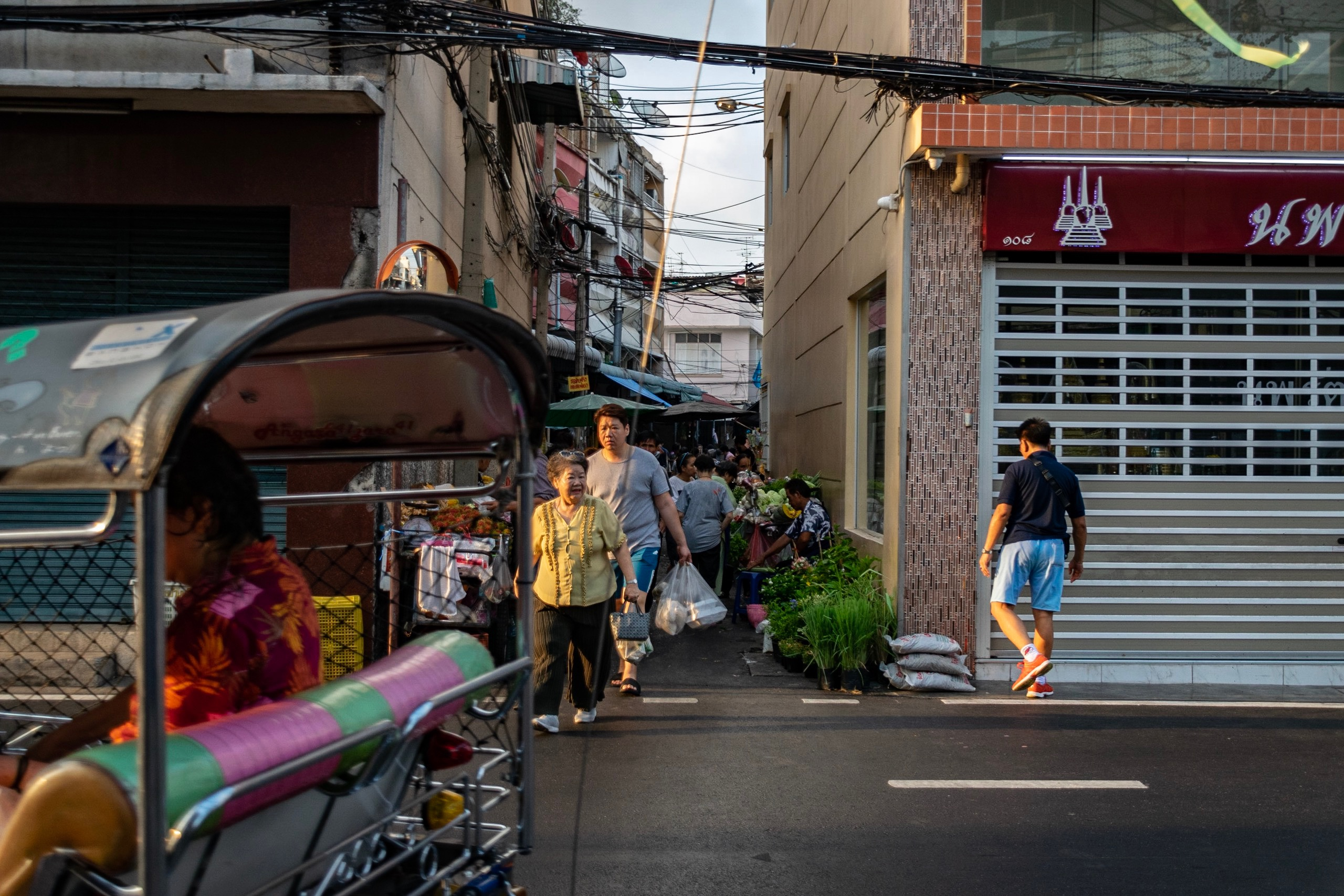
Trok Mor Market entrance

Trok Mo Market (Thai: ตลาดตรอกหม้อ, RTGS: Talat Trok Mo, pronounced [tā.làːt trɔ̀ːk mɔ̂ː]; or spelled Trok Mor), also known as Thesa Market (ตลาดเทศา, RTGS: Talat Thesa, [tā.làːt tʰēː.sǎː]), or officially as Ratchabophit Phatthana Community (ชุมชนราชบพิธพัฒนา), is a wet market and community in Bangkok. It is regarded as one of Bangkok's busiest and oldest with most vibrant markets. Located in the area of Wat Ratchabophit Subdistrict, Phra Nakhon District, or Rattanakosin Island, the Bangkok's old town zone. It is considered one of inner Bangkok's wet markets, in addition to Pak Khlong Talat and Tha Tian Market.

The market site along the lane of Soi Thesa, the side-street branching off Ratchabophit Road beside Wat Ratchabophit and links to Bamrung Mueang Road in the area near Giant Swing and Wat Suthat with Bangkok City Hall.

This market is older than 70 years or more. Its name refers to "pottery lane". Because in the past, about 100 years ago, this area used to be a pottery store before being sold to Ban Mo nearby.

In those days, the market had a wider area than today, which extends to the Giant Swing ground and the current location of Bangkok City Hall. In which it was called "Sao Chingcha [Giant Swing] Market" until the year 1973, vendors therefore moved to sell at the present location. Due to the construction of the Bangkok City Hall to replace.

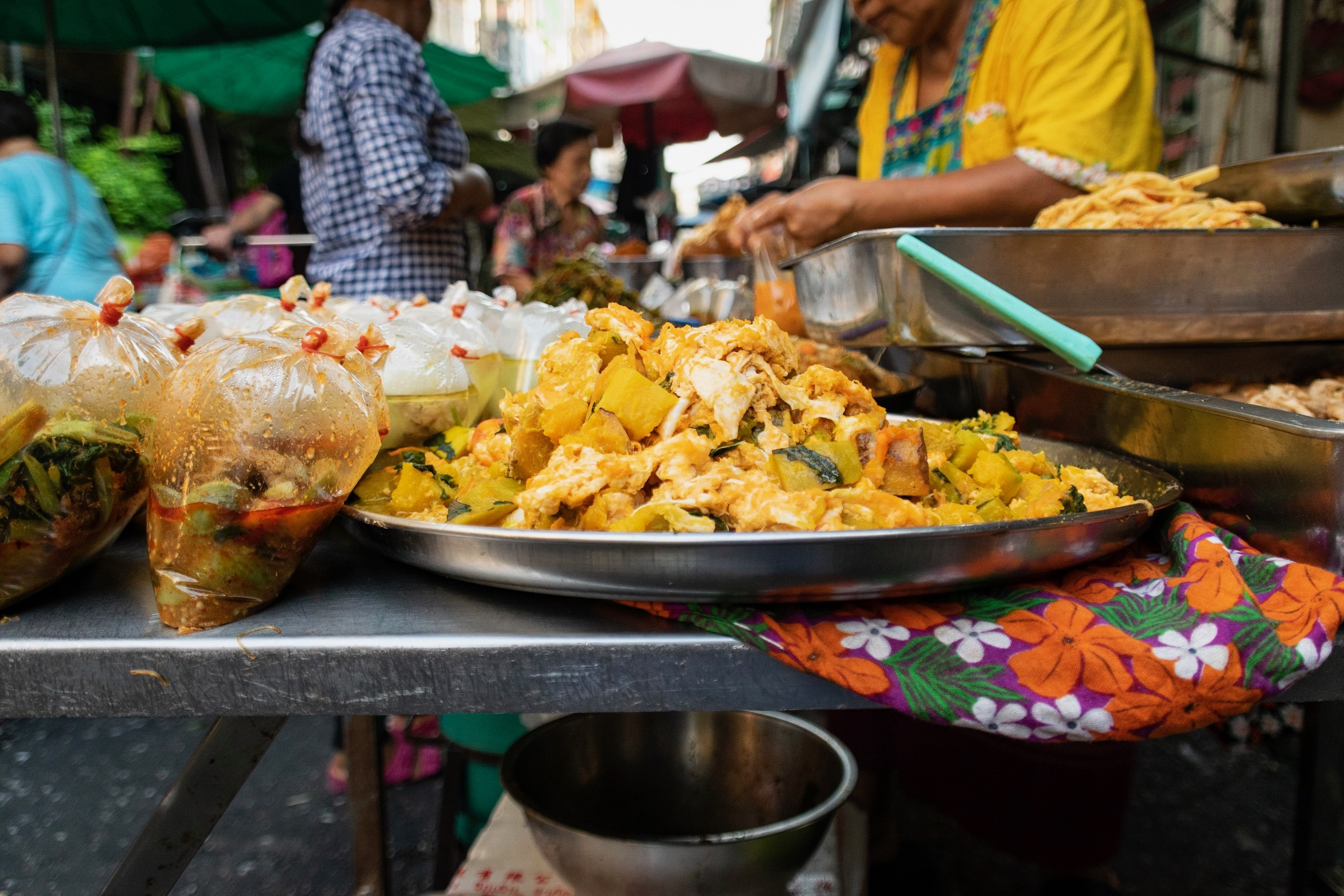
A rice-curry shop (khao kaeng) at Trok Mor Market

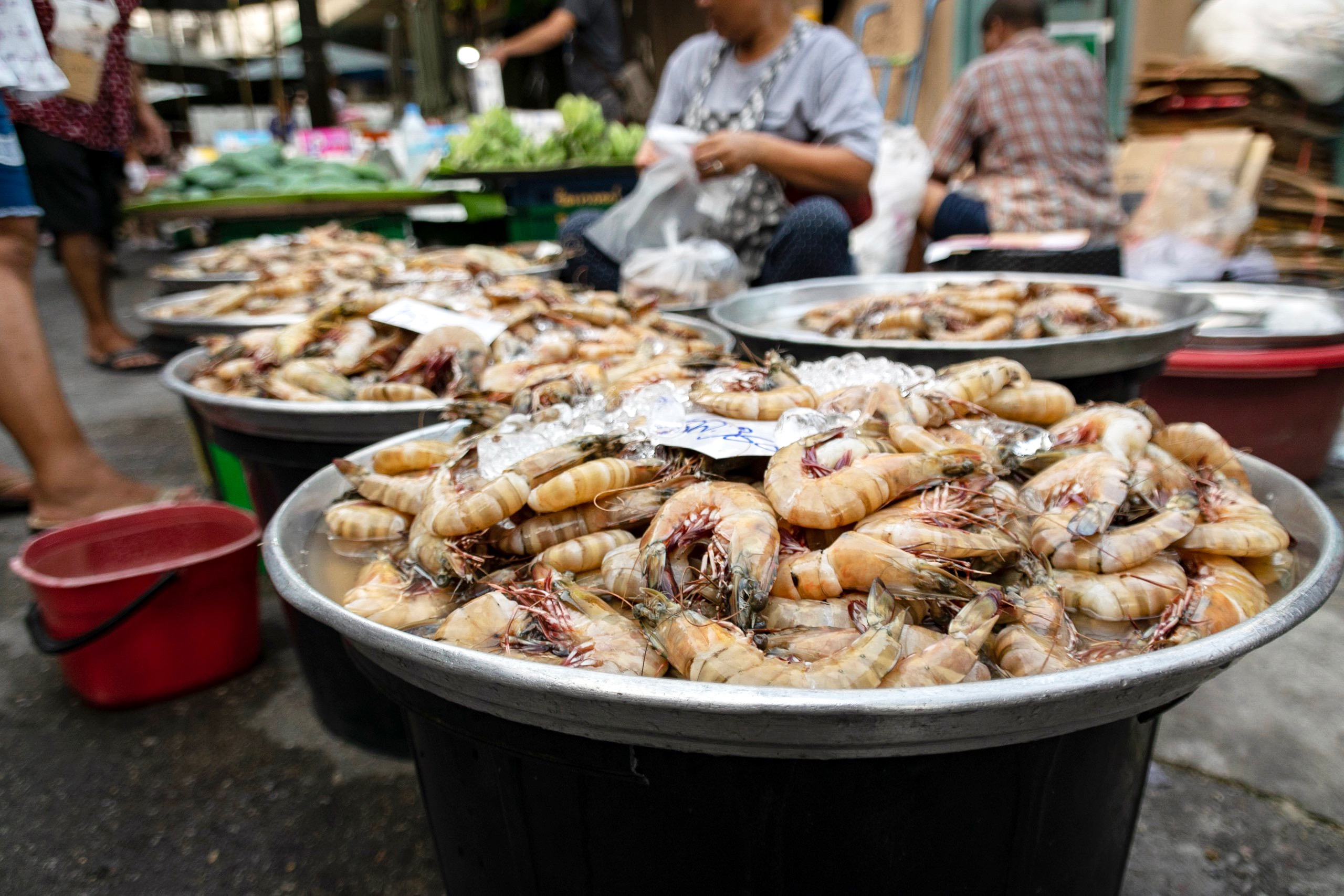
Shrimp vendor at Trok Mor Market

Currently, it is known as a market for various goods, such as seafood, fresh fruits, vegetables, rice and curry, and clothes. In addition, it is also a popular place to make merit by giving food to monks, a daily routine. Besides, the tip of the market at the Bamrung Mueang Road is a center of Buddhist alms shops as well. They are all shophouses built in Sino-Portuguese architecture and most are run by Thai Chinese.

Trok Mo Market is a morning market, open from 05.00 am to about 11.00 am only.
