= Wat Mahannapharam =

Buddhist temple in Bangkok, Thailand

Coordinates: 13.754736°N 100.499328°E

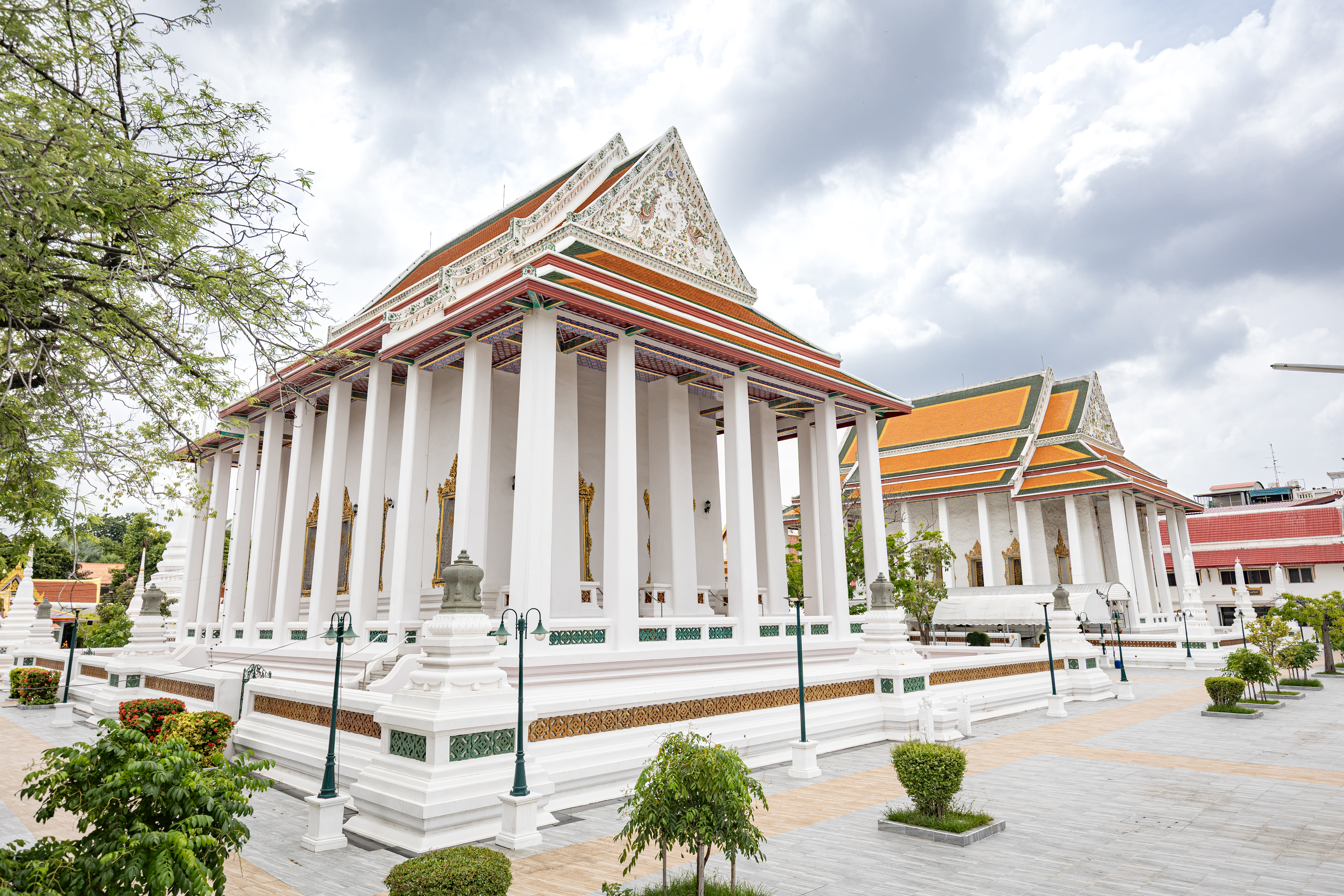
Ubosot And Vihara of Wat Mahanop

Wat Mahannapharam Worawihan or Wat Mahan, commonly called Wat Mahanop (Thai: วัดมหรรณพ), is a Buddhist temple in Bangkok, Thailand. The first state school for general public in Thailand was established at the temple in 1884.

== History ==
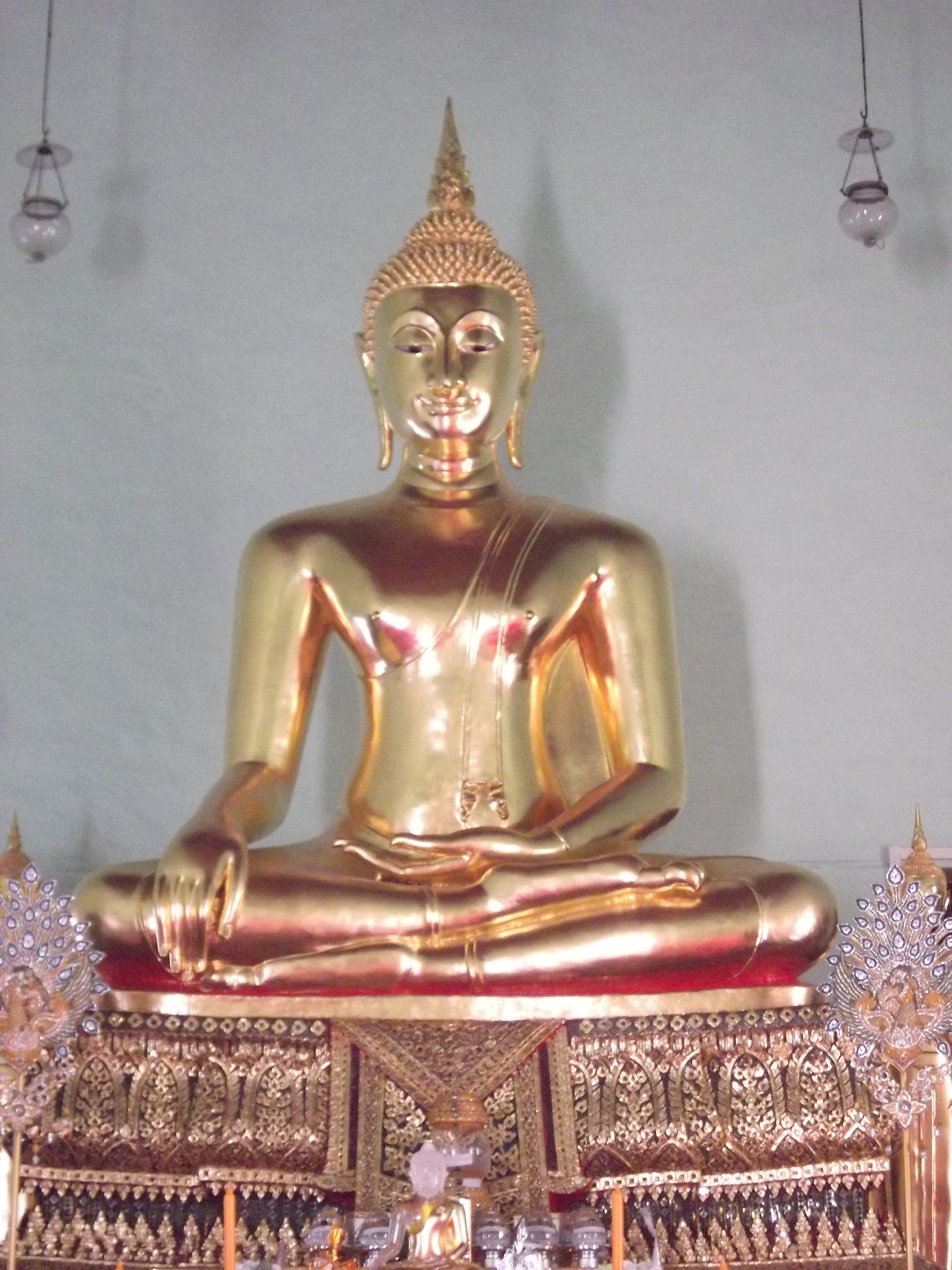
Luang Por Bunyarit

Wat Mahannapharam Worawihan was constructed in the reign of King Rama III (1824–1851) by Prince Annop, a son of Rama III. The construction began in 1850 with the king providing 80,000 baht. However it was only completed in the reign of King Rama IV (1851–1868) when the new king provided another 80,000 baht. The name of the temple means "the great abode of water", referring to the Sea of Samsara, the endless cycle of birth, death and rebirth.

The first public school in Thailand was established at Wat Mahannapharam by the abbot of the temple after an instruction was issued by Rama V encouraging temples to set up new schools for common people in 1884. It was the beginning of mass education in Thailand. A statue of Rama V was later erected at the wat to mark the centenary of the founding of the school.

The temple and items within have been placed in the national register of historic items and places since 1949.

== Buddha images ==
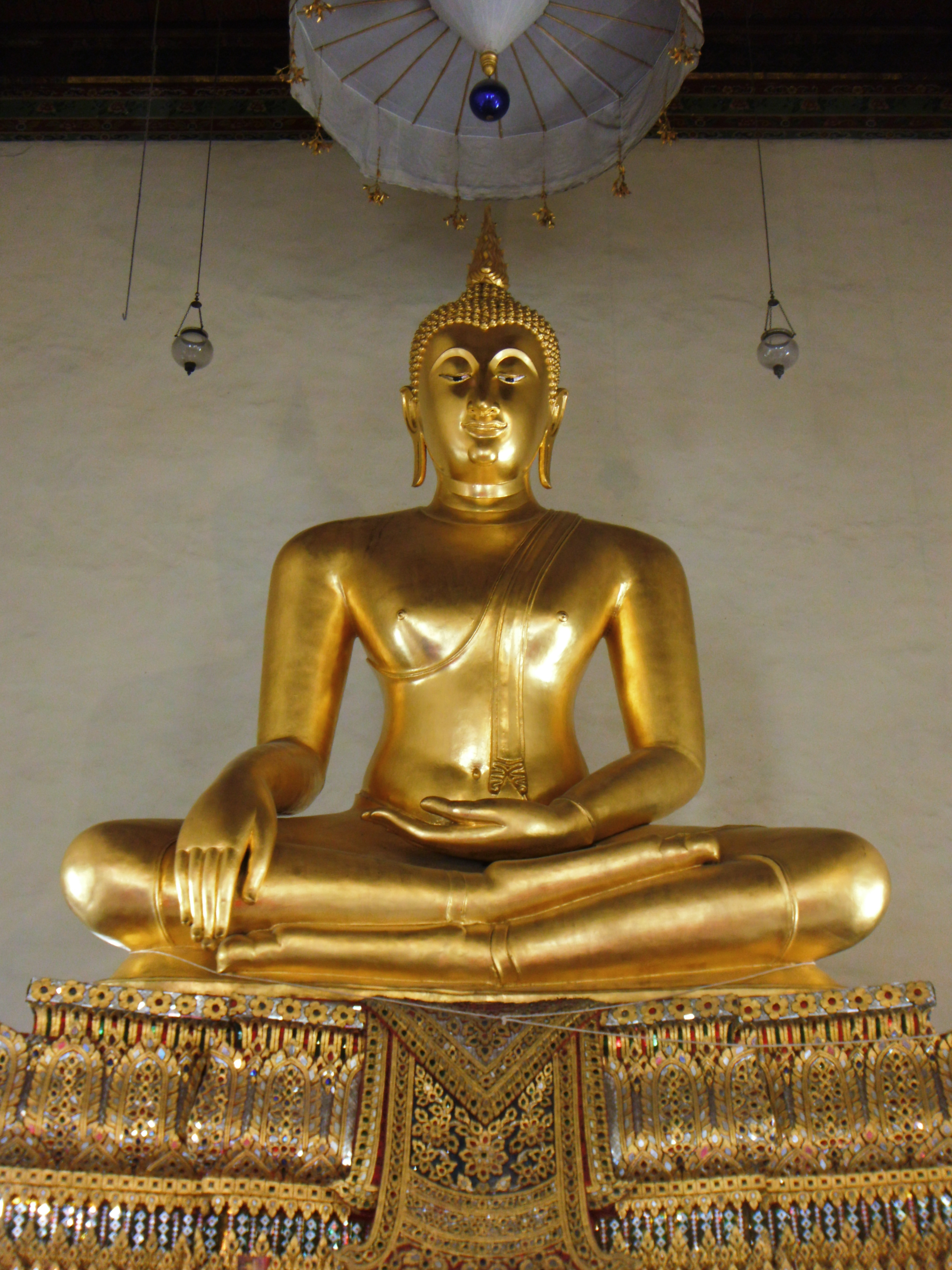
Pra Ruang Thong Kam

The main Buddha image in the ubosot is Luang Por Bunyarit (หลวงพ่อบุญฤทธิ์), sculpted during the reign of Rama III in Ayutthaya style. The Buddha image in the wihan is Pra Ruang Thong Kam (พระร่วงทองคำ), cast in Sukhothai style. Pra Ruang is much older, dated back to Sukhothai period and made from 60 per cent gold.

== Takraw ==
An unusual tradition in this temple is that devotees can donate rattan takraw balls, and children are allowed to play takraw within the temple compound.
