= Bamrung Mueang Road =

Street in Bangkok, Thailand

Coordinates: 13°45′07″N 100°30′30″E

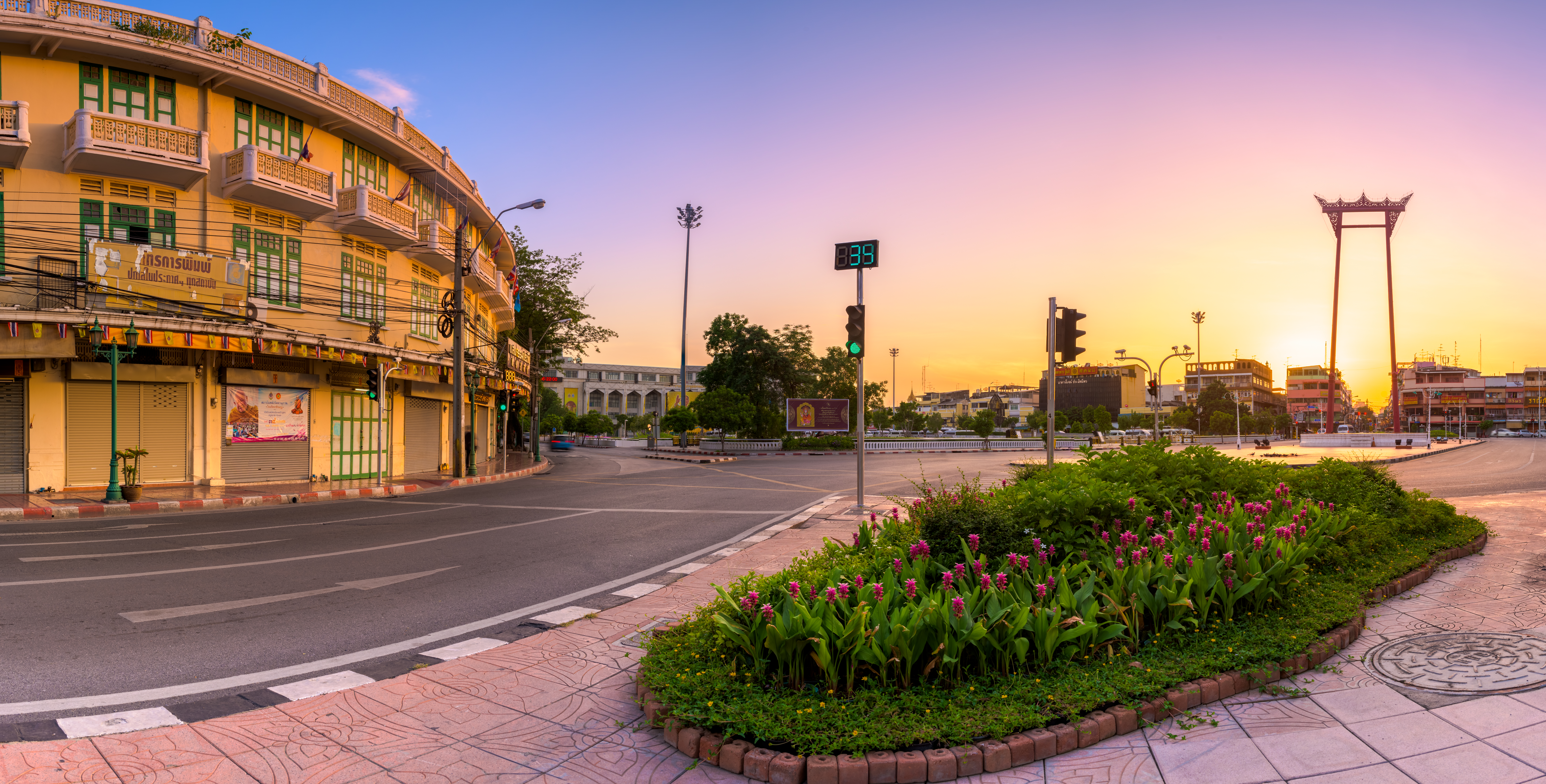
Shophouses near the Giant Swing, on the corner of Bamrung Mueang Road

Bamrung Mueang Road (Thai: ถนนบำรุงเมือง, pronounced [tʰā.nǒn bām.rūŋ mɯ̄a̯ŋ]) is the second paved road in Bangkok. It was built in 1863 after Charoen Krung Road, in the reign of King Mongkut (Rama IV). It cut through the old fortified city of Rattanakosin Island from west to east, beginning near the Grand Palace, passing the Giant Swing and running eastward to Khlong Phadung Krung Kasem. It continues on as Rama I Road after crossing Kasat Suek Bridge. It was the main thoroughfare as the city expanded eastward and away from the Chao Phraya river in the early 20th century.

Originally, it was called unofficially "Thanon Ree" (ถนนรี lit. 'diagonal road') or "Thanon Sao Chingcha" (ถนนเสาชิงช้า lit. 'giant swing road'). In the reign of King Chulalongkorn (Rama V), the road was made 9 meters (29.5 feet) wide as seen today. In the early Rattanakosin period (reigns of King Buddha Yodfa (Rama I) to King Nangklao (Rama III)), it was only an earthen path extending from the Grand Palace.

The road's early segment is lined by historic shophouse buildings, originally built with connecting colonnades forming a five-foot way (a feature commonly found in Malaysia and Singapore), which, however, have since been walled up, and as such this segment of the road lacks pedestrian walkways.

These shophouses owned by Thai Chinese people who do Buddhist monk's items business.
