= Charoen Sri 34 Bridge =

Charoen Sri 34 Bridge สะพานเจริญศรี ๓๔
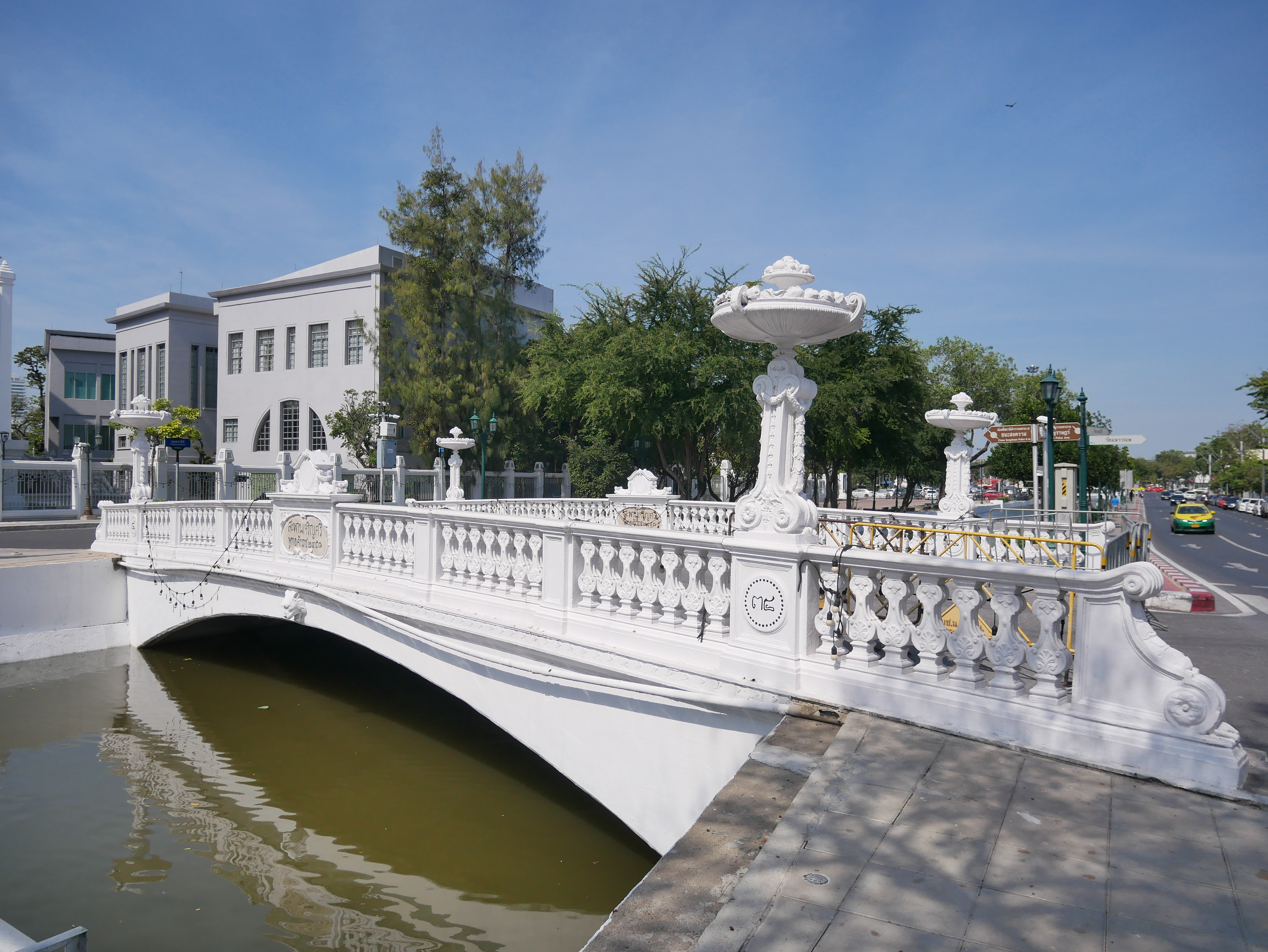
- Coordinates: 13°45′17.2″N 100°29′44.2″E
- Carries: Bunsiri Road
- Crosses: Khlong Khu Mueang Doem
- Locale: Phra Borom Maha Ratchawang & San Chaopho Suea sub-districts, Phra Nakhon district, Bangkok
- Official name: Charoen Sri 34 Bridge
- Maintained by: Bangkok Metropolitan Administration (BMA)

History
- Opened: 30 December 1914

Charoen Sri 34 Bridge (Thai: สะพานเจริญศรี ๓๔, pronounced [sā.pʰāːn t͡ɕā.rɤ̄ːnsǐː sǎːm sìpsìː]) is a historic bridge in the Rattanakosin Island or Bangkok's old town zone.

It was built in 1913, financed from King Rama VI's private fund, to celebrate his 34th birthday. The bridge has four plaster posts decorated with western style stucco.

The Thai number ๔ on each post signifies the fourth year in the King Rama VI's reign.

Charoen Sri 34 is a bridge across Khlong Khu Mueang Doem (old city moat), the moat surrounding the Grand Palace excavated since the King Rama I's reign. It is a bridge leading to the Supreme Court.

== Other bridges over Khlong Khu Mueang Doem ==
- Phan Phiphop Lila Bridge
- Chang Rong Si Bridge
- Pi Kun Bridge
- Saphan Hok
- Mon Bridge
- Ubonrat Bridge
- Charoenrat 31 Bridge
