= Ubonrat Bridge =

Ubonrat Bridge สะพานอุบลรัตน์
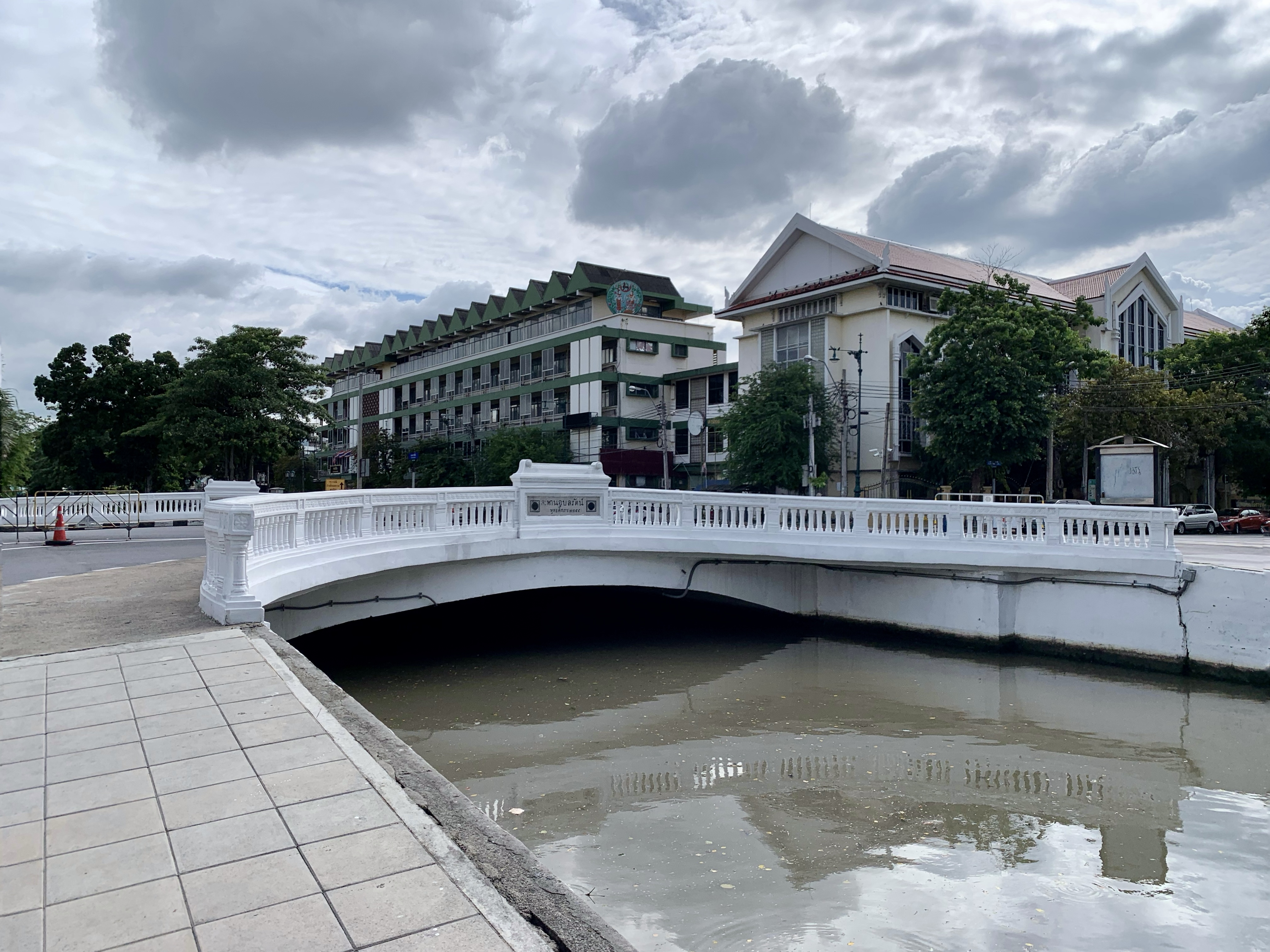
- Coordinates: 13°44′43.51″N 100°29′46.63″E
- Crosses: Khlong Khu Mueang Doem
- Locale: Phra Borom Maha Ratchawang & Wang Burapha Phirom sub-districts, Phra Nakhon district, Bangkok
- Official name: Ubonrat Bridge
- Other name(s): Ubolratana Bridge
- Maintained by: Bangkok Metropolitan Administration (BMA)

History
- Opened: 27 April 1913

Ubonrat Bridge, sometimes written as Ubolratana Bridge (Thai: สะพานอุบลรัตน์, pronounced [sā.pʰāːn ʔùʔ.bōn.rát]) is a historic bridge spanning Khlong Khu Mueang Doem (old city moat) in Rattanakosin Island or Bangkok's old town zone.

== Background ==
The bridge was built in 1912 as a memorial to Princess Ubolratana Narinaga, the consort of King Chulalongkorn (Rama V). It was built on a former bridge called "Hua Takae" (หัวตะเข้, pronounced [hǔa̯ tā.kʰêː]), which means "the head of a crocodile".

The plaster banisters were designed in the Thai style with the name plate of the bridge set at the middle. It is now a recognised ancient monument since 1988 by the Fine Arts Department.

It connects two roads running along Khlong Khu Mueang Doem: Atsadang and Rachini Roads. At either end of the bridge are two short roads named Phra Phiphit (west) and Phra Phithak (east), both named after sons of King Phutthaloetla Naphalai (Rama II), who once had residences in the area during the early Rattanakosin period. This bridge, like nearby ones such as Mon Bridge, Saphan Hok, and Pi Kun Bridge, spans Khlong Khu Mueang Doem.
