= Atsadang Road =

Road in Bangkok, Thailand

Coordinates: 13°44′58.89″N 100°29′46.4″E

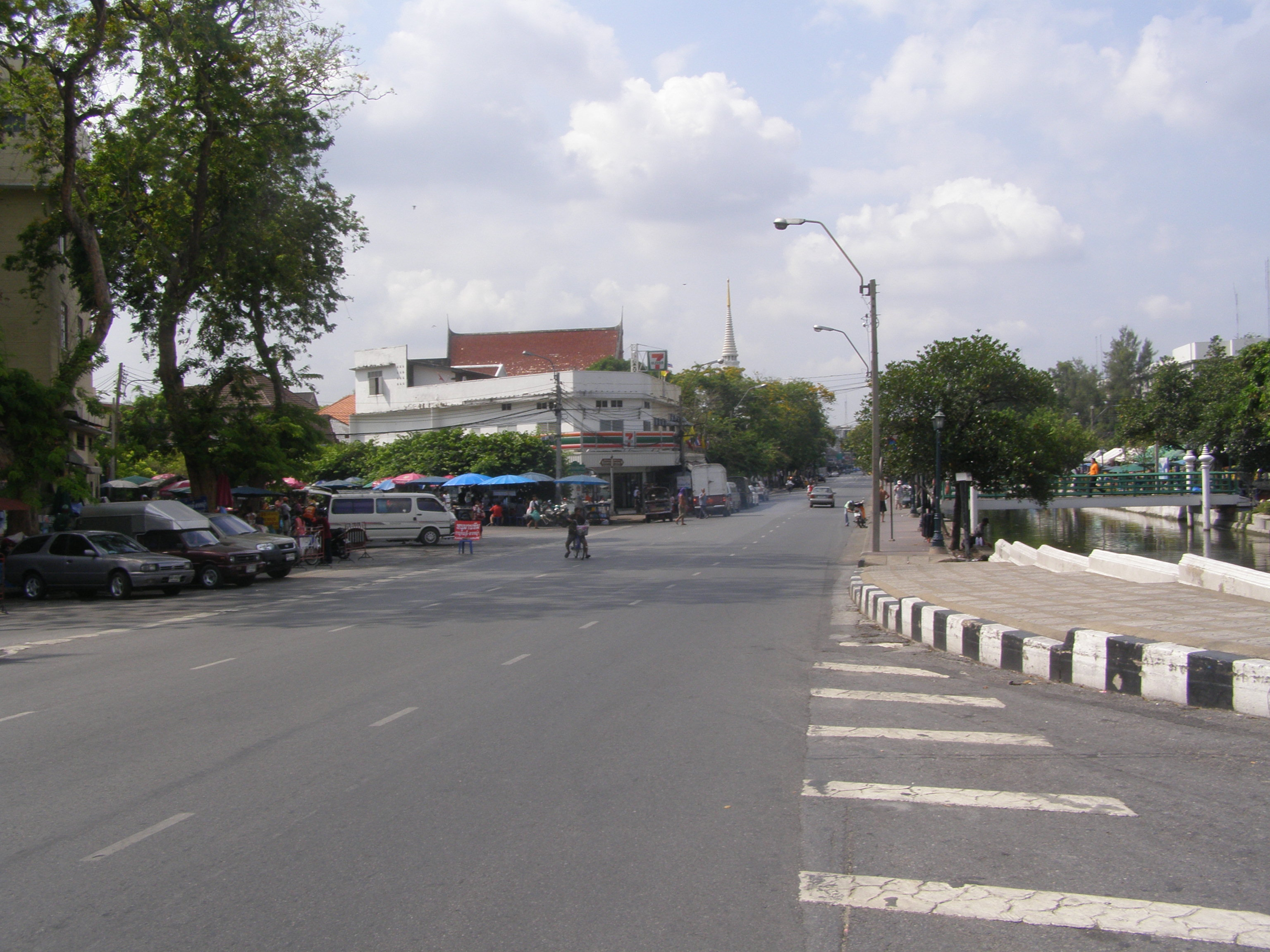
The road begins beside the Royal Rattanakosin Hotel and Sanam Luang, with Khlong Khu Mueang Doem, popularly known as Khlong Lot, running parallel along its entire length

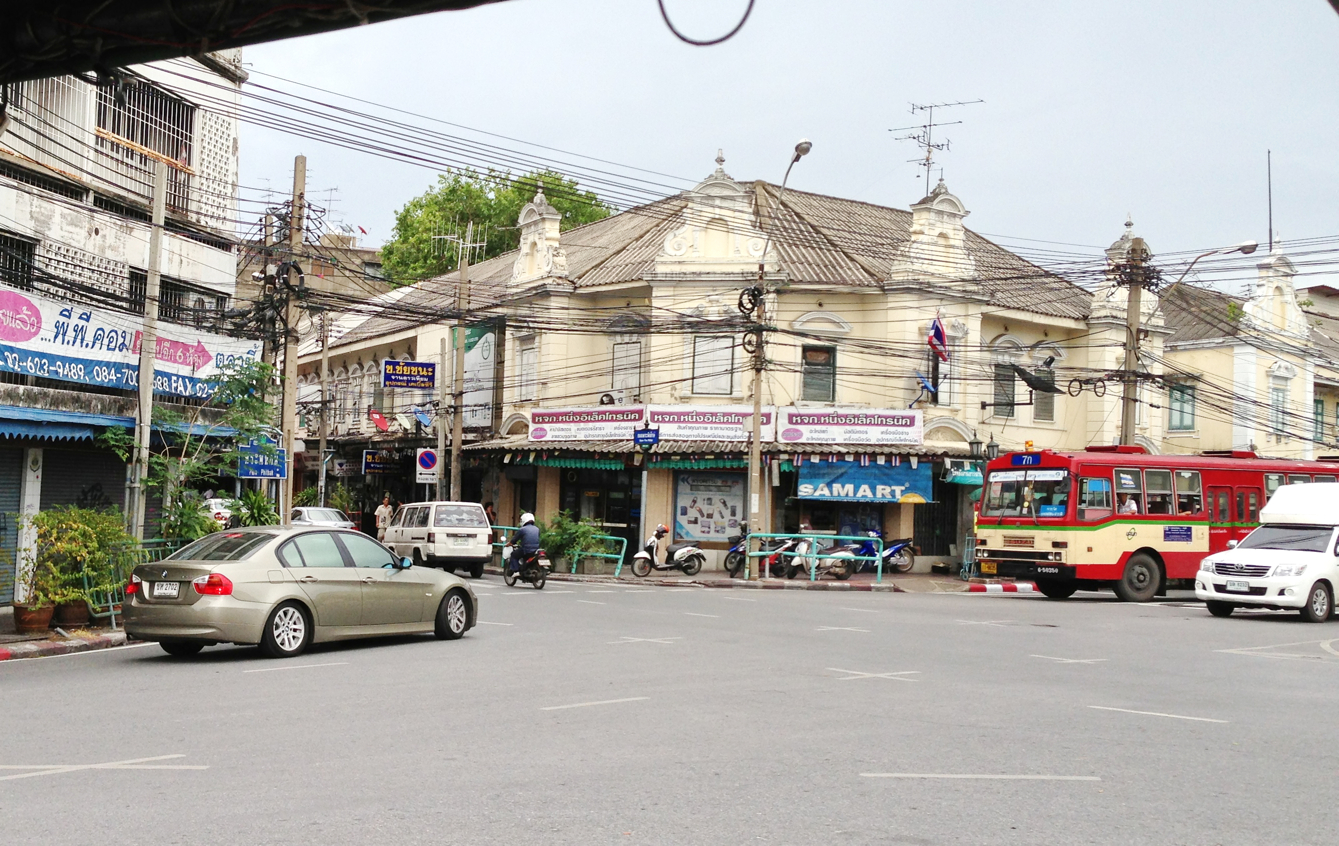
Phra Phithak Intersection, where Atsadang Road passes by a row of old shophouses (viewed from Atsadang Road)

Atsadang Road (Thai: ถนนอัษฎางค์, RTGS: Thanon Atsadang, pronounced [tʰā.nǒn ʔàt.sā.dāːŋ]) is a historic road located in inner Bangkok on Rattanakosin Island. It overlaps four subdistricts of Phra Nakhon District: Bowon Niwet, San Chaopho Suea, Wat Ratchabophit, and Wang Burapha Phirom.

The road begins at Ratchadamnoen Avenue, near Sanam Luang and the Phan Phiphop Lila Bridge, and runs southward until it reaches the junction with Chakkraphet Road and Charoenrat 31 Bridge in the Pak Khlong Talat area, behind the Ban Mo neighbourhood and close to the Chao Phraya River. Throughout its 1.6 km (1.0 mi) length, Atsadang Road runs parallel to Khlong Khu Mueang Doem (the old city moat) and Rachini Road.

The road was named in honour of Prince Asdang Dejavudh, a son of King Chulalongkorn (Rama V) and Queen Saovabha Phongsri, and a younger brother of King Vajiravudh (Rama VI).

Along its route, Atsadang Road passes many notable landmarks and historic sites, including Wat Buranasirimattayaram, Charoen Sri 34 Bridge, the Sam Phraeng neighbourhood, Chang Rong Si Bridge, the Royal Cemetery at Wat Ratchabophit, the Ministry of Interior, the Pig Memorial and Pi Kun Bridge, Saphan Hok, Saphan Mon, and Ban Mo Palace.

The shophouses lining the road between Ban Mo and Pak Khlong Talat feature beautiful and historic Sino-Portuguese architecture from the reign of King Chulalongkorn. These buildings have been registered as ancient monuments of Bangkok.

The northern end of the road near Sanam Luang is commonly known as "Lang Krasuang" (หลังกระทรวง, lit. 'behind the ministry', referring to the Ministry of Defence). This area is a well-known center for shops specializing in government uniforms, musical instruments, audio and electronic equipment, as well as outdoor and hiking gear.

Historically, the Samsen–Atsadang Line of the Bangkok tram system also ran along Atsadang Road until it was discontinued in 1968.
