= Chang Rong Si Bridge =

Chang Rong Si Bridge สะพานช้างโรงสี
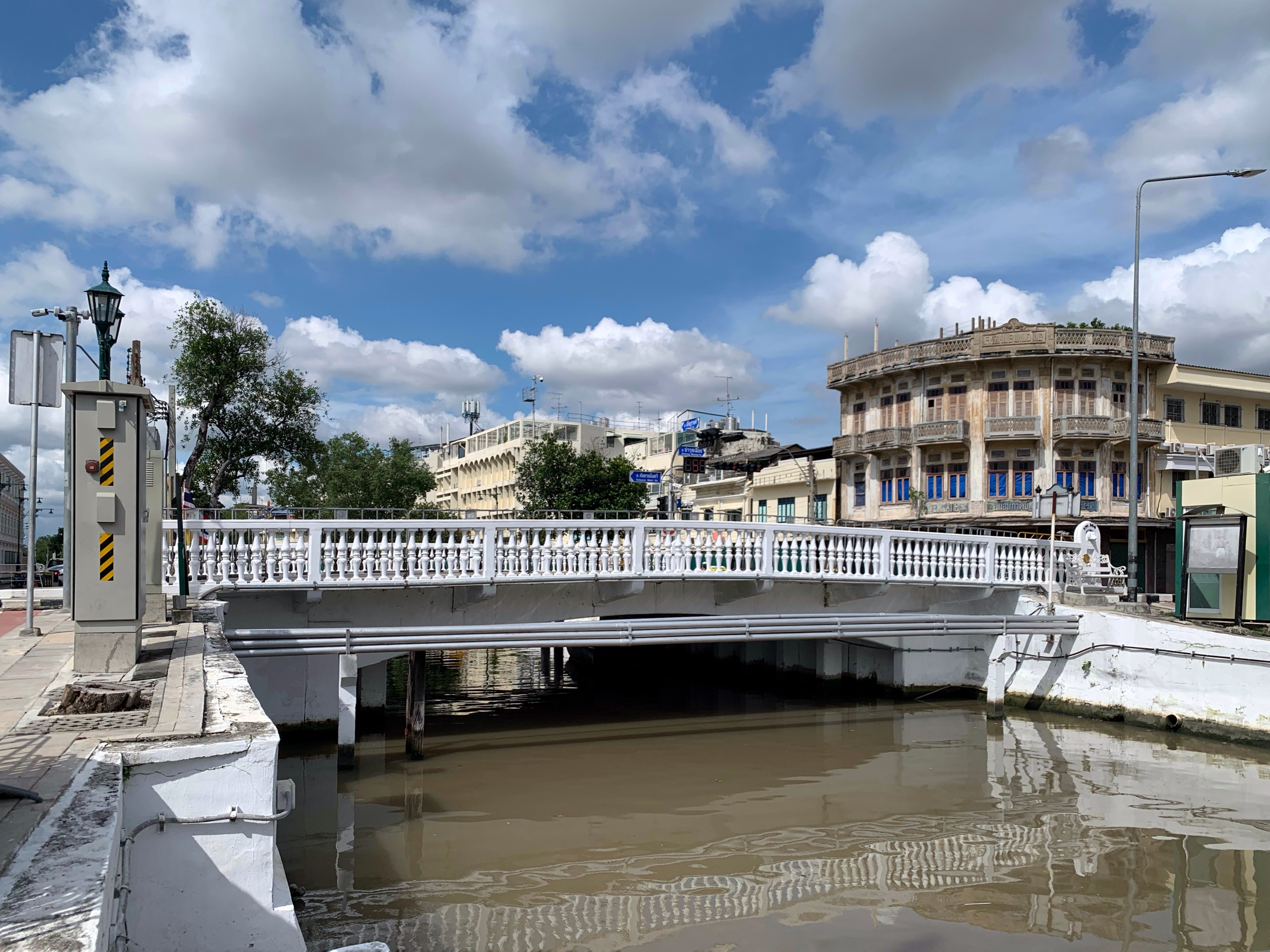
- Saphan Chang Rong Si, taken from the side of Saranrom Palace, overseeing the Fazal Building
- Coordinates: 13°45′04.54″N 100°29′47.03″E
- Carries: Bamrung Mueang Road
- Crosses: Khlong Khu Mueang Doem (Khlong Lot)
- Locale: Phra Nakhon District, Bangkok, Thailand
- Official name: Chang Rong Si Bridge
- Other name(s): Saphan Chang Rong Si; Saphan Chang (Elephant Bridge)
- Maintained by: Bangkok Metropolitan Administration (BMA)

Chang Rong Si Bridge (Thai: สะพานช้างโรงสี, RTGS: Saphan Chang Rong Si, pronounced [sā.pʰāːn t͡ɕʰáːŋ rōːŋ sǐː]) is a bridge and monument in the Rattanakosin Island area at a tripoint between Phra Borom Maha Ratchawang and San Chaopho Suea with Wat Ratchabophit Subdistricts of Phra Nakhon District, the historic centre of Bangkok. The bridge spans Khlong Khu Mueang Doem, the old city moat, and is locate behind the Ministry of Defense and at the front corner of the Ministry of Interior. It signifies the beginning of Bamrung Mueang Road as it continues eastward from Kanlayana Maitri Road. Atsadang Road meets the bridge's eastern foot at the eponymous Saphan Chang Rong Si Intersection, while Rachini Road runs alongside the canal on the opposite side.

The bridge was originally built for elephants that returned from war and was located near a rice mill, hence came the name "Saphan Chang Rong Si", which literally means "elephants' bridge at rice mill". It was originally a wooden bridge and there were three similar bridges which were later demolished.

During the reign of King Chulalongkorn (Rama V), the bridge was restored by Prince Damrong Rajanubhab, the chancellor of the interior, in 1910. The end pieces feature sculptures of dogs' heads that symbolise the year of the dog in the Chinese zodiac, which also corresponds to the prince's birth year.

Chang Rong Si was listed as a registered ancient monument of Bangkok in 1988.

At the foot of the bridge and at the northeast corner of the intersection is the Fazal Building. The striking historic building was built in 1931. Originally, it was a Muslim merchant's department store named "E. M. Katib" selling European glassware, perfume, and crockery.

== Gallery ==
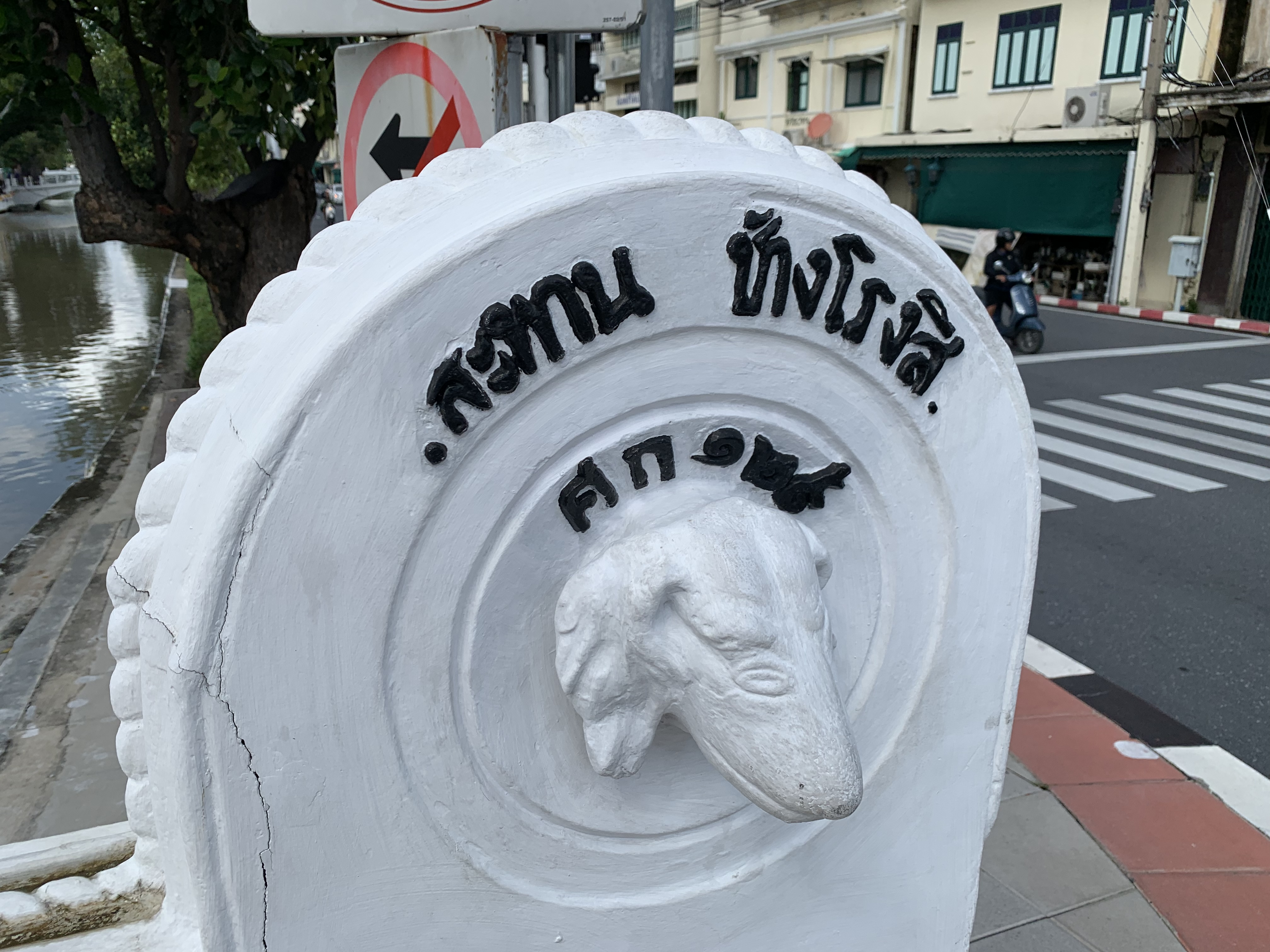
The Dog Head sculpture of the bridge

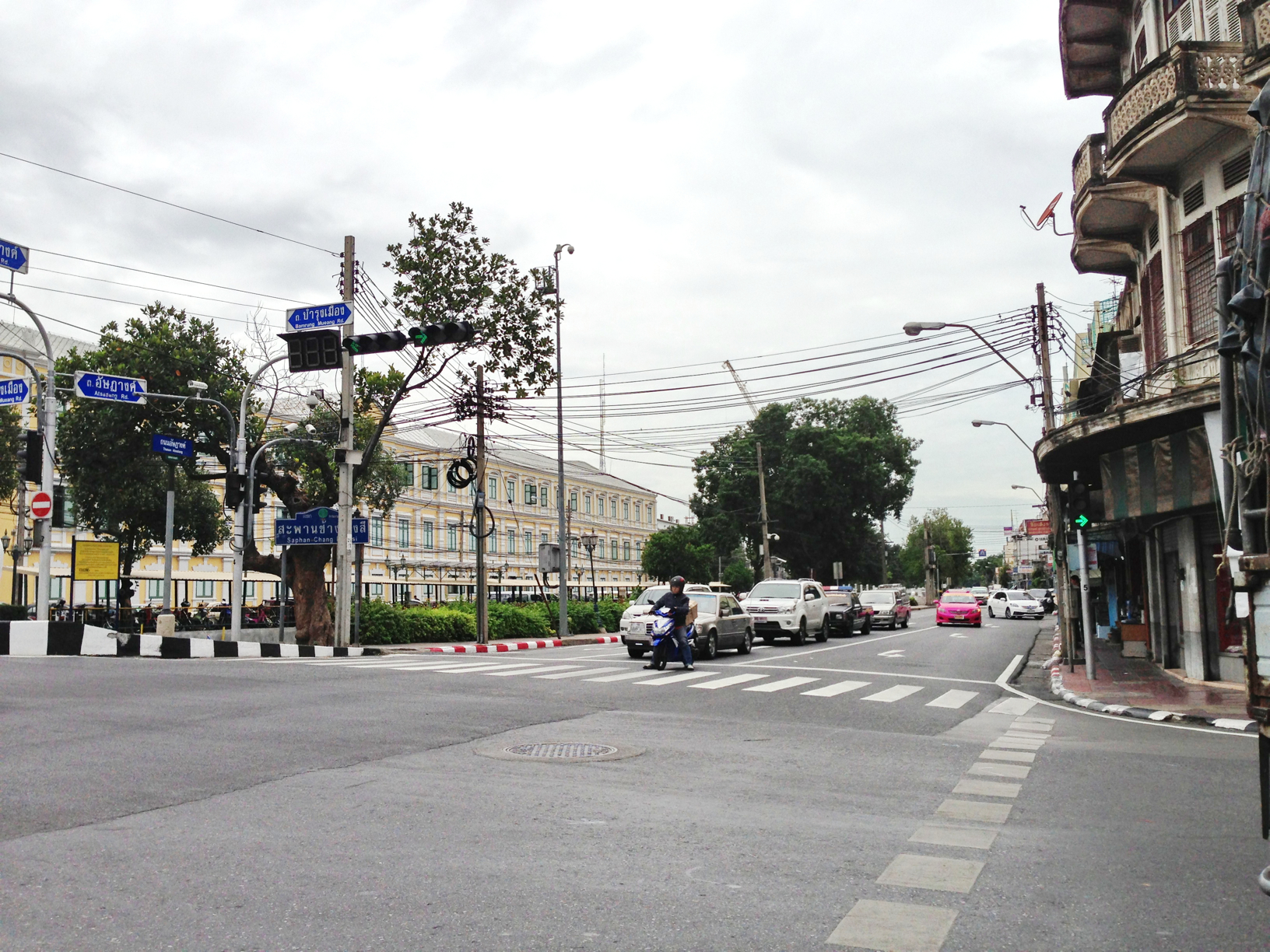
Namesake intersection at the end of the bridge

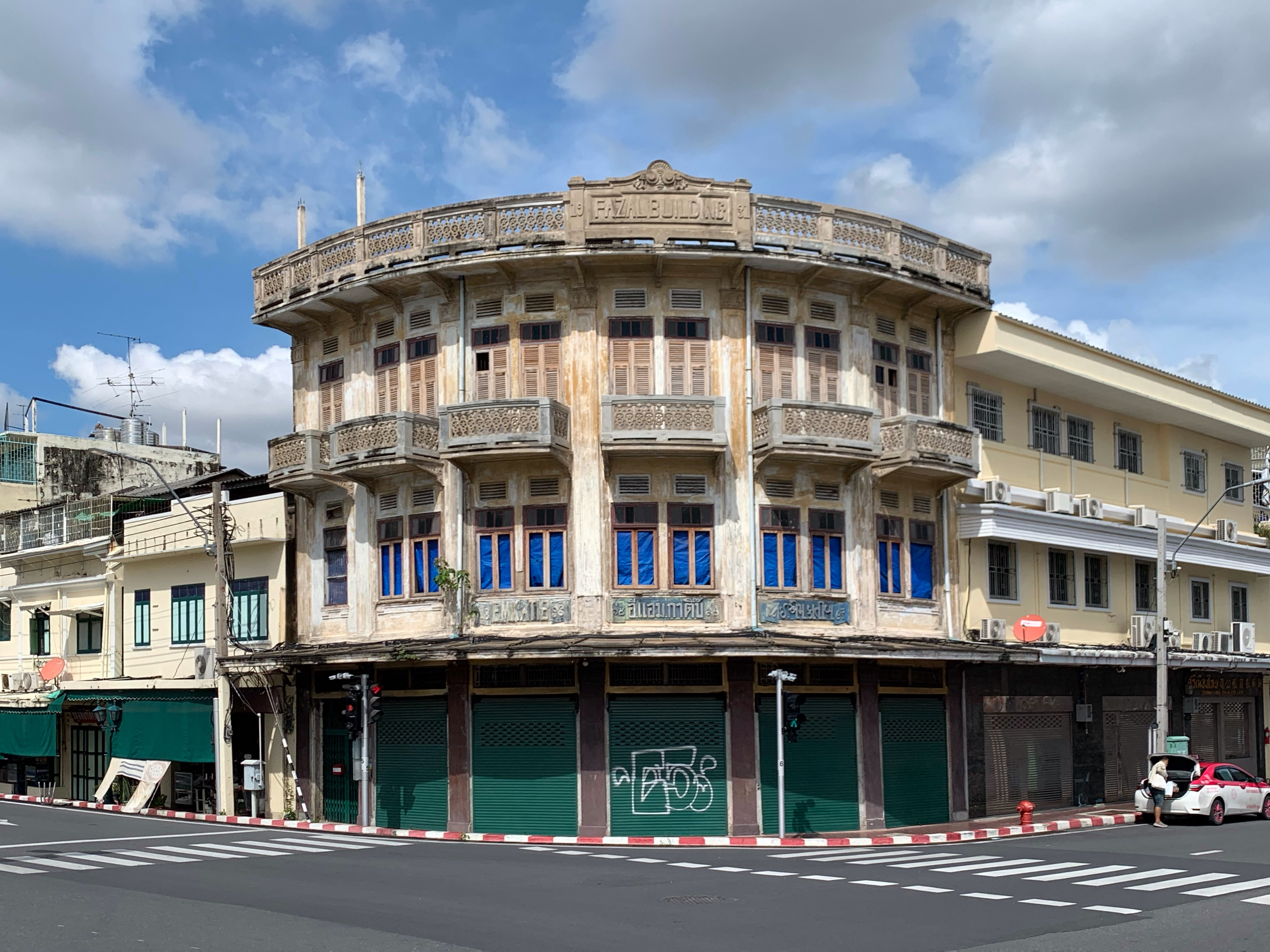
Fazal Building, a historical building at the end of the bridge

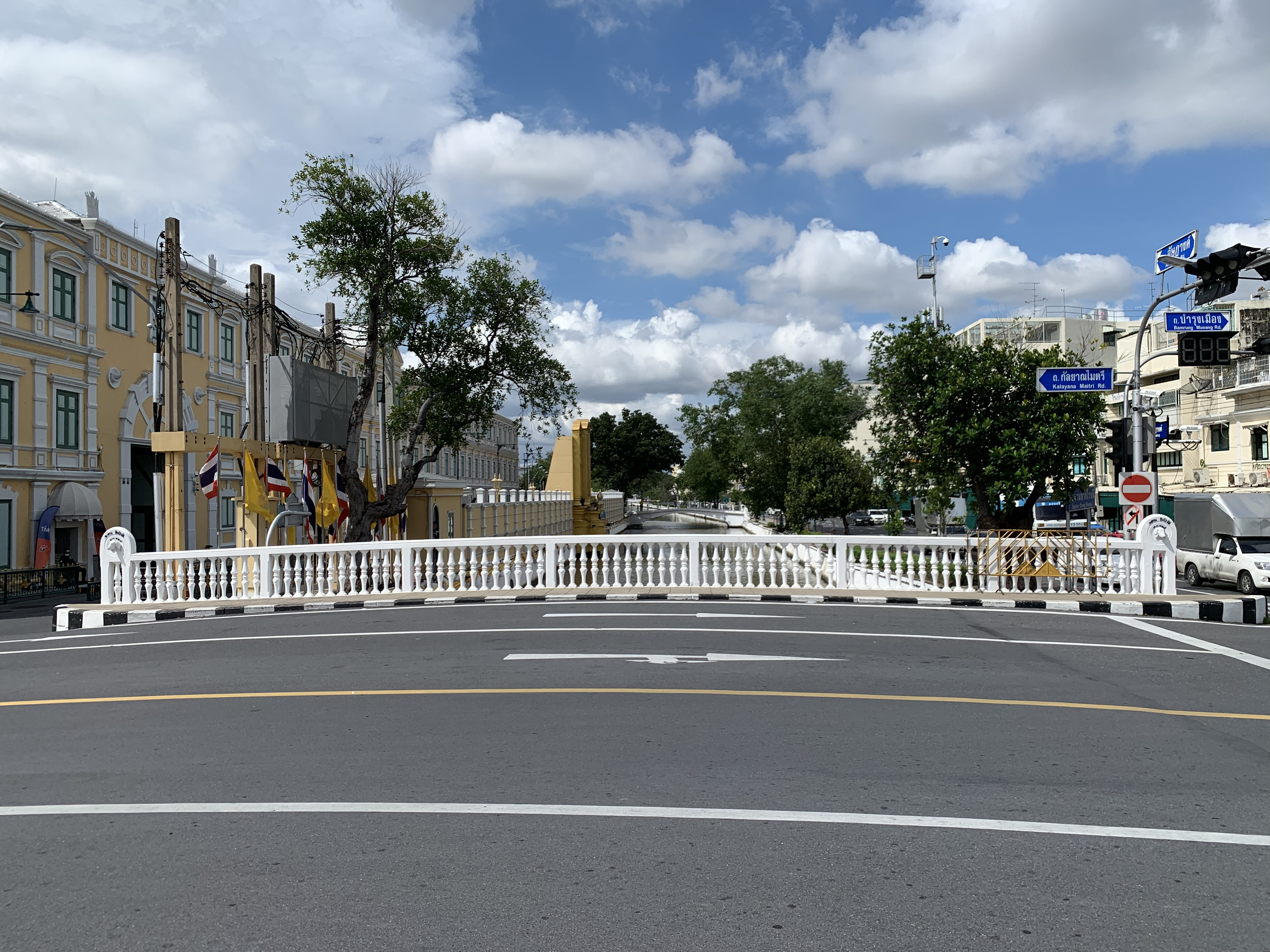
View on the bridge towards the Ministry of Defence

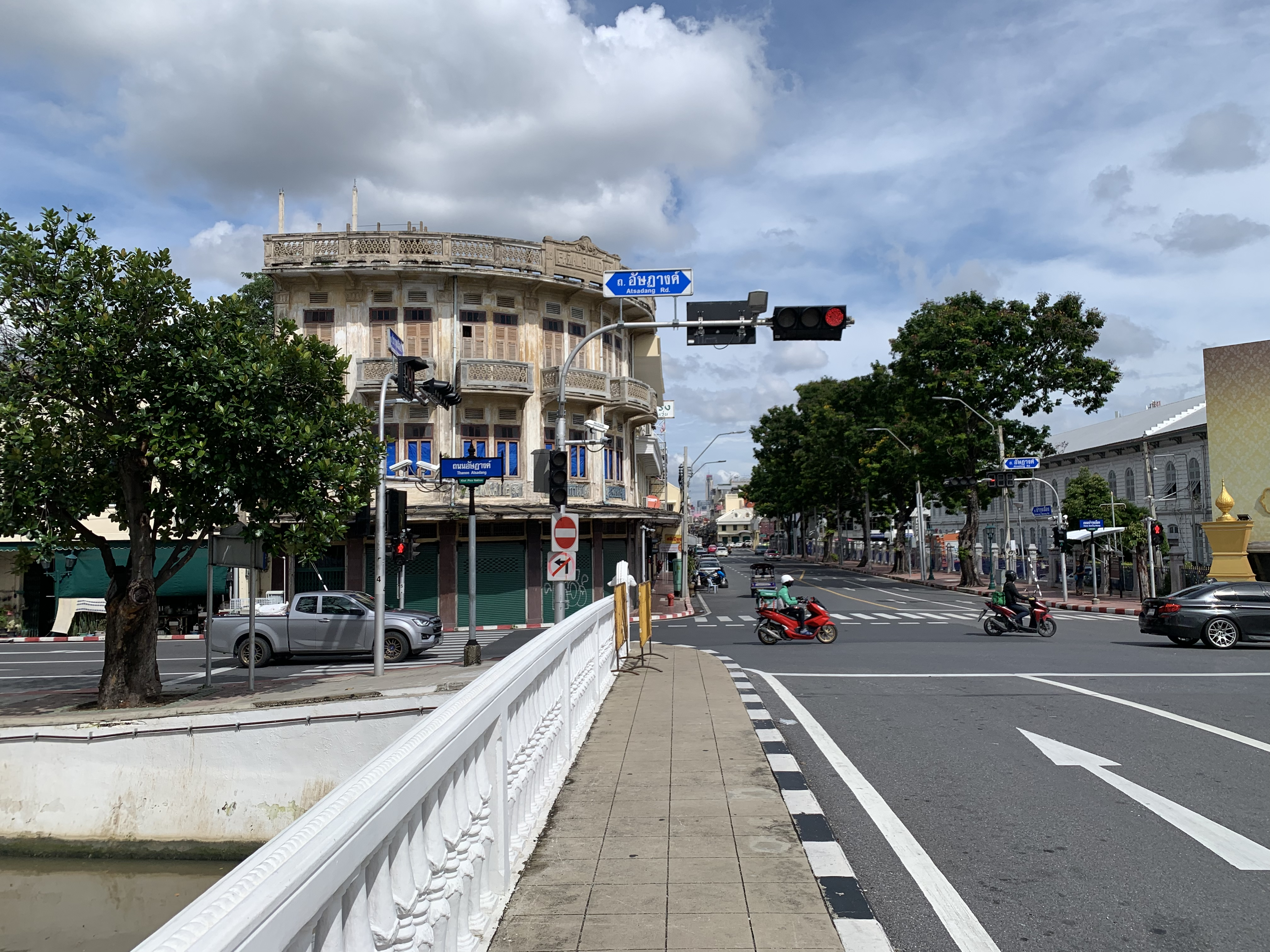
View from the bridge towards Bamrung Mueang Road and Fazal Building
