= Kanlayana Maitri Road =

Street in Bangkok, Thailand

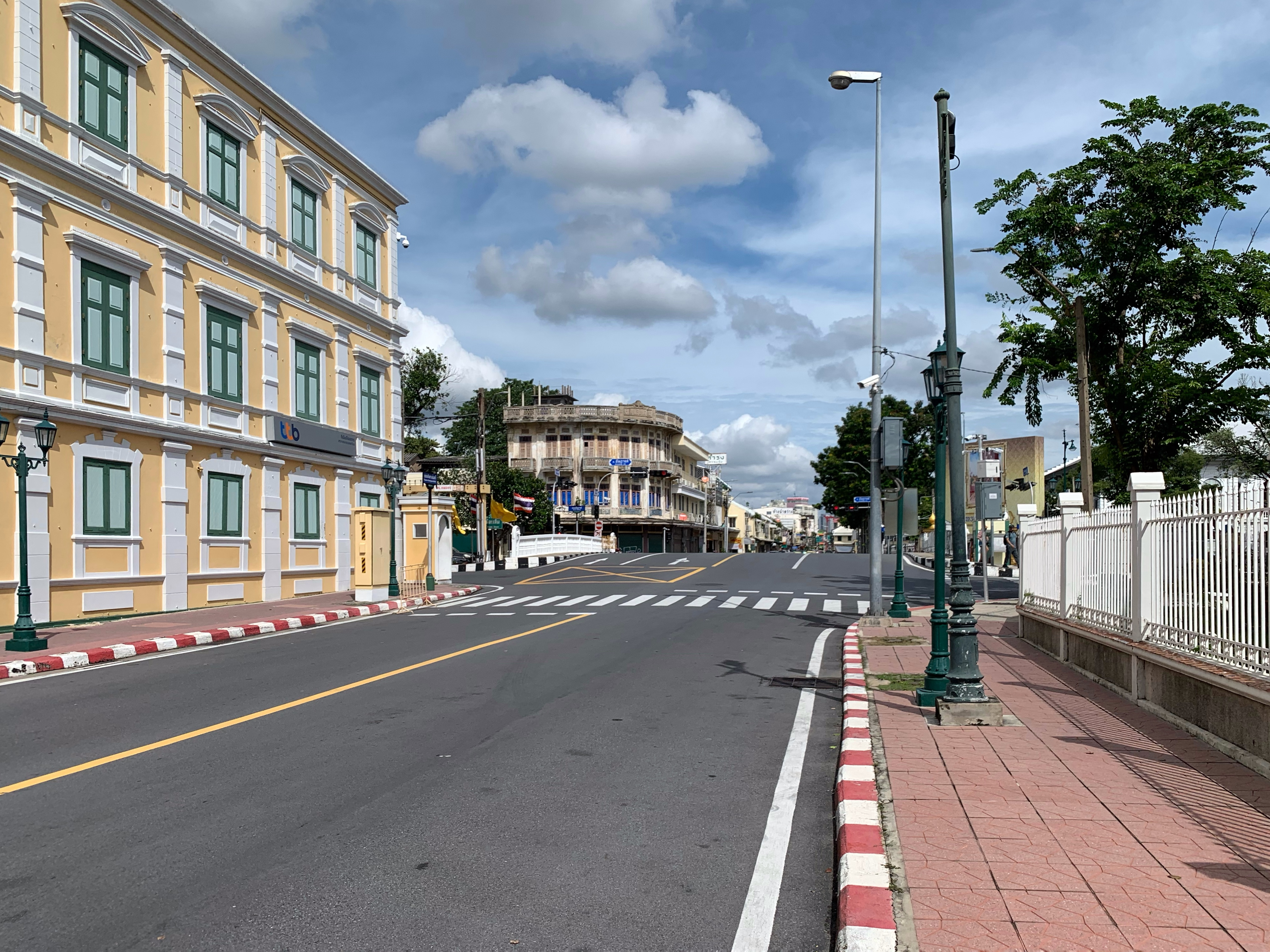
- At the end of Kanlayana Maitri Road, Chang Rong Si Bridge can be seen ahead
- Native name: ถนนกัลยาณไมตรี (Thai)
- Former name: Bamrung Mueang Road
- Location: Phra Borom Maha Ratchawang, Phra Nakhon, Bangkok
- Postal code: 10200
- Coordinates: 13.751136°N 100.494931°E
- East: Chang Rong Si Bridge
- West: Sanam Chai Road

Kanlayana Maitri Road (Thai: ถนนกัลยาณไมตรี, pronounced [tʰā.nŏn kàn.lá.jāː.náː.mai.trí]) is a road in Bangkok's Phra Borom Maha Ratchawang Sub-district, Phra Nakhon District. It's a short road between the headquarters of the Ministry of Defense and the Royal Thai Survey Department. It connects Sanam Chai Road and Chang Rongsi Bridge, at the end of which is the junction of Atsadang and Bamrung Mueang Roads, where Bamrung Mueang Road originates.

The name "Kanlayana Maitri" was given in 1973 in honor of "Phraya Kalyanamaitri" (พระยากัลยาณไมตรี) or Francis B. Sayre Sr., an American lawyer who came to live and work in Siam (today's Thailand) during the reign of King Vajiravudh (Rama VI), and who was a major contributor to Siam's foreign affairs at that time. The road was formerly part of Bamrung Mueang Road before being renamed. This area, near the Saranrom Palace neighborhoods (today's Saranrom Park), was formerly the headquarters of the Ministry of Foreign Affairs.

Kanlayana Maitri Road is recognized as one of the most beautiful roads in Bangkok, partly due to the presence of the Ministry of Defense building along its side. The building was constructed in a Neo-Classical style with Palladian influences. It is beautifully decorated in yellow and features hundreds of windows that open and close alternately, making it a popular spot for photography and filming.
