= Thonburi city moat =

Canal in Bangkok, Thailand

Coordinates: 13.752413°N 100.483371°E

Map showing the extent of the capital during the Thonburi and early Rattanakosin periods; the Thonburi moat marked the western boundary of Thonburi.

The Thonburi city moat (Thai: คลองคูเมืองธนบุรีฝั่งตะวันตก) is the collective name of many several waterways in the form of moats on the Thonburi side or the west bank of the Chao Phraya River, location of Thonburi Kingdom, the former capital of Thailand between the years 1767 to 1782 ruled by a single monarch, King Taksin.

These moats were part of the city moat of the Thonburi Kingdom. They were canalized from natural water furrows surrounded by fruit orchards and green spaces that flow along the west bank of the Chao Phraya River, by order of King Taksin in 1771. The moats served as a fortress to protect the new capital, Thonburi, after the fall of Ayutthaya in 1767. Today, they occupy two adjacent districts of Bangkok: Bangkok Yai and Bangkok Noi.

Some parts were also extend to the east bank of the Chao Phraya River, now known as Khlong Rop Krung and Khlong Khu Mueang Doem, they formed Rattanakosin Island.

The moats were was called separately the name by the quarters that they passed through. Their origins were at the mouth of the Khlong Bangkok Yai next to the Wichai Prasit Fort (Note: A name was changed during King Taksin's reign. Originally double fortresses located on opposite sides of the Chao Phraya River, they were built in the medieval Ayutthaya before King Narai's reign of Prasat Thong dynasty. The forts were renovated and promoted to a major fortress by Greek expatriate noble Constantine Phaulkon, and were also controlled by French and Portuguese mercenaries due to Bangkok at that time had the status of an outpost. Later, the fort on the east side of the Chao Phraya or known today Phra Nakhon side (Bangkok core), was dismantled during King Phetracha's reign of Ban Phlu Luang dynasty after the event Siege of Bangkok (1688).) (previously Bangkok Fort or Wichayen Fort), turn north up till it ends at the mouth of Khlong Bangkok Noi near the present-day Siriraj Hospital and Siriraj Bimuksthan Museum (former site of Bangkok Noi railway station).

Each of the moats was named, and are as follows, from south to north, they are:

1. Khlong Wat Tai Talat, near what are now Wat Molilokkayaram and Khlong Wat Arun
2. Khlong Ban Mo, near what are now Royal Thai Navy Convention Hall and Taweethapisek School, total length 2.56 km (1.6 mi). Its name comes from the fact that it used to be a settlement of the Mon who made and sold pottery just like the Ban Mo area on Rattanakosin Island
3. Khlong Ban Khamin, near what is the area called Ban Khamin and the location of Thonburi Hospital, total length 1.59 km (1.0 mi). The area was once used for cultivating turmeric, which was processed into powder for traditional medicine and skincare. It is said that back then, the fragrance of turmeric filled both sides of the moat
4. Khlong Ban Chang Lo, in the area of Ban Chang Lo to Siriraj Hospital, it is cut across by Khlong Wat Rakhang
5. Khlong Ban Noen, near what is the area called Ban Noen, near Bangkok Noi railway station (now Thon Buri railway station) and the northern end of Itsaraphap Road

The distance between Khlong Wat Tai Talat and Khlong Ban Mo, there is another waterway that cuts through it, Khlong Wat Arun or Khlong Wat Jaeng, officially Khlong Nakhon Ban. It lies to the north of Wat Arun or internationally Temple of Dawn. During the Thonburi period, the location of Wat Arun was annexed to the area of the Thonburi Palace, so this small canal was then the north moat of the Thonburi Palace, the resident of King Taksin. It is a tributary of the Chao Phraya River, which parts from the Chao Phraya to join with Khlong Mon at the side of the temple, total length 1.45 km (0.9 mi). Currently, an extension of Arun Amarin Road spans through it.

In the past, the water in the moats was clear and clean, suitable for consumption. The moats also served as transportation routes and provided habitats for various edible fish and giant freshwater prawns, a local delicacy. Unfortunately, today the moats have become shallow and polluted due to land reclamation for roads and railways, as well as the construction of concrete embankments along their banks. Consequently, these moats no longer serve as fortresses or historical landmarks as they once did.

== See also ==
- Rattanakosin Island
- History of Bangkok
- Thonburi Kingdom
