= Saphan Mon =

Saphan Mon สะพานมอญ
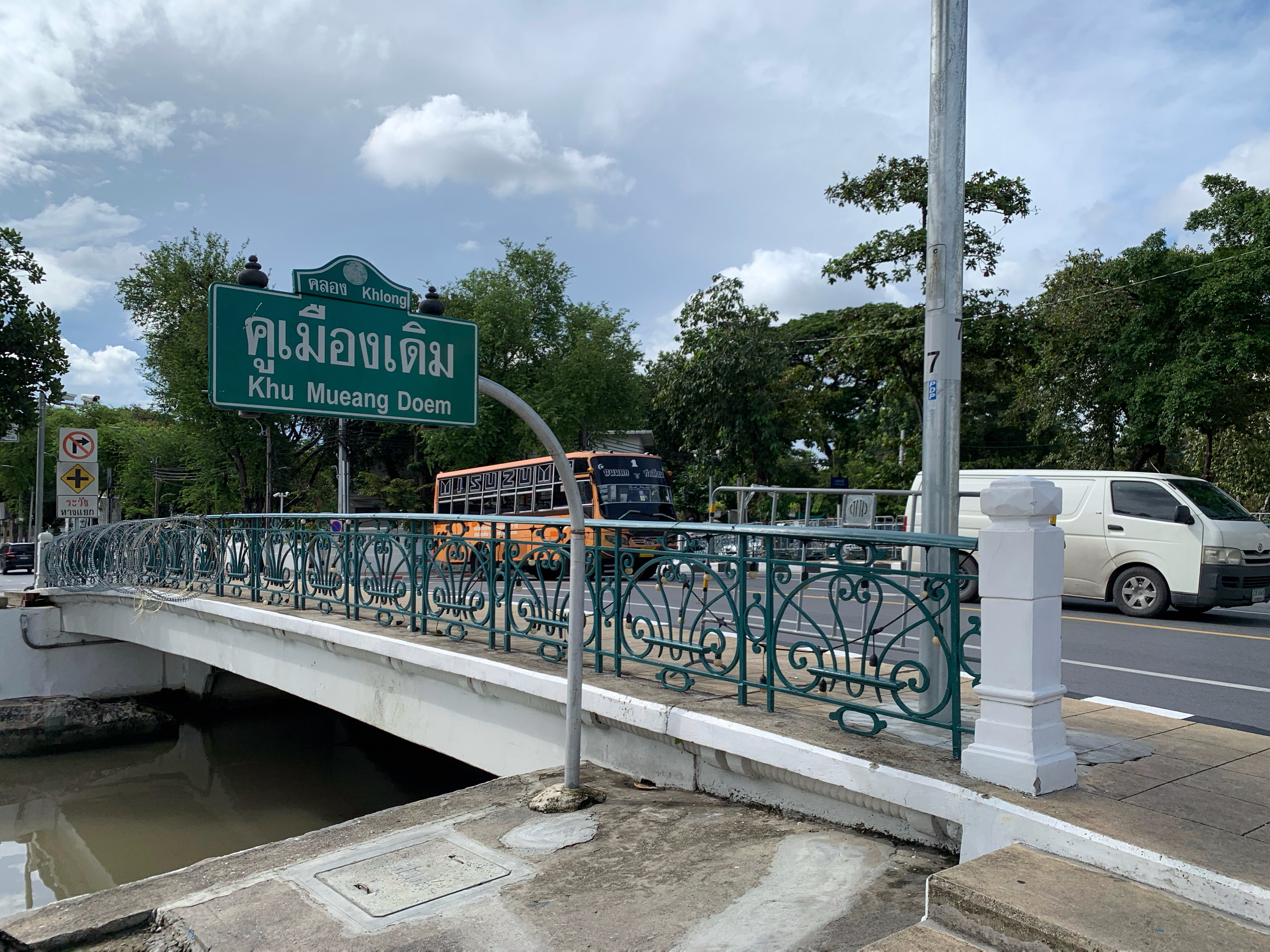
- Saphan Mon in 2021
- Coordinates: 13°44′50″N 100°29′47″E
- Carries: Charoen Krung Road
- Crosses: Khlong Khu Mueang Doem (Old City Moat)
- Locale: Phra Borom Maha Ratchawang and Wang Burapha Phirom Sub-Districts, Phra Nakhon District, Bangkok, Thailand
- Official name: Saphan Mon
- Maintained by: Bangkok Metropolitan Administration (BMA)

Characteristics
- Design: Art Nouveau

Saphan Mon (Thai: สะพานมอญ, pronounced [sā.pʰāːn mɔ̄ːn]; lit. 'Mon Bridge') is a historic bridge in Bangkok's Phra Nakhon District. It carries Charoen Krung Road across the old city moat, and was originally built in the reign of King Nangklao (Rama III, 1824–1851), presumably by members of the Mon community who lived nearby. In those days, Mon traders used to settle their boathouses in the area of the bridge. During the reign of King Vajiravudh (Rama VI, 1910–1925), the original wooden structure was replaced with a reinforced concrete bridge with iron railings demonstrating Art Nouveau influence. The bridge is registered as an ancient monument by the Fine Arts Department.

At the east end of the bridge, Charoen Krung crosses Atsadang Roads at its first intersection, known for a historic driving school founded in 1947.
