= Ban Noen =

Ban Noen (Thai: บ้านเนิน) may refer to:

- Ban Noen, Bangkok, a road junction and neighbourhood in Bangkok Noi District, Bangkok
- Ban Noen Subdistrict, a subdistrict (tambon) in Chian Yai District, Nakhon Si Thammarat
- Ban Noen Subdistrict, a subdistrict (tambon) in Lom Kao District, Phetchabun
