= Royal Thai Survey Department =

Coordinates: 13°45′03.6″N 100°29′43.08″E

- กรมแผนที่ทหาร
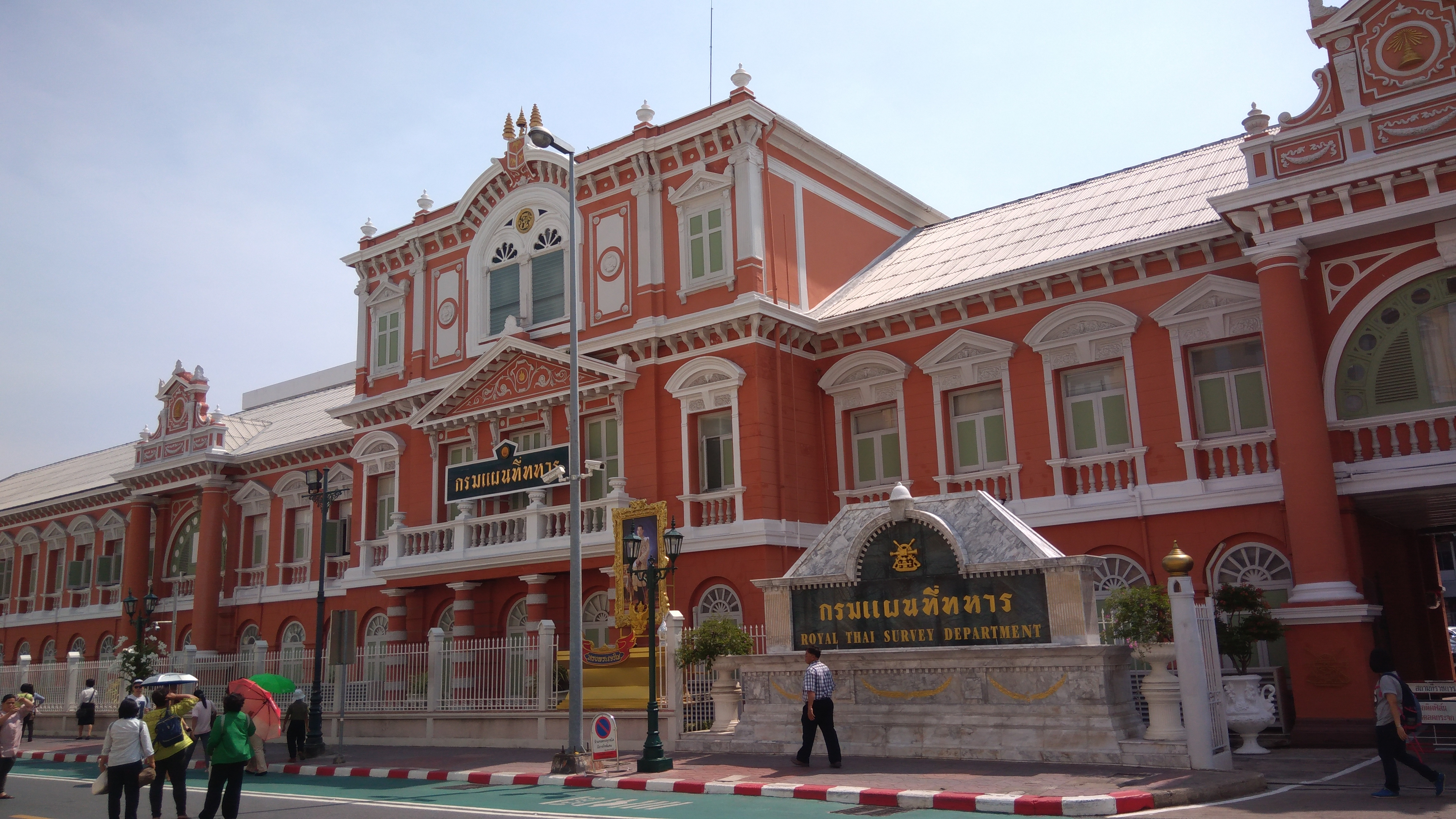
- Royal Thai Survey Department in 2017
- Active: 1957–present
- Country: Thailand
- Branch: Royal Thai Army
- Part of: Royal Thai Armed Forces
- Website: www.rtsd.mi.th/main/language/en

The Royal Thai Survey Department (Thai: กรมแผนที่ทหาร) is a Special Services Group of Headquarters, Royal Thai Armed Forces (กองบัญชาการกองทัพไทย) tasked with conducting land and aerial survey, geodesy and geophysics works in Thailand. The headquarters of the Survey Department are located on Kanlayan Maitri Road in the Phra Borom Maha Ratchawang Subdistrict of Phra Nakhon District, Bangkok, and the current Department Director is Lieutenant General Noppadon Chotisiri.

Modern map surveying in Thailand began in 1875 during the reign of King Chulalongkorn (Rama V) with the establishment of a Mapping Division under the direction of British expatriate Henry Alabaster to lay out the map for telegraphic activities linking Bangkok to Phra Tabong (Battambang) and also to map around the Thai Gulf.

Prince Damrong (then known as Phra Ong Chao Ditsawarakuman) conceived the idea of forming a Survey Department. King Rama V granted the establishment of the Thai Survey School in 1882, with initial recruits coming from the Royal Guards. A royal decree issued September 3, 1885, separated the surveyors from the royal bodyguard and created the Royal Survey Department.

The department then engaged in cadastral survey, which is the survey of specific land parcels to define ownership for land registration, and for equitable taxation. Land title deeds are issued using the Torrens title system, though it was not until the year 1901 that the first–fruits of this survey were obtained.

The first Department Director, Ronald Worthy Giblin, F.R.G.S., noted when survey began in 1896, "It so happens that 40 metres or 4,000 centimetres are equal to one sen in Thai units of measurement, so all cadastral plans are plotted, drawn, and printed to a scale of 1:4,000." The department also engages in the production and sale of detailed maps, which initially were made by the process of zincography.

To alleviate a scarcity of banknotes in the country during the Greater East Asia War, the department printed a special series of banknotes in 4 denominations, 1, 10, 20 and 100, like those of the 4th series ordered from Thomas de la Rue and Co., London. The phrase “the Royal Thai Survey” at the lower center of the front and back replaced that of de le Rue starting in 1942.

== See also ==
- Great Trigonometric Survey
- History of cartography
- Principal Triangulation of Britain
- Pundit (explorer)
- Survey of India
