= Pig Memorial and Pi Kun Bridge =

Monument in Phra Nakhon district, Bangkok, Thailand

Coordinates: 13°44′59.2″N 100°29′46.43″E

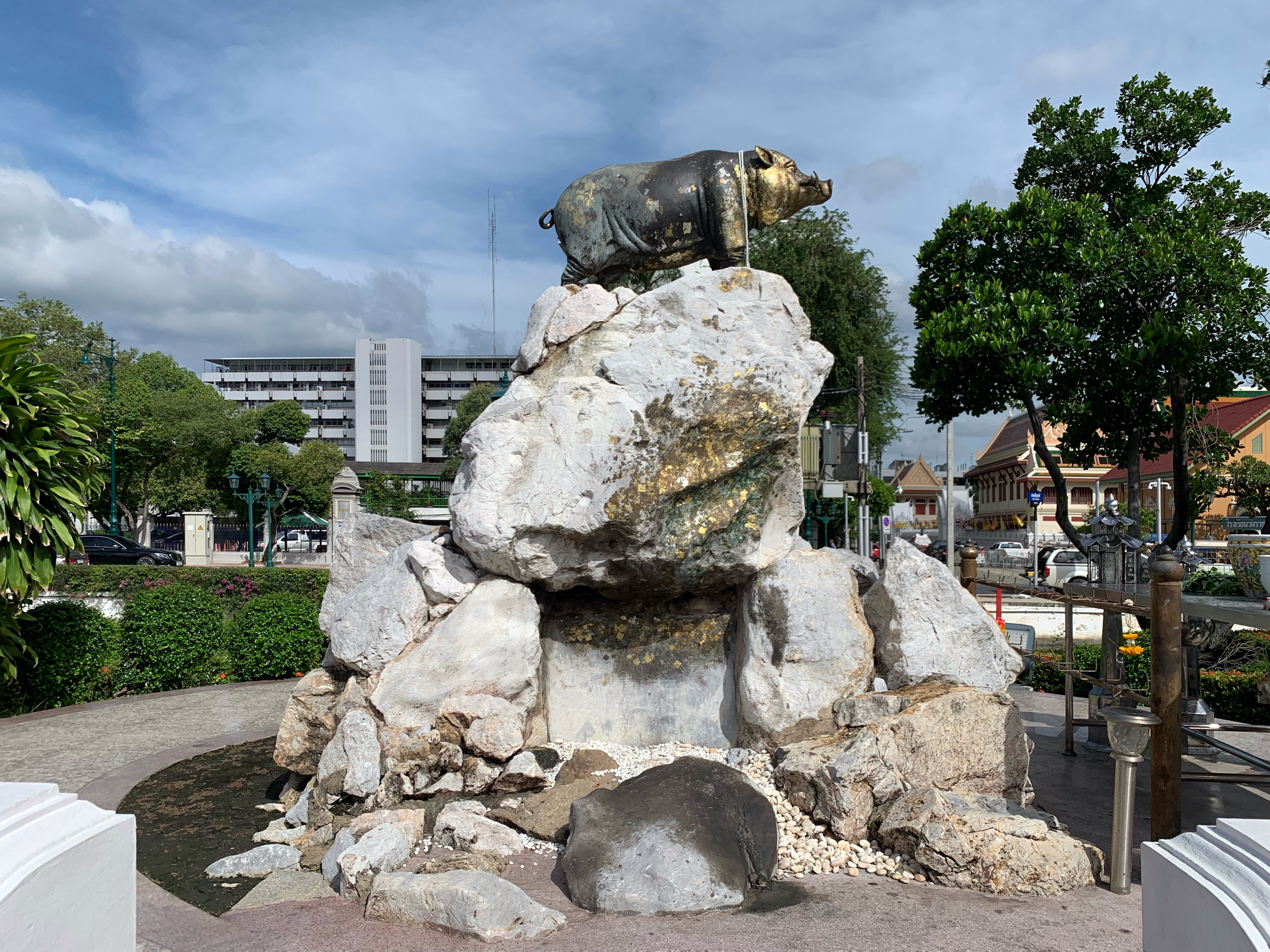
Pig Memorial in 2021

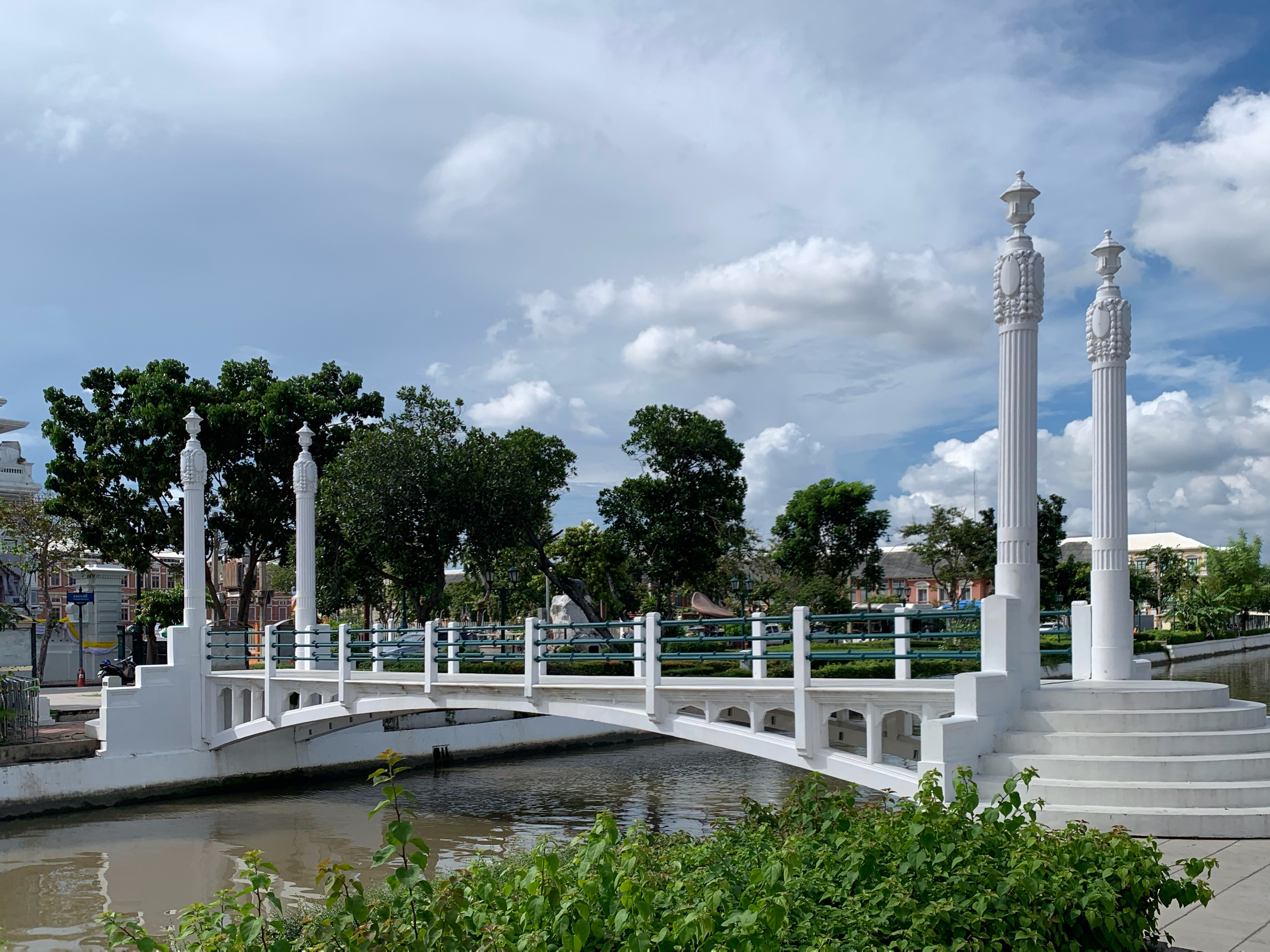
Pi Kun Bridge in 2021

Pig Memorial (Thai: อนุสาวรีย์หมู) is a memorial in Phra Borom Maha Ratchawang sub-district, Phra Nakhon district, Bangkok. It is located in the inner city or Rattanakosin Island which is a historic area of the city.

Pig Memorial was built in 1913, the year of Queen Saovabha Phongsri's 50th Birthday Anniversary. Its official name is "Sahachart Memorial" (อนุสาวรีย์สหชาติ), which refers to "The Memorial of Those Who Were Born in The Same Year", which were Prince Narisara Nuvadtivongs, Phraya Phiphat Kosa (Celestino Xavier), and Phraya Ratcha Songkhram (Kon Hongsakul), all of the three had jointly built the memorial as a gesture of gratitude to the queen. The pig sculpture of the memorial is made of gilded cast metal. Initially, the sculpture was resting on large stone pillars, which have since been replaced by a higher, mountain-shaped concrete base. Its purpose is to honor the year of the pig which was the queen's year of birth, as well as the three donors. The memorial was designed by Prince Narisara Nuvadtivongs, who was one of the donors.

Pi Kun Bridge or Thai called "Saphan Pi Kun" (สะพานปีกุน) or commonly "Saphan Mu" (สะพานหมู). The bridge was built in 1911, two years before the Pig Memorial. Its name refers to "The Bridge of Year of The Pig". Its structure is cemented adjacent to the memorial, which is located in the west of the bridge. Pi Kun Bridge is a pedestrian overpass across Khlong Khu Mueang Doem (old city moat), better known as Khlong Lot (tube canal) considered as a bridge over Khlong Lot that is between Saphan Hok and Saphan Chang Rong Si. The bridge has four decorative posts symbolizing birthday candles of the fourth cycle, with oval plates on each post representing the cycle of the birthday. Initially, it was unnamed until a Pig Memorial was built nearby.

At present, they have been registered as ancient monuments in Bangkok.
