= Thonburi Hospital =

Private hospital in Bangkok, Thailand

Coordinates: 13°45′11.9″N 100°28′47.3″E

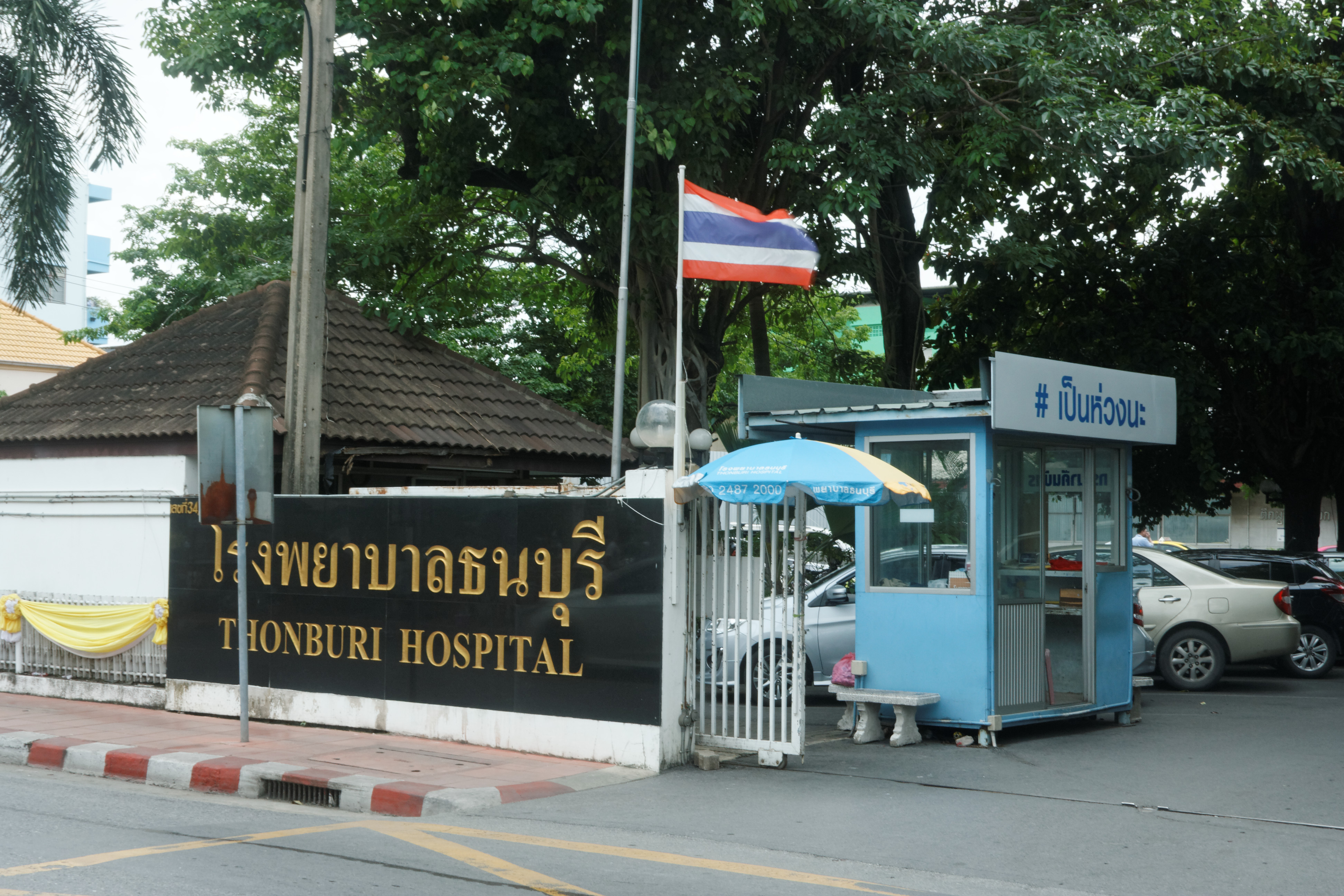
Thonburi Hospital sign in 2019

Thonburi Hospital (Thai: โรงพยาบาลธนบุรี) is a private hospital under Thonburi Healthcare Group, located on Soi Itsaraphap 44 (Soi Saeng Sueksa), Itsaraphap Road, Ban Chang Lo Subdistrict, Bangkok Noi District, Bangkok. Established on May 10, 1977, by Dr. Boon Vanasin.

Thonburi Hospital is the first private hospital of Thonburi side (west bank of Chao Phraya River). It is located near Siriraj Hospital.

Currently, the hospital has more than 350 physicians and 435 beds for 24 hours.

== Hospitals in the network ==
- Thonburi-Uthong Hospital (Suphan Buri)
- Thonburi 2 Hospital (Thawi Watthana)
- Ratchaphruek Hospital (Khon Kaen)
- Roi-et Thonburi Hospital (Roi Et)
- Kalasin Thonburi Hospital (Kalasin)
- Ubonrak Thonburi Hospital (Ubon Ratchathani)
- Rajthanee Hospital (Phra Nakhon Si Ayutthaya)
- Phatara-Thonburi Hospital (Pathum Thani)
- Sirivej Hospital (Chanthaburi)
- Thonburi-Chumphon Hospital (Chumphon)
- Nakhonchristian Hospital (Nakhon Si Thammarat)
- Trangruampat Hospital (Trang)
- Rajyindee Hospital (Songkhla)
- Thonburi Bamrungmuang Hospital (Bamrung Mueang)
- Thonburi Bangsue Hospital (Chatuchak)
