= Ministry of Defence headquarters (Thailand) =

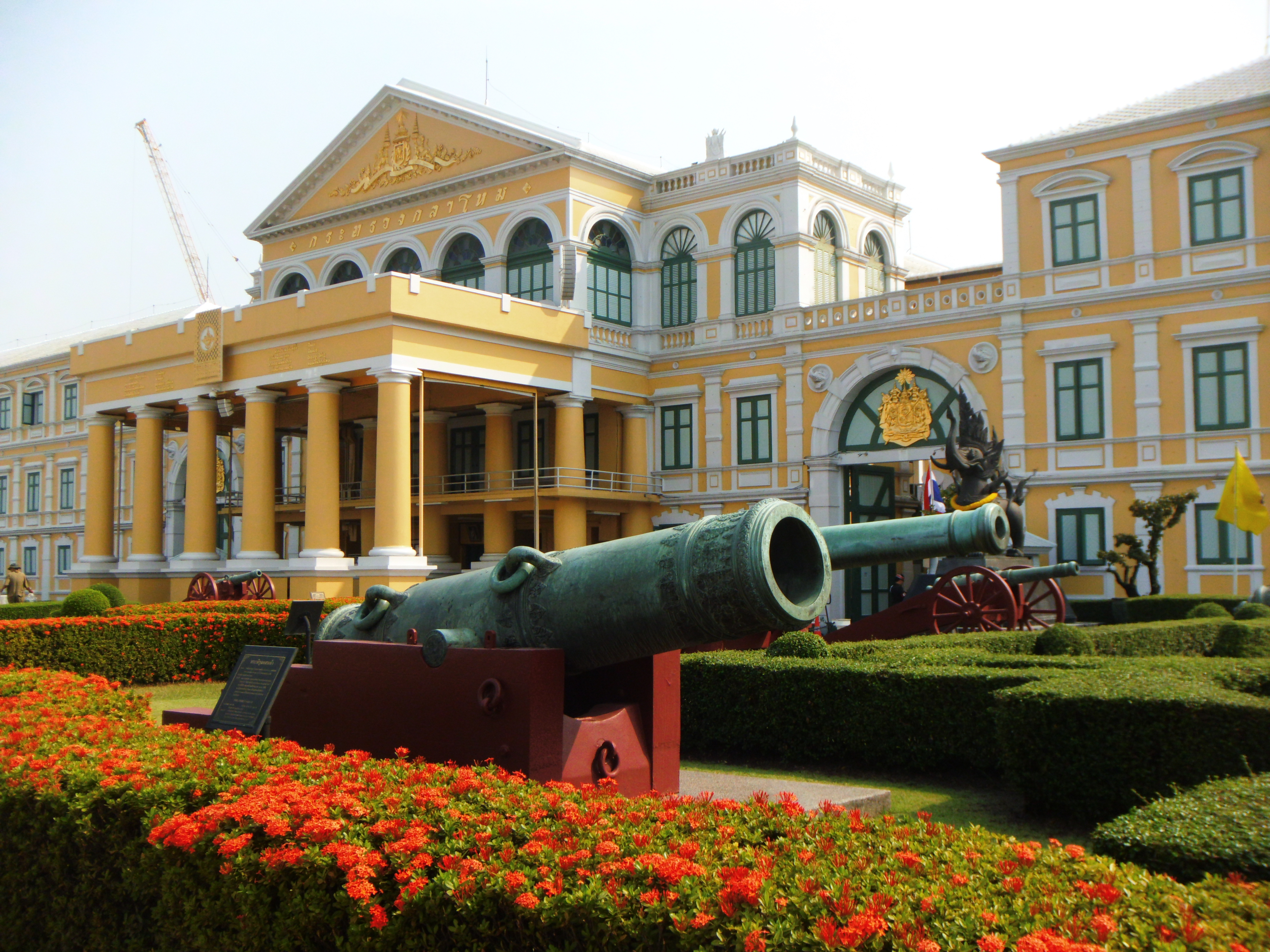
- The building in 2016, showing the pediment (with later-added portico) and cannons in the foreground

General information
- Architectural style: Neo-Palladian
- Location: Phra Nakhon District, Bangkok
- Coordinates: 13°45′6″N 100°29′40″E
- Opening: 1884

Design and construction
- Architect: Joachim Grassi

The Ministry of Defence headquarters is a historic building in Bangkok's Phra Nakhon District. It sits opposite the Grand Palace on Sanam Chai Road, in the heart of the historic Rattanakosin Island. The building, in the neo-Palladian style of the neoclassical movement, was built as the Front Soldiers' Barracks in 1882–1884 to designs by Italian architect Joachim Grassi. It has served as the headquarters of the Ministry of Defence since the ministry's establishment in 1887.

== History ==
The site of the building, just east of the Grand Palace and south of the City Pillar Shrine, used to be the location of three former princely palaces built in the reign of King Rama I (1782–1809). By the time of King Chulalongkorn (Rama V, 1868–1910), the palaces had become disused, and parts of the site were occupied by granaries, stables and silkworm-rearing houses.

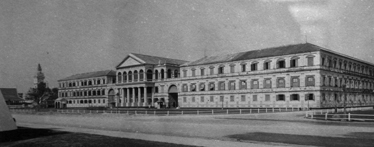
The building, c. 1880s–1900s

Chulalongkorn worked extensively to modernize the country, including replacing the system of corvée labour with a professional standing military. A regiment known as Thahan Na ("front soldiers"), consisting of about 4,400 men, was created in late 1870s to guard the capital. The need for a permanent residence for the force soon became apparent in the aftermath of a cholera outbreak, during which many soldiers died. The regiment commander Chaomuen Waiworanat (later known as Chaophraya Surasakmontri) accordingly requested that a barracks be built, and construction took place on the site from 1882 to 1884. The building was designed by Italian architect Joachim Grassi, while Surasakmontri oversaw the construction. The building was inaugurated by Chulalongkorn on 18 July 1884. With the formal establishment of the Ministry of Defence in 1887, the building became the ministry's headquarters, a role which it holds to the present.

== Architecture ==
The building is designed in neo-Palladian style, following a three-storey rectangular floor plan with a central courtyard, built of masonry with load-bearing walls. The façade, facing west towards the Grand Palace, is marked by a central pediment supported by Doric-order columns, which is flanked by two wings with gates leading into the courtyard. Windows line all three levels of the building's exterior, which is decorated with pilasters in superimposed order.

While the front of the building is perfectly symmetrical, its wings taper towards the rear, as necessitated by the shape of the plot, which the building entirely fills except for the front lawn. It is surrounded by streets on all sides (Sanam Chai to the west, Lak Mueang to the north, Rachini to the east, and Kanlayana Maitri to the south). According to the original plans, the central structure was to contain an armoury and military museum on the top floor, officer's meeting rooms on the middle, and sword-fighting practice areas below. The wings housed sleeping quarters on the upper floor, meeting and training rooms on the middle, and armouries and provisions storage areas on the lower floor. The north wing hosted artillery units, a military hospital, and stables, while the south wing hosted infantry and engineering units. At the rear of the south wing was a connected clock tower (since removed), which also housed water pumps and storage tanks—the building was built with metal plumbing. The central courtyard was used for drills and exercises.

The building has undergone several additions, including an extended portico at the front, a new section running alongside the original northern wing, and annexes at the rear (east side) of the complex, where a granary and bathing and swimming pools used to be located. The building received the ASA Architectural Conservation Award in 1997, and was registered as an ancient monument by the Fine Arts Department in 1998.

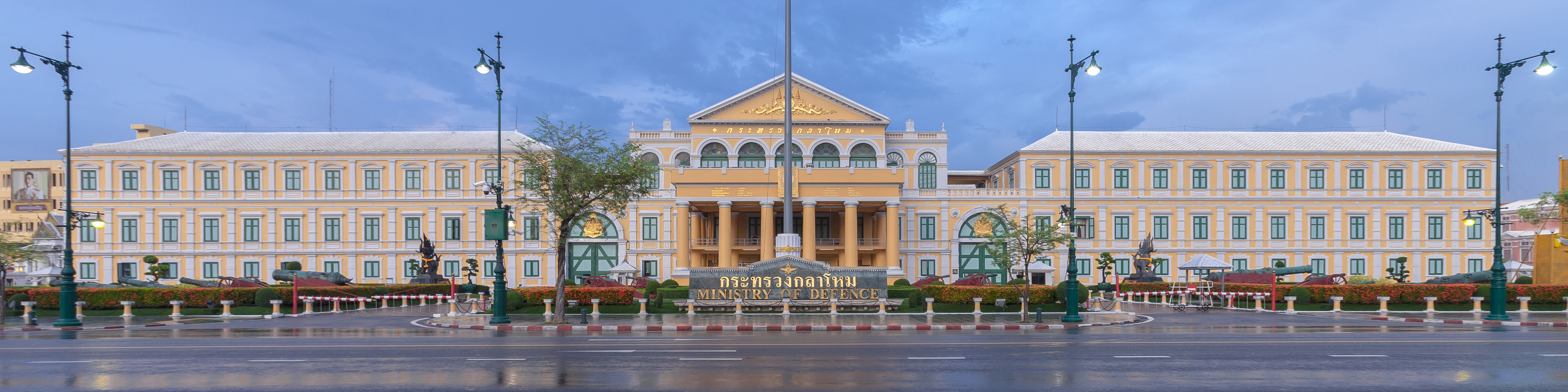
Panoramic view showing the entire façade

== Cannon museum ==
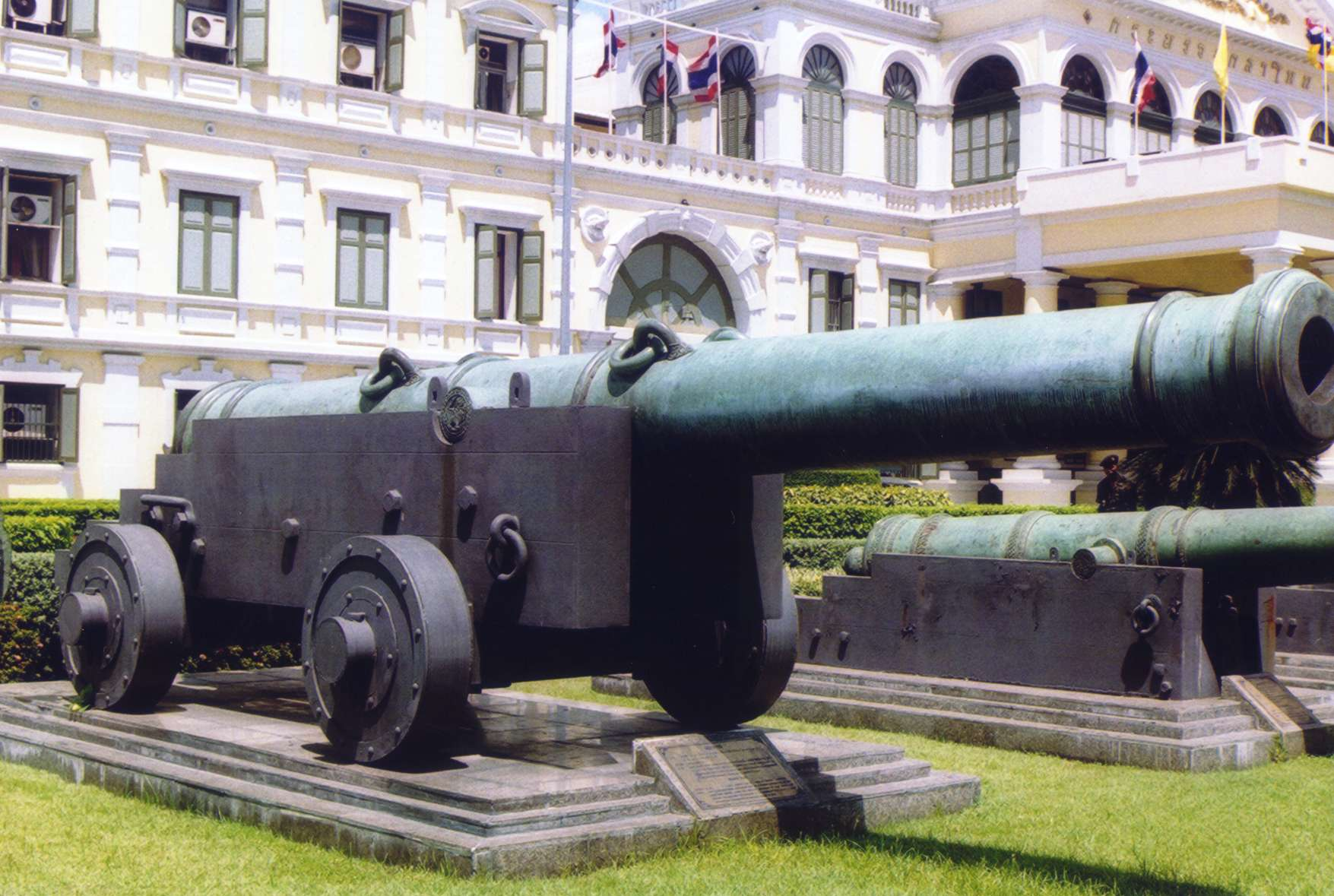
The Phaya Tani cannon in 2003, pointing away from the building

In the front lawns of the building, arranged in a garden display, are a large collection of bronze cannons. The display was initiated by King Vajiravudh (Rama VI, r. 1910–1925), who was probably inspired by his experience at the Royal Military College, Sandhurst. Sixty-three guns were once displayed on the lawn, according to a 1921 survey, but many have been relocated and forty currently remain. Almost all of the cannons bear inscribed names, such as "Uprooter of Phra Sumeru" (ถอนพระสุเมรุ) and "The Wind that destroyeth the Earth" (ลมประไลยกัลป์). The largest and most famous is the Phaya Tani, which was captured from Pattani (then capital of the Pattani Kingdom) in 1786.

The display has been reorganized many times. In 2004, several guns including the Phaya Tani were rotated to face the building, prompting rumours that the ministry was trying to avoid bad luck resulting from the guns pointing towards the Grand Palace, as they had previously done, in an attempt to alleviate the South Thailand insurgency. This was denied by ministry permanent secretary General Oud Buangbon, who said that it was part of a re-landscaping project, done in accordance with a request from the Ministry of Tourism and Sports and advice from the Fine Arts Department, and also to mark the ministry's 120th anniversary.

The display has since been reorganized again, so that all the guns now point sideways. In 2014, the ministry inaugurated the exhibit as an outdoor museum, titled the Ancient Artillery Museum, with information placards and scheduled guided tours. The garden also features two large gajasiha statues and musical fountains.
