= San Chaopho Suea subdistrict =

Coordinates: 13°45′11.7″N 100°29′50.0″E

San Chaopho Suea
- Khwaeng
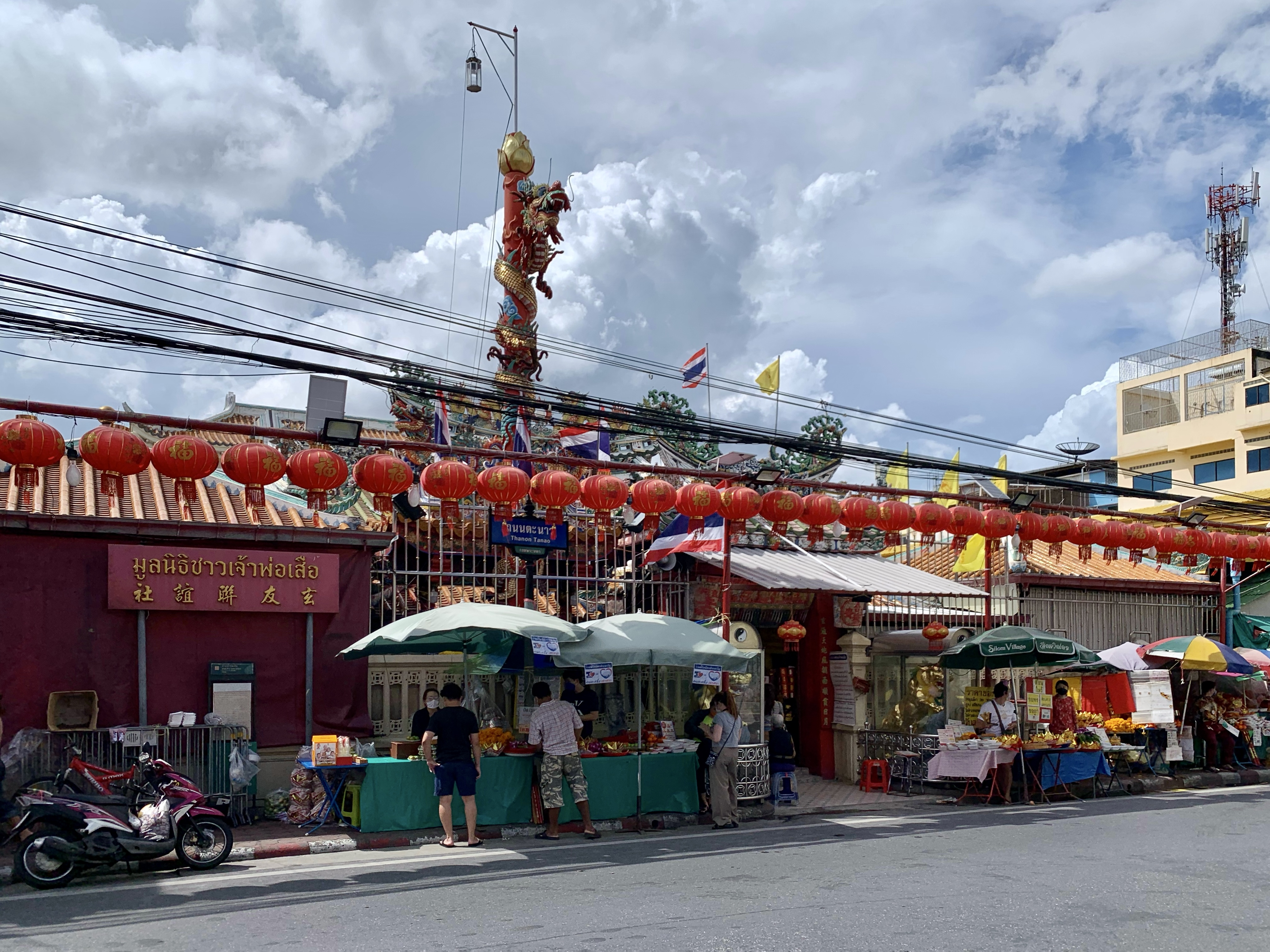
- The eponymous San Chaopho Suea Shrine

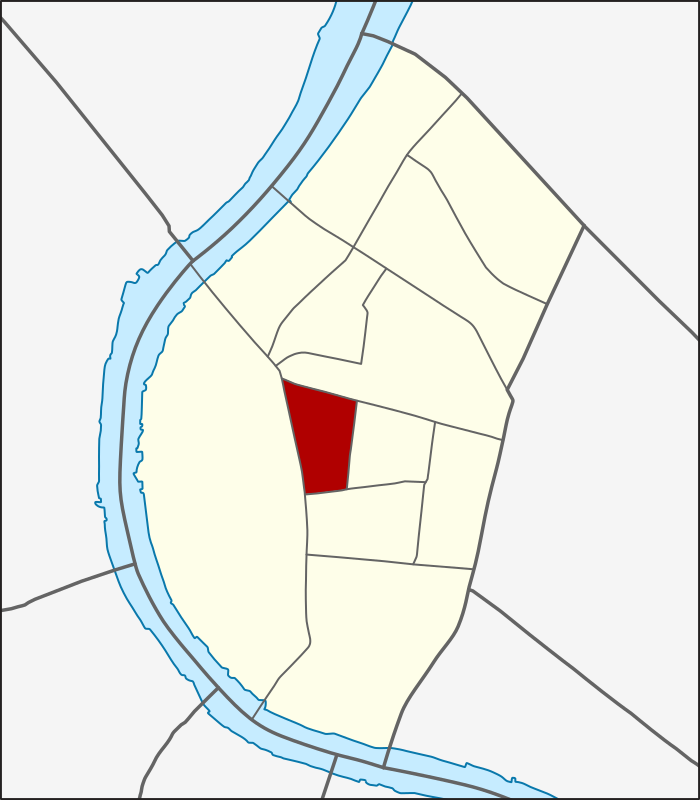
- Location in Phra Nakhon District
- Country: Thailand
- Province: Bangkok
- Khet: Phra Nakhon

Area
  - Total: 0.144 km^{2} (0.056 sq mi)

Population (2018)
  - Total: 3,260
  - Density: 22,638.88/km^{2} (58,634.4/sq mi)
- Time zone: UTC+7 (ICT)
- Postal code: 10200
- TIS 1099: 100105

San Chaopho Suea (Thai: ศาลเจ้าพ่อเสือ, pronounced [sǎːn t͡ɕâw.pʰɔ̂ː sɯ̌a̯]) is a khwaeng (subdistrict) of Phra Nakhon District, Bangkok.

== History ==
It is named after San Chaopho Suea, an ancient Chinese joss house of Xuanwu or "Chaopho Suea" (Tiger God) in Thai. It has been built since the King Nangklao (Rama III)'s reign in early Rattanakosin era. Originally it was situated on Bamrung Mueang Road, later in the King Chulalongkorn (Rama V)'s reign, it has moved to Tanao Road like today. The building of the joss house was built in the southern Chinese architectural style. Today, it is regarded as one of the most well-known and respected Chinese joss houses.

== Geography ==
Neighbouring subdistricts are, clockwise from north: Bowon Niwet (Khlong Lot Wat Ratchanadda is a divider line), Sao Chingcha (Tanao Road is a divider line), Wat Ratchabophit (Bamrung Mueang Road is a divider line), Phra Borom Maha Ratchawang (Khlong Khu Mueang Doem is a divider line). All in Phra Nakhon District.

== Places ==
- San Chaopho Suea
- Sam Phraeng: a historic neighbourhood consists of Phraeng Phuthon, Phraeng Nara, and Phraeng Sanphasat. It is old town is lined with street stalls, shops and picturesque historic buildings with Sino-Portuguese architecture.
- Wat Buranasiri Mattayaram: an ancient third class royal Thai temple on Atsadang Road.
- Phranakorn Commercial Technological College: the first commercial school in Thailand.
