= Ban Khamin =

Coordinates: 13°45′08.54″N 100°29′00.88″E

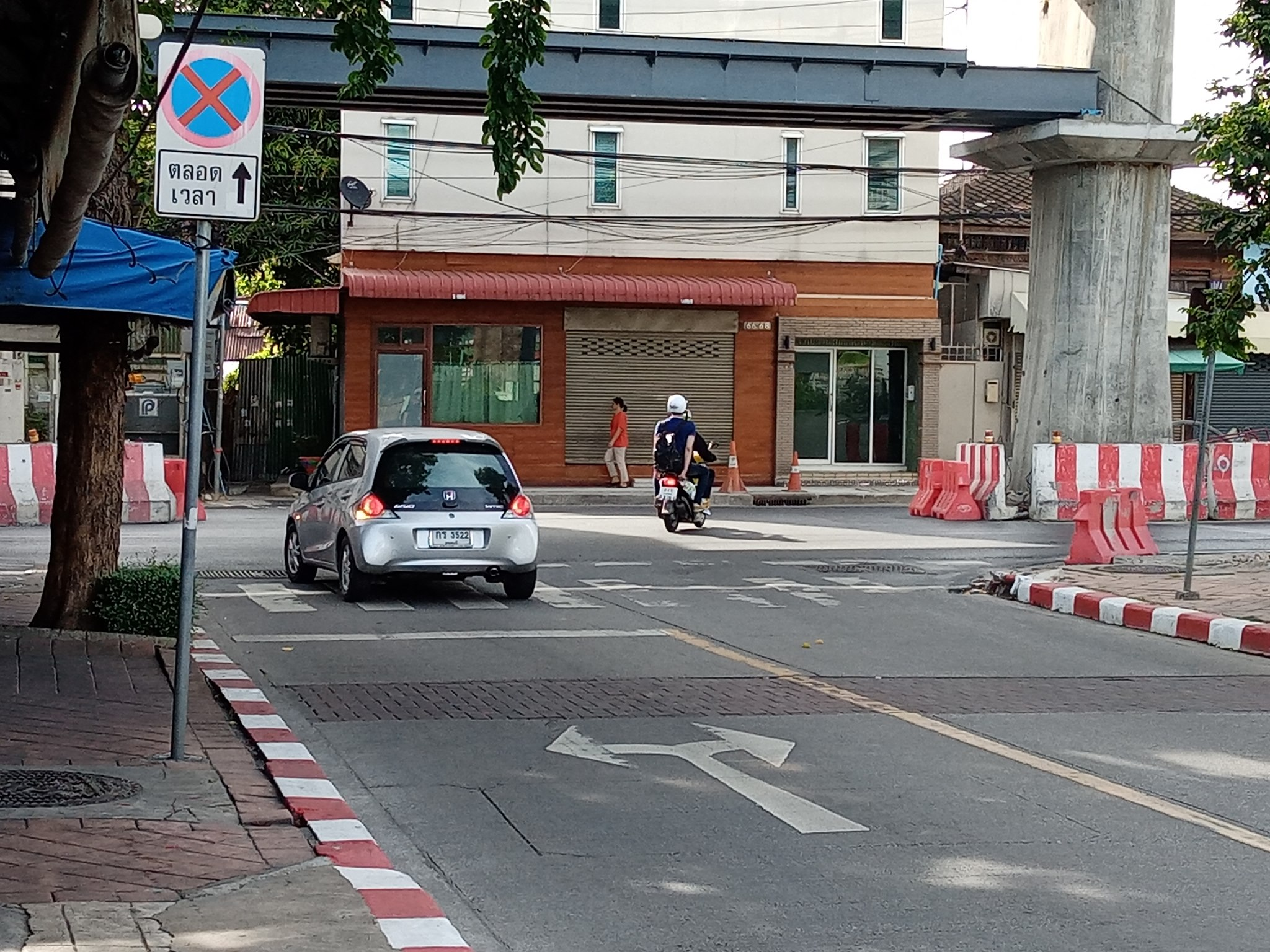
Ban Khamin Junction (taken from Soi Itsaraphap 44)

Ban Khamin (Thai: บ้านขมิ้น, pronounced [bâːn kʰā.mîn]) is a road junction and historic neighbourhood in Siri Rat Subdistrict, Bangkok Noi District, on the Thonburi side of Bangkok. It lies at the three-way junction of Arun Ammarin Road and Soi Itsaraphap 44 (also known as Saeng Sueksa), and is home to Thonburi Hospital.

== History & characteristics ==
The name "Ban Khamin" (lit. 'turmeric village') dates back to the Thonburi period (1767–1782), before the rise of the Rattanakosin Kingdom. The area was once known for its production of turmeric powder, which is a key ingredient in traditional Thai medicine. Today, that cottage industry has disappeared, though one shop still survives near nearby Phran Nok Intersection. The name "Ban Khamin" remains in use.

In addition to the junction, the neighbourhood includes Khlong Ban Khamin, a 1.5 km (0.9 mi) canal near Siriraj Hospital, and San Chaopho Ban Khamin Pung Thao Kong, a small Teochew joss house dating to the Qing dynasty's Guangxu reign.

After World War II, Ban Khamin was also known for its second-class cinema, Ban Khamin Theatre, popular among locals when Thonburi was still largely rural. The theatre was tragically destroyed by fire on the morning of Sunday, August 16, 1970, resulting in several deaths including a four-year-old boy. The site is now occupied by a veterinary clinic and a parking lot.

From Soi Itsaraphap 44, one road leads to Ban Chang Lo, a historic neighbourhood where locals make Buddha statues using traditional metal-casting techniques. Another road leads to "Trok Matum" (formerly Ban Plueak Som O), known for its production of sweet bael preserves. The area is now known as "Soi Suan Anan" and "Soi Matum".

== Nearby places ==
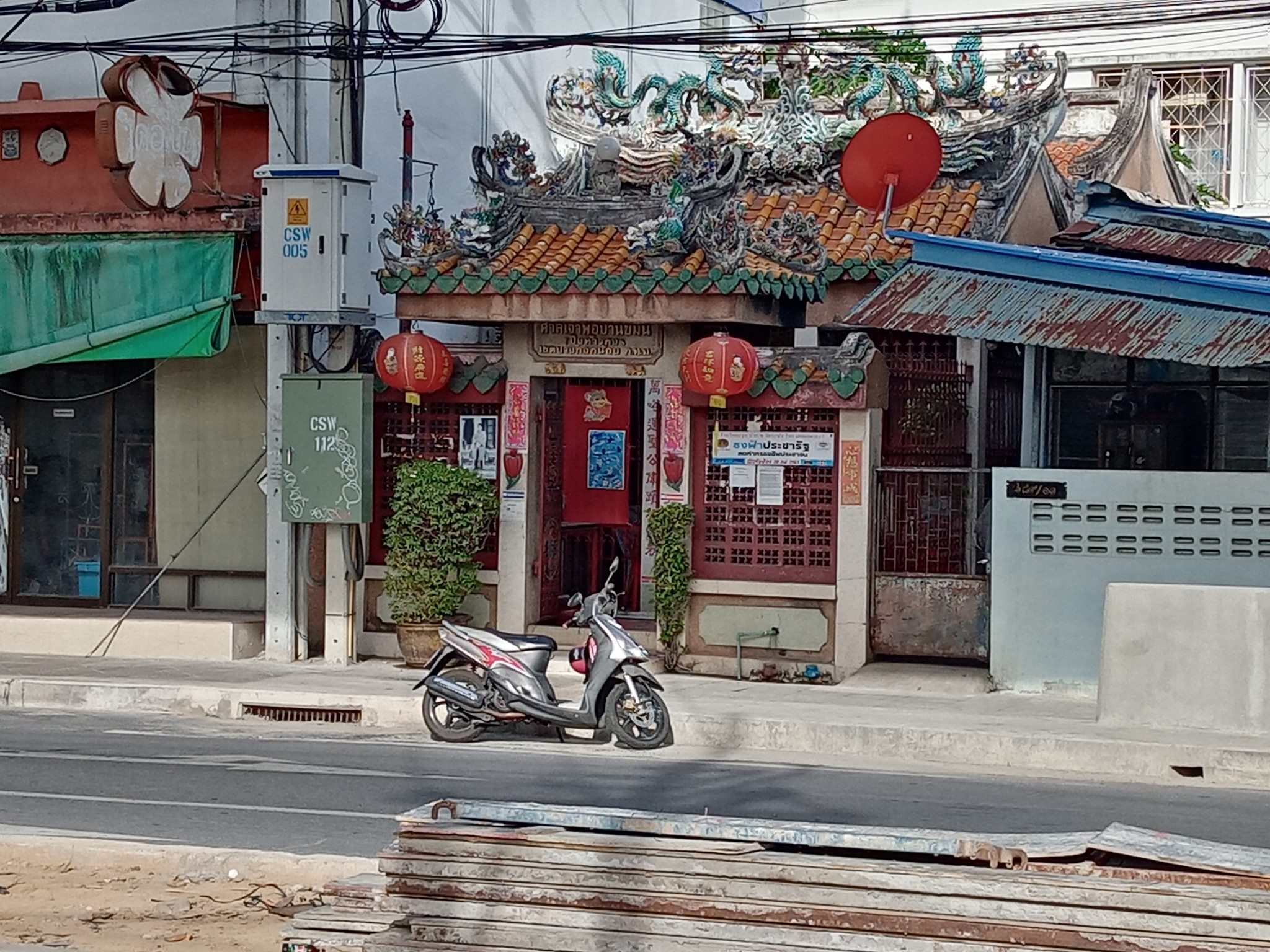
Chaopho Ban Khamin Pung Thao Kong Joss House

- Wat Rakhangkhositaram
- Siriraj Hospital
- Wang Lang Market
- Wat Phraya Tham Worawihan
- Thonburi Hospital
- Navy Park Club

== See also ==
- Ban Noen
