= Ban Noen, Bangkok =

Historic neighbourhood and road junction in Thonburi side, Bangkok

Coordinates: 13°45′35.51″N 100°28′40.21″E

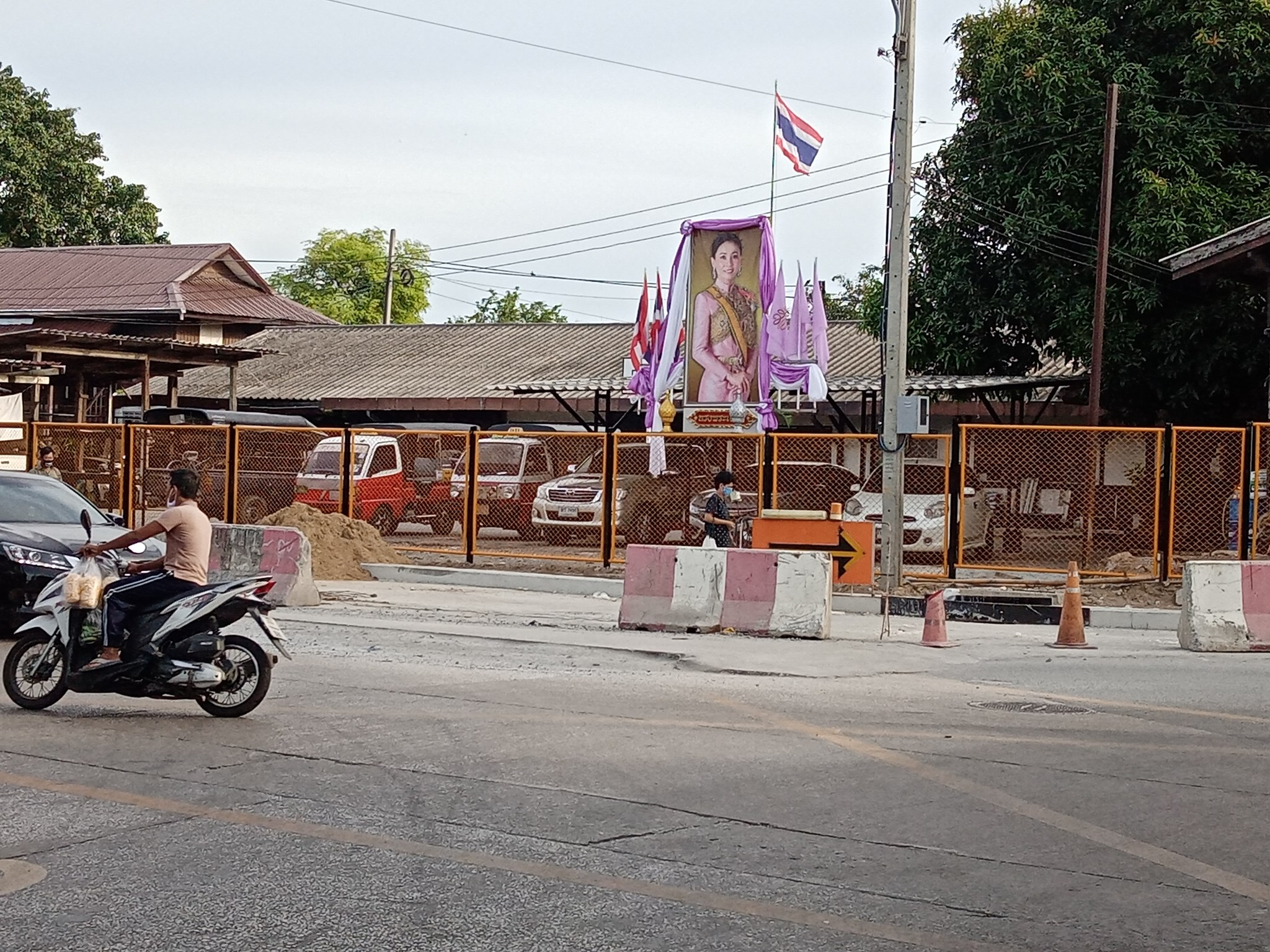
Ban Noen Junction in June 2020

Ban Noen (Thai: บ้านเนิน, pronounced [bâːn nɤ̄ːn]) is a historic neighbourhood and road junction located in the Siri Rat and Ban Chang Lo subdistricts of Bangkok Noi District, on the Thonburi side of Bangkok. It marks the three-way junction where Itsaraphap, Rot Fai, and Sutthawat roads meet. The boundaries of the junction are defined by the starting points of Rot Fai and Sutthawat roads, and the end of Itsaraphap road. Located nearby is Thonburi railway station, once a key transportation hub of western Bangkok and a historic terminal with deep ties to the area's development.

== History ==
The name "Ban Noen" (lit. 'slope county') comes from "Ban Noen Khai Luang" (บ้านเนินค่ายหลวง, [bâːn nəːn kʰâj lǔa̯ŋ]), which dates back to the Thonburi period (1767 to 1782). The area is known for its traditional craftsmanship in making khong wong (ฆ้องวง), a Thai musical instrument made from metal using casting and forging techniques. Khong wong produced in Ban Noen are recognized for their fine quality and resonant sound. The craft is not as old as other traditional professions in Bangkok Noi, as it began only shortly before World War II. Today, only one manufacturer remains.

Not far from Ban Noen is the community of Ban Bu, known for its bronze casting work. Situated along the southern bank of Khlong Bangkok Noi, Ban Bu was the only community on the Thonburi side that bordered the Imperial Japanese Army base during World War II. As a result, the area was frequently bombed by Allied forces at night.

In earlier times, residents near Ban Noen earned their living by making khao mao mai, a traditional Thai snack made from pounded unripe rice. Today, many of them have shifted to producing kalamae (a Thai version of dodol) and khao niao daeng, a sweet made from whole grain sticky rice and sugar, which is widely used in Songkran festival offerings.

== See also ==
- Ban Khamin
