= Ban Chang Lo =

Coordinates: 13°45′20.6″N 100°28′56.5″E

Ban Chang Lo บ้านช่างหล่อ
- Khwaeng
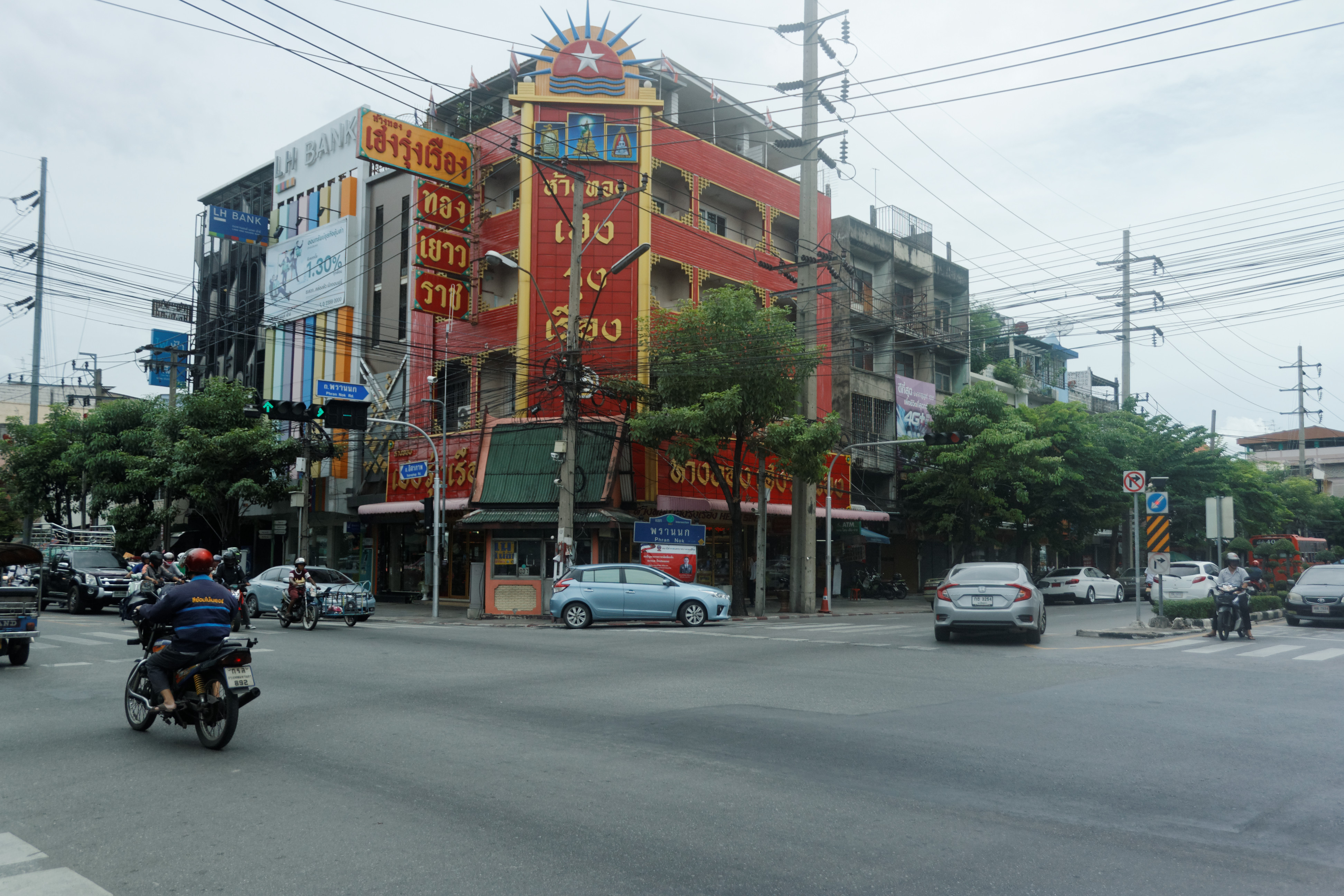
- Phran Nok Intersection as seen from Itsaraphap Road in 2018. Ban Chang Lo lies to the left, in the direction the two cars are turning, while Siriraj is on the right

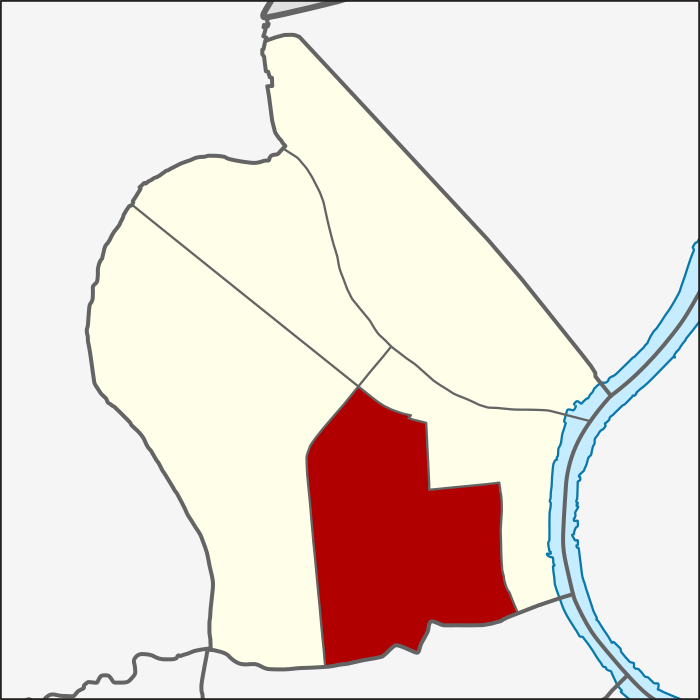
- Location in Bangkok Noi District
- Country: Thailand
- Province: Bangkok
- Khet: Bangkok Noi

Area
  - Total: 2.076 km^{2} (0.802 sq mi)

Population (2020)
  - Total: 29,122
- Time zone: UTC+7 (ICT)
- Postal code: 10700
- TIS 1099: 102005

Ban Chang Lo (Thai: บ้านช่างหล่อ, pronounced [bâːn t͡ɕʰâ(ː)ŋ lɔ̀ː]) is one of five subdistricts (khwaeng) and namesake historic neighbourhood in Bangkok Noi District, Bangkok's Thonburi side (west bank of Chao Phraya River).

== History ==
The name Ban Chang Lo means "Village of Casters," reflecting the community's history dating back to the Thonburi and early Rattanakosin periods, when their ancestors worked as Buddha image casters. They were highly skilled and often served in the royal court, contributing to important ceremonies such as royal cremations.

In the past, Ban Chang Lo was a relatively small area: bordered by Phran Nok Road to the north, Soi Itsaraphap 44 (Soi Saeng Sueksa) to the south, Khlong Ban Khamin to the east, and Phran Nok Market to the west. Traditional homes here were Thai wooden houses with gabled roofs and spacious grounds. Large open spaces were needed for casting and mold-making, while the remaining land was typically planted with fruit trees or vegetable gardens. A canal once ran through the community, linking directly to the Chao Phraya River near Wat Rakhang.

Later, due to the community's proximity to Siriraj Hospital and Wang Lang Market, accidents occasionally occurred when sparks from casting work ignited nearby houses. To prevent further fires, the government banned casting activities within residential areas. Today, those who continue the craft have relocated their foundries and shops along Phran Nok Road, near the Fai Chai Intersection.

== Geography ==
Ban Chang Lo covers the central-southern area of Bangkok Noi, with a total area of 2.076 km^{2} (round about 0.801 mi^{2}), regarded as the third largest subdistrict of Bangkok Noi (after Bang Khun Si and Arun Amarin).

The area is bordered by neighbouring subdistricts (from north clockwise): Bang Khun Si and Siriraj in its district (Charan Sanitwong Road, Southern Railway Line, Khlong Wat Thong and Sutthawat Road are the borderlines), Siriraj in its district (Itsaraphap Road, Wang Lang Road and Khlong Ban Khamin are the borderlines), Wat Arun and Wat Tha Phra of Bangkok Yai District (Khlong Mon is a borderline), Bang Khun Si in its district (Charan Sanitwong Road is a borderline).

Nowadays, the area opposite Wat Wiset Kan's gate with a blue sign indicating Ban Chang Lo Community installed on Wang Lang Road, which is an alley connects to Soi Itsaraphap 44 and leads to other communities and places such as Ban Khamin, Trok Matum (Soi Arun Amarin 23), Thonburi Hospital and Navy Park Club.
