= Ubonrak Thonburi Hospital =

Geography
- Location: Ubon Ratchathani, Thailand
- Coordinates: 15.231371°N 104.871089°E

Organisation
- Care system: Private
- Type: General and Specialized

Services
- Standards: HA, AACI
- Beds: 100 Inpatient Beds

History
- Founded: 1995; 31 years ago

Links
- Website: http://www.ubonrak.com/
- Lists: Hospitals in Thailand

Ubonrak Thonburi (Thai: โรงพยาบาลอุบลรักษ์ ธนบุรี) is a private hospital in Ubon Ratchathani province, Thailand. It is an associate company of the Thonburi Healthcare Group (THG), a healthcare network comprosing more than 20 hospitals nationwide.

== History ==
The hospital was established in 1991 and officially opened on 10 May 1995. It is owned by Ubonrak Company Limited, operates with approximately 100 inpatient beds and employs around 500 staff. The faciliteis are located on about 15 rai of land in central Ubon Ratchathani.

== Services ==
The Hospital provides tertiary care serives to local and international patients, including those from neighboring countries in the Greater Makong Subregion. It specialties include cardiology, neurology, oncology, orthopedics, maternal and child health, ophthalmology, otolaryngology (ENT), physical therapy, dialysis and minimally invasive surgery.

It maintains delivery rooms and a neonatal intensive care unit (NICU), and has general and specialized operating theatres to support surgical procedures.

== Facilities ==
Dianostic and treatment facilities include Magnetic resonance imaging (MRI), Computed tomography (CT), Dual-energy X-ray absorptiometry (DEXA), Digital mammography, Cardiac catheterization laboratory (Cath Lab), Colposcopy for cervical screening and High-magnification operating microscopes.

The hospital has also installed a linear accelerator (LINAC) and a CT simulator (CT-SIM) for radiotherapy, scheduled to begin operating in 2026.

== Organization Statements ==
According to the hospital, its stated vision is to develop as a leading tertiary private hospital with modern standards and a focus on sustainability in both environmental and social dimensions.

It has also adopted the motto "Service by heart, care as our facmily.

== See also ==
- List of hospitals in Thailand
- International healthcare accreditation
- Medical tourism
- Asian Hospital and Medical Center
