= Saphan Hok =

Saphan Hok สะพานหก
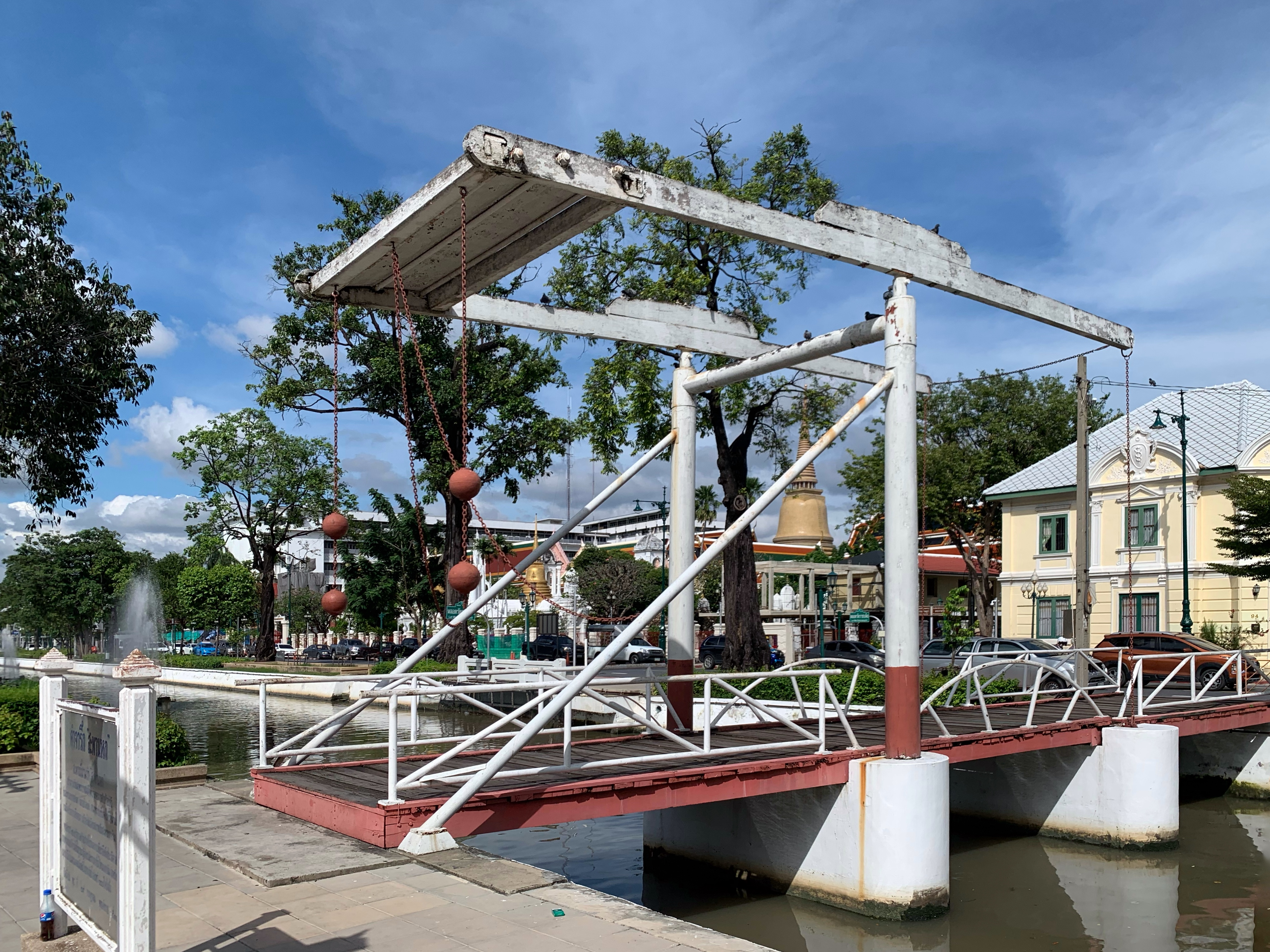
- Coordinates: 13°44′53.81″N 100°29′46.56″E
- Crosses: Khlong Khu Mueang Doem (Khlong Lot)
- Locale: Phra Borom Maha Ratchawang and Wang Burapha Phirom Sub-Districts, Phra Nakhon District, Bangkok, Thailand
- Other name: Lifting Bridge
- Maintained by: Bangkok Metropolitan Administration (BMA)

Location
- Interactive map of Saphan Hok

Saphan Hok (Thai: สะพานหก, pronounced [sā.pʰāːn hòk]) is a bridge over the old city moat, or Khlong Khu Mueang Doem, in Bangkok's Phra Borom Maha Ratchawang and Wang Burapha Phirom sub-districts, Phra Nakhon District, with its west end directly in front of the entrance to Saranrom Park.

The name Saphan Hok translates as "tipping bridge", a type of drawbridge that can be lifted to allow boats to pass. The original was a wooden structure modeled after similar bridges in the Netherlands. In the early Rattanakosin period, there were eight such bridges in Bangkok, both on the Phra Nakhon (Bangkok core) and Thonburi sides. Today, only this one remains.

During the reign of King Chulalongkorn (Rama V), the bridge was replaced with a reinforced concrete structure to accommodate trams. Its base was modified to include steps, a design that still remains.

In 1982, to mark the 200th anniversary of the Rattanakosin era, Saphan Hok was restored as a pedestrian bridge. The reconstruction was based on photographic documentation from the period.

== See also ==
- Saphan Han
