= Cultural heritage conservation in Thailand =

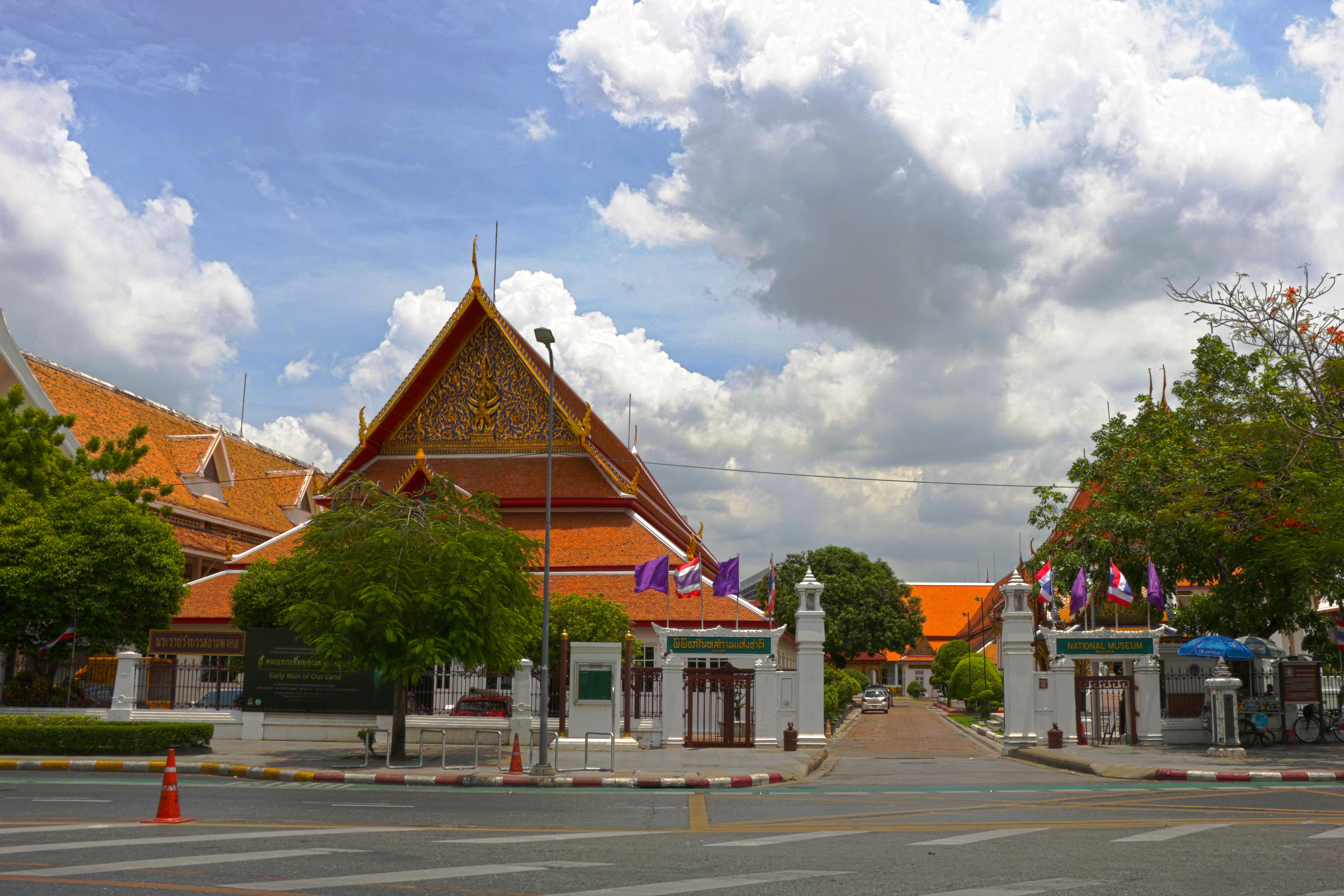
National Museum in Bangkok, Thailand (2016)

The conservation and management of Thailand's cultural heritage falls largely under the purview of the Fine Arts Department, under the framework of the Act on Ancient Monuments, Antiques, Objects of Art and National Museums, B.E. 2504 (1961). Under the law, the department has authority to manage and protect architectural sites (referred to as "ancient monuments" (Thai: โบราณสถาน, RTGS: borannasathan)), antiques (โบราณวัตถุ, borannawatthu) and objets d'art (ศิลปวัตถุ, sinlapawatthu) of significant artistic, historical, or archaeological value. It is also responsible for operating national museums for the safekeeping of such artefacts. As of September 2015, the Department lists 5,678 ancient monuments, 2,087 of which have officially been registered (including 10 historical parks). It operates 43 national museums throughout the country.

Other institutions are also involved in the field, including universities, professional organizations, and public and private museums. Thailand signed the World Heritage Convention in 1987, and is home to three cultural World Heritage Sites: Ban Chiang Archaeological Site, the Historic City of Ayutthaya, and the Historic Town of Sukhothai and Associated Historic Towns.

The conservation of heritage sites is often a contentious issue in Thailand, especially in cases involving private or religious property. Issues include looting, conflicting values between conservators and locals, lack of expertise, and lack of incentives for private owners to cooperate with conservation efforts. Lately, efforts to increase local involvement have resulted in several successful programmes.
