= Phra Borom Maha Ratchawang subdistrict =

Coordinates: 13°45′29.8″N 100°29′37.2″E

Phra Borom Maha Ratchawang พระบรมมหาราชวัง
- Khwaeng
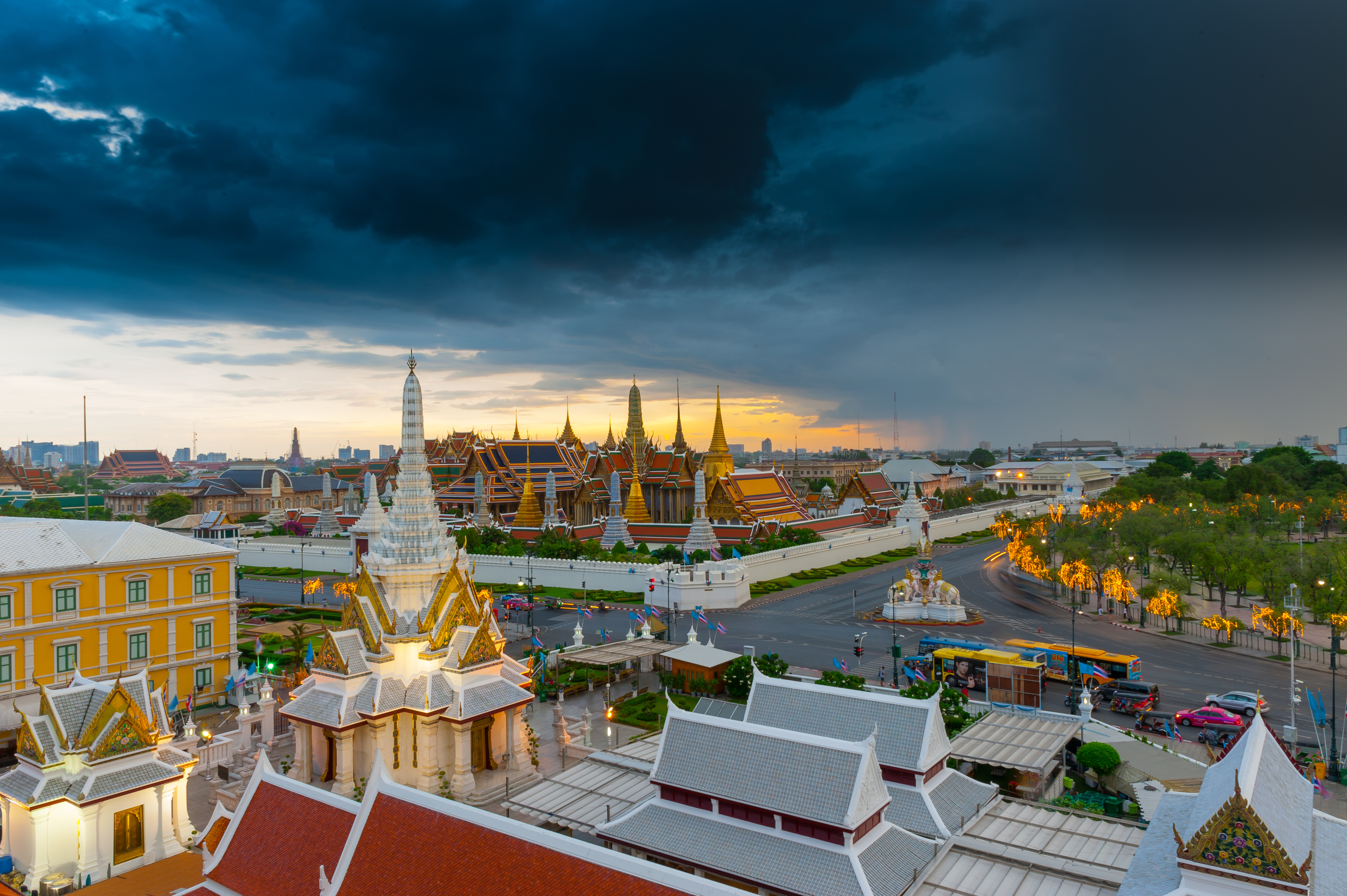
- Grand Palace, the official residence of the King of Siam (and later Thailand) since 1782

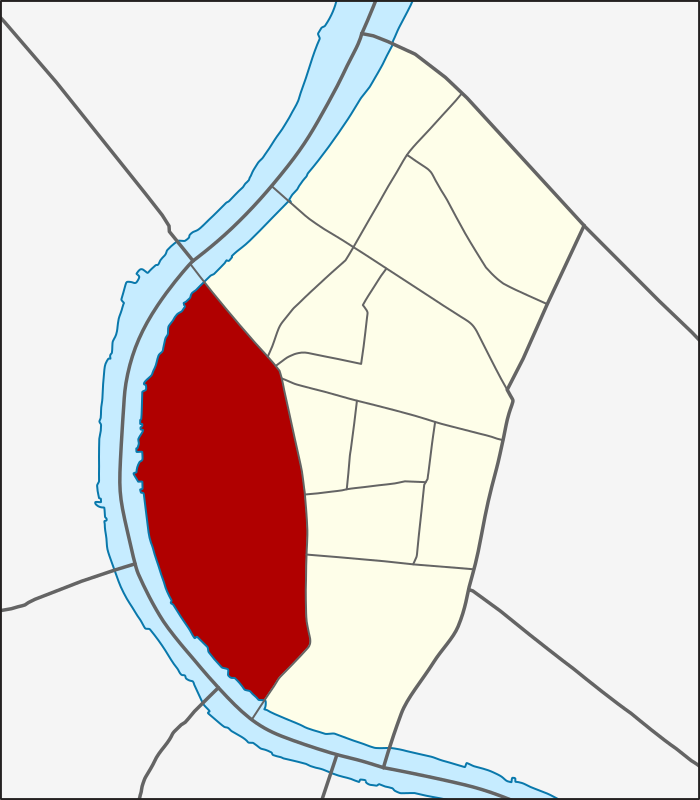
- Location in Phra Nakhon District
- Country: Thailand
- Province: Bangkok
- Khet: Phra Nakhon

Area
  - Total: 1.647 km^{2} (0.636 sq mi)

Population (2017)
  - Total: 3,953
  - Density: 1,224.65/km^{2} (3,171.8/sq mi)
- Time zone: UTC+7 (ICT)
- Postal code: 10200
- TIS 1099: 100101

Phra Borom Maha Ratchawang (Thai: พระบรมมหาราชวัง, pronounced [pʰráʔ bɔ̄ː.rōm mā.hǎː râːt.tɕʰā.wāŋ]) is a khwaeng (subdistrict) of Phra Nakhon District, in Bangkok, Thailand. In 2017 it had a total population of 3,953 people. The subdistrict was named after the Grand Palace or Phra Borom Maha Ratchawang in Thai, which is located within the subdistrict.

The subdistrict is the home of Wang Tha Phra Campus of Silpakorn University.

== History ==
When Somdet Chaophraya Maha Kasatsuek established himself as a King Rama I, after the death of King Taksin, he moved the capital of Siam (now Thailand) to the right side of Chao Phraya River opposite to the former capital, Thonburi. He then built a new palace along with the establishment of the Rattanakosin Kingdom officially on April 21, 1782.

== Geography ==
Phra Borom Maha Ratchawang can be considered a western part of the district and the main administrative area of the district.

The area is bordered by many subdistricts (from north clockwise): Chana Songkhram, Talat Yot, Bowon Niwet, San Chaopho Suea, Wat Ratchabophit, Wang Burapha Phirom all in its district, and Wat Kanlaya in Thon Buri District, Wat Arun in Bangkok Yai District, Siriraj, and Arun Amarin in Bangkok Noi District (across Chao Phraya River).
