= Rattanakosin Island =

Historic area of the Phra Nakhon District of Bangkok, Thailand

Coordinates: 13°45′N 100°30′E

Rattanakosin Island is the area to the west and south of Khlong Ong Ang and Khlong Bang Lamphu.

Rattanakosin Island (Thai: เกาะรัตนโกสินทร์, RTGS: Ko Rattanakosin, pronounced [kɔ̀ʔ rát.tà.ná(ʔ).kōː.sǐn]) is a historic area in the Phra Nakhon District in the city of Bangkok, Thailand. It is bordered by the Chao Phraya River to the west and multiple canals to the east that were dug to serve as moats for what was originally the fortified city center. Situated on the eastern convex bank of a meander in the Chao Phraya River, the island is the site of the Grand Palace and Bangkok's City Pillar Shrine, among other places of historical significance.

== History ==
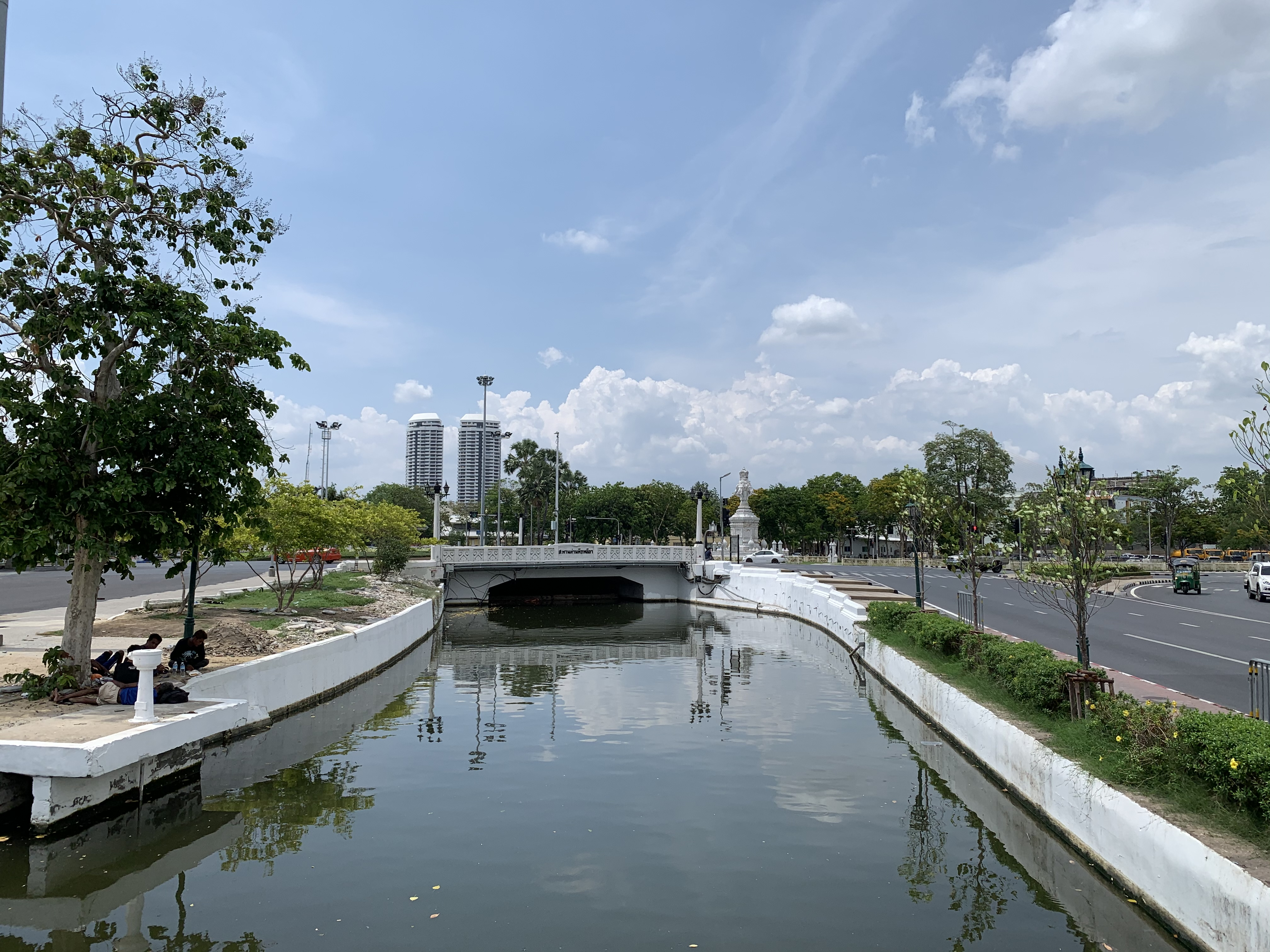
Khlong Khu Mueang Doem Canal, seeing the Phan Phiphop Lila Bridge in the vicinity, 2021

King Phutthayotfa Chulalok (Rama I) founded the city as the capital of his new Rattanakosin Kingdom in 1782.

Before Bangkok became the capital of Thailand, the capital city was Thonburi. The old city straddled the Chao Phraya, but was mainly settled on the western bank where the royal palace and other institutions were situated. The eastern bank was mostly home to Chinese and Vietnamese (forced) settlers.

When Phutthayotfa Chulalok established himself as king, he re-established the capital on the eastern bank, relocating the prior settlers to the area between Wat Sam Pluem and Wat Sampheng. (The area is now Bangkok's Chinatown.) Fortifications were ordered to be rebuilt, and canals extended to form moats around the fortified city. The inner moat, created by connecting Rong Mai Canal and Talat Canal, is now known as Khlong Khu Mueang Doem (lit. old city moat canal).

Khlong Rop Krung (canal encircling city) was merged from Bang Lamphu and Ong Ang canals. The area enclosed by Khlong Khu Mueang Doem and the river is referred to as Inner Rattanakosin, while Outer Rattanakosin refers to the originally less developed area between the two canals. Two further small canals known as Khlong Lot (tube/straw canal) connect the inner and outer moats.

== See also ==
- History of Bangkok
- Fortifications of Bangkok
- Thonburi City Moat
