= Sanam Chai Road =

Street in Bangkok, Thailand

Coordinates: 13°44′52″N 100°29′39″E

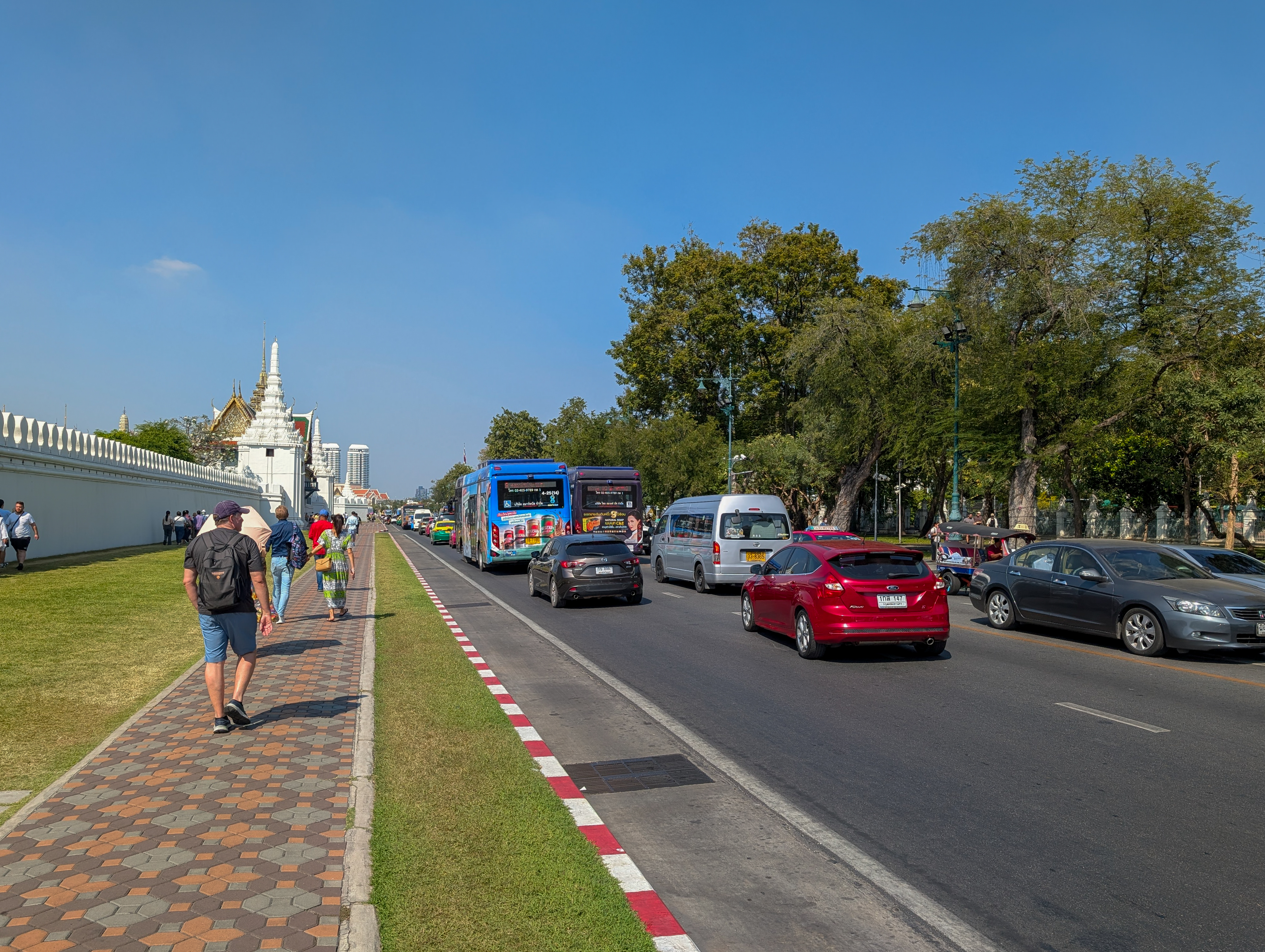
Sanam Chai road outside of the Grand Palace.

Sanam Chai Road (Thai: ถนนสนามไชย, RTGS: Thanon Sanam Chai, pronounced [tʰā.nǒn sā.nǎːm t͡ɕʰāj]) is a historic street in Bangkok's Phra Nakhon District. It continues from Ratchadamnoen Nai Road at the northeastern corner of the Grand Palace, and runs south to meet Rachini and Maharat roads near the mouth of the old city moat, a short distance of 1.1 kilometres (0.68 mi). The Grand Palace, Wat Pho, Museum Siam, and Phra Ratchawang Police Station are located on the west side of the road, while on the east side are the Ministry of Defence headquarters, Saranrom Palace, Saranrom Park, the Territorial Defense Command headquarters and Wat Rajabopit School. The Sanam Chai Station of the underground MRT's Blue Line is located beneath the road's final stretch.

The road is named after Sanam Chai ("field of prosperity"), a field formerly located in front of Saranrom Palace and used for military exercises. The field, together with Sanam Luang, was named by King Mongkut (Rama IV) in 1855, in order to follow the naming previously used in Ayutthaya. Sanam Chai is overlooked by the Grand Palace's Sutthaisawan Prasat Hall, which is used by the king for public appearances.

In terms of politics, Sanam Chai Road during the 1960s and 1970s was often used as a keynote address for various political parties in each election. Most often start the campaign at Sanam Luang and ends at Sanam Chai.
