= Saranrom Park =

Park in Bangkok, Thailand

Coordinates: 13°44′54″N 100°29′42″E

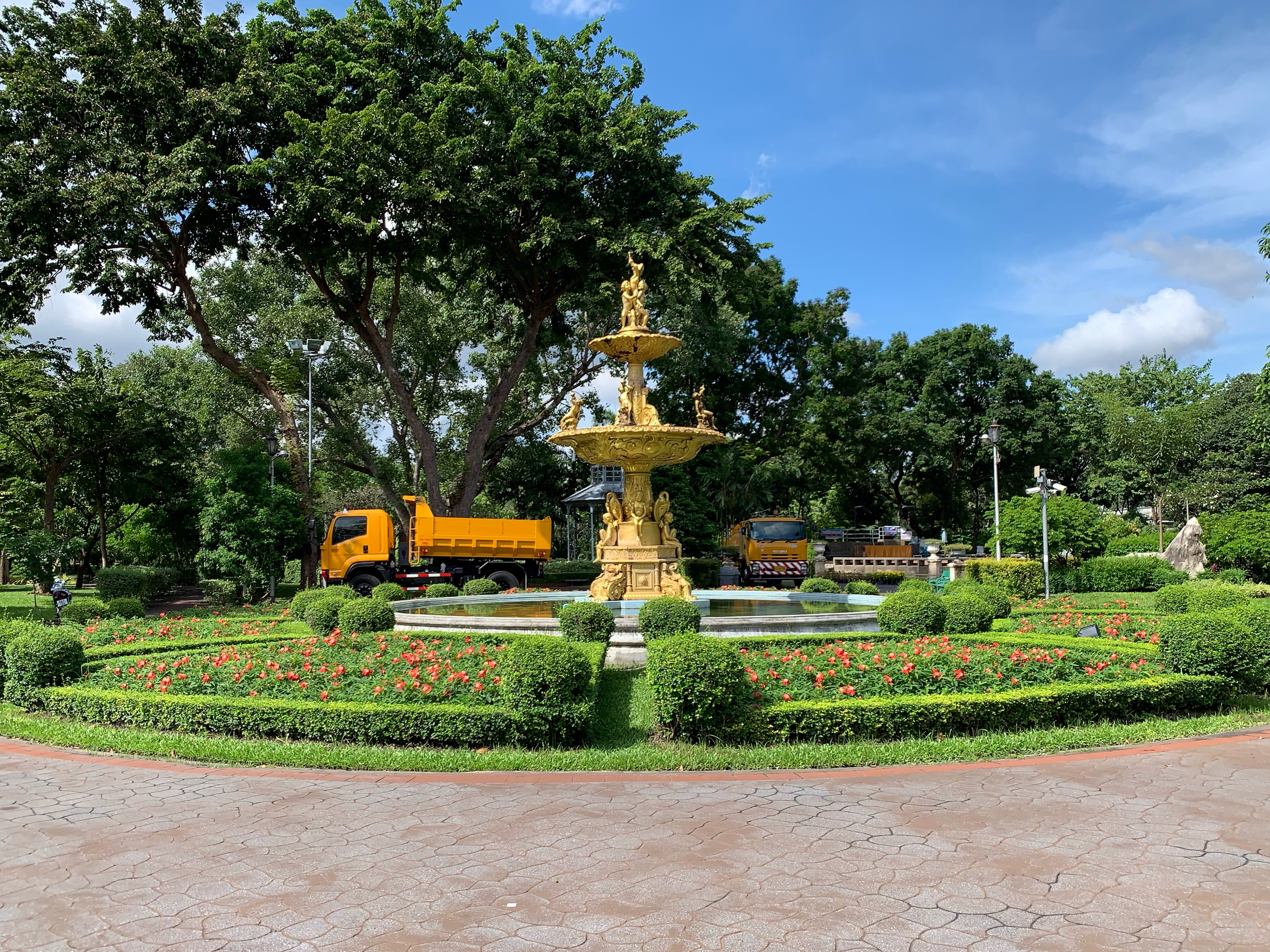
Bronze fountain in Saranrom Park

Saranrom Park (Thai: สวนสราญรมย์, RTGS: Suan Saran Rom, pronounced [sǔan sā.rāːn rōm]) is a public park in Bangkok. It is located opposite the Grand Palace, between Sanam Chai, Charoen Krung and Rachini roads in Phra Borom Maha Ratchawang Subdistrict, Phra Nakhon District. The park occupies the former grounds of Saranrom Palace, which was built in 1866 and served as the residences of several princes and royal guests. The palace gardens were converted to serve as a public park under the Bangkok Metropolitan Administration in 1960.

== History ==
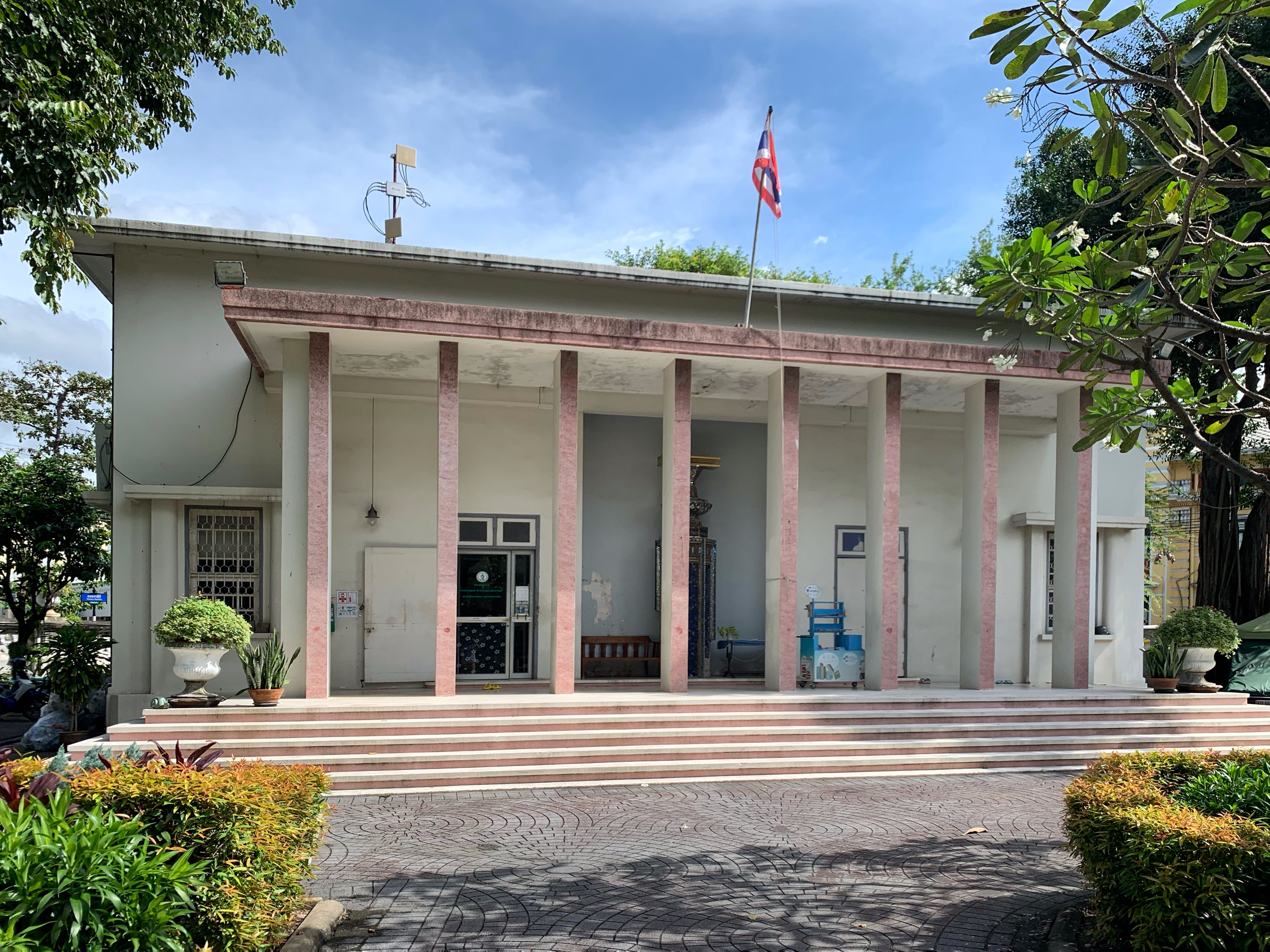
Khana Ratsadon's Club at Saranrom, now the park's office

In the past Saranrom Park was the part of Saranrom Palace which was established in 1874 by King Chulalongkorn (RamaV) on the advice of Henry Alabaster who desired this park to be similar to other country. It was decorated by fountains, garden flowers, orchids, perennial plant especially “red roses” which were a favorite flowers of Rama V and there are bird cages and animal cages in the park at that moment. Later in 1904, King Vajiravudh (Rama VI) used this park to train military skills to royal guard and was center place for tradition and culture. This place held “winter events” once during Rama VI reign and in 1932 King Prajadhipok (Rama VII) gave this place to be a location of Khana Ratsadon's office where a constitution celebration was held annually on 10 December. Siam's first annual national beauty pageant Miss Siam (later Miss Thailand) was also held as a part of the yearly celebration. Later in 3 June 1960 this park was donated by government to Bangkok to be a public place for people in Bangkok.

== Points of Interest ==
=== Queen Sunanda Kumariratana Memorial ===
The memorial was built in 1886, surrounded with lanthom shrubs. It was built on the spot that was claimed to be favoured by Queen Sunanda Kumariratana when she visited, then, the garden. The memorial was built with white marble in the manner of phra prang with her ashes included on the top. All four sides of the memorial are inscription slabs detailing the grievances of her husband, the King Chulalongkorn. Three of them are scripted in Thai and one in English. Crown Prince Vajirunhis ceremonially opened the monument on 28 June 1886.

=== People’s Party Society Building ===
People's Party Society (Khana Ratsadon's Club at Saranrom; สโมสรคณะราษฎร์สราญรมย์) was the office of a political organisation, People's Party which after successfully led the Siamese revolution of 1932 had turned into a political club. The one-storied building was built in Khana Ratsadon's Architecture. At the entrance lied a mirror-decorated sculpture depicting the Constitution of Thailand on a phan, the symbol of newly incepted constitution which Khana Ratsadon attempted to popularise at the time. During the party's occupation, the park was used as the venue for the annual Constitution Celebration on December 10. The building now houses the park's office.

=== Greenhouse ===
The Greenhouse, despite being built as a Victorian-style greenhouse, it was not used for botanical purposes. Indeed, it was the location of Thawi Panya Club (สโมสรทวีปัญญา) which was the meeting place for Siamese elites to mix and mingle, play cards, read books, and act in plays. The building now lies in disrepair and being use as the park's storage facility.

=== Chao Mae Takhian Thong Shrine ===
San Chao Mae Takhian Thong: There was no account on when the shrine was incepted. It was rebuilt in the 1910s as a three-storied Chinese Pagoda. The shrine houses the spirit of Chao Mae Takhian Thong in the Hopea odorata log located in the pagoda.

== Nearby places ==
Saranrom Park is located near temples and palaces for example, Wat Pho which is popular place for tourists, Wat Ratchapradit and Saranrom Palace

== Social issue ==
During nighttime til dawn of new day the neighbouring around Saranrom Park such as Sanam Luang, Atsadang Road, Saphan Mon, are the sources of male prostitutes. They were often young boys, dressed in different outfits such as military or sportswear.

== Gallery ==
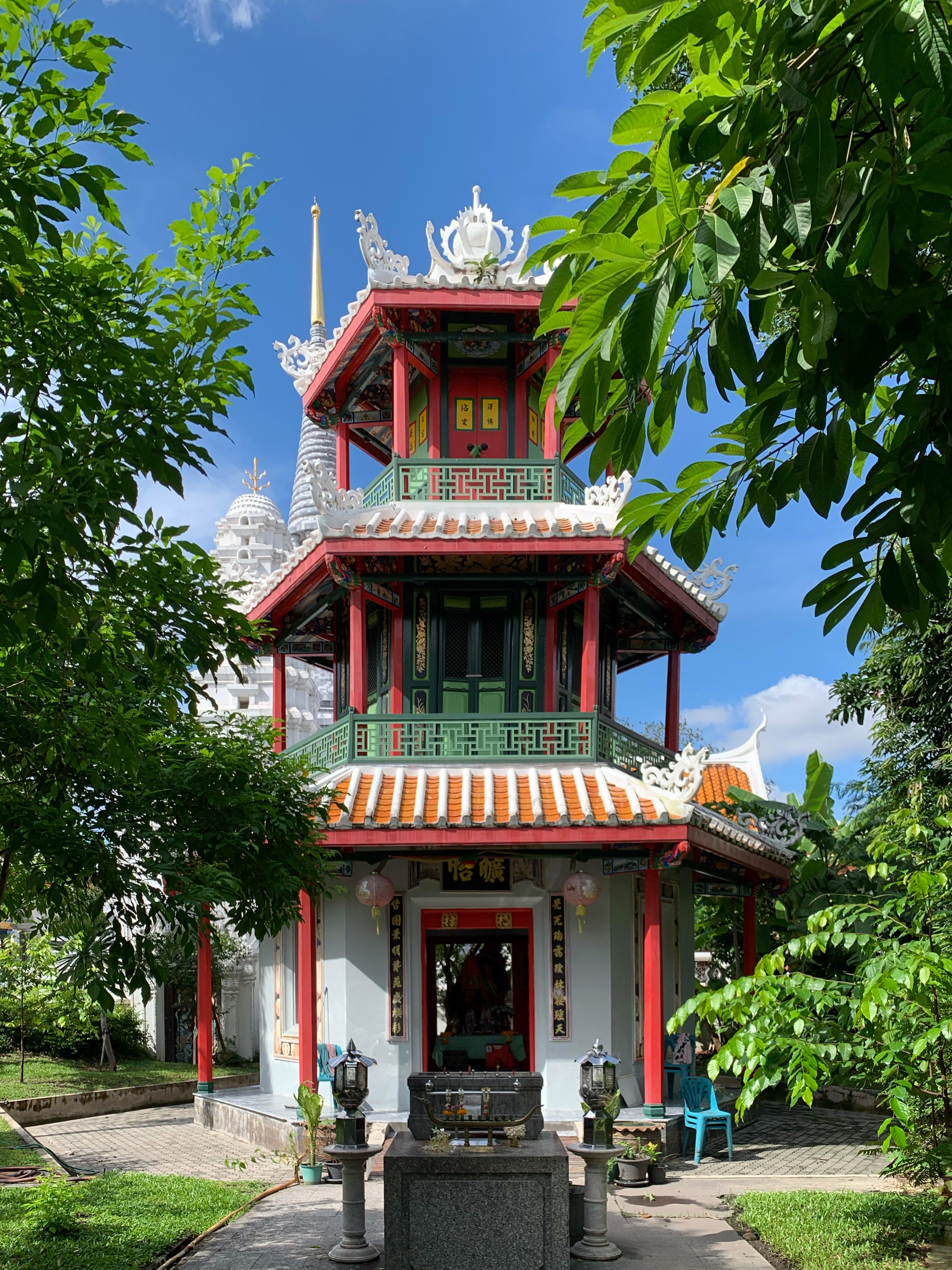
Chao Mae Takhian Thong Srhine, built in Chinese pagoda style

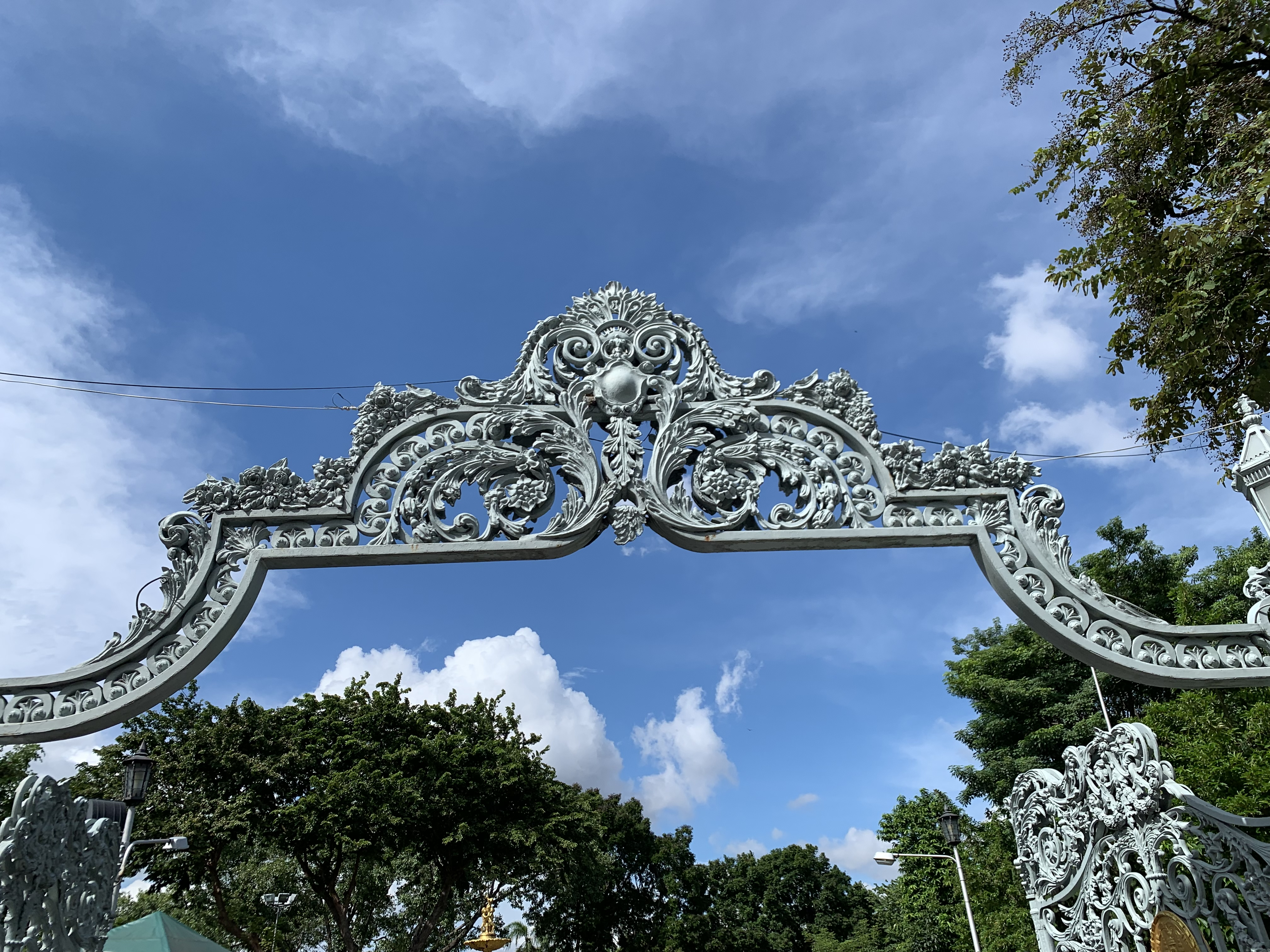
The cast-iron gate of the park

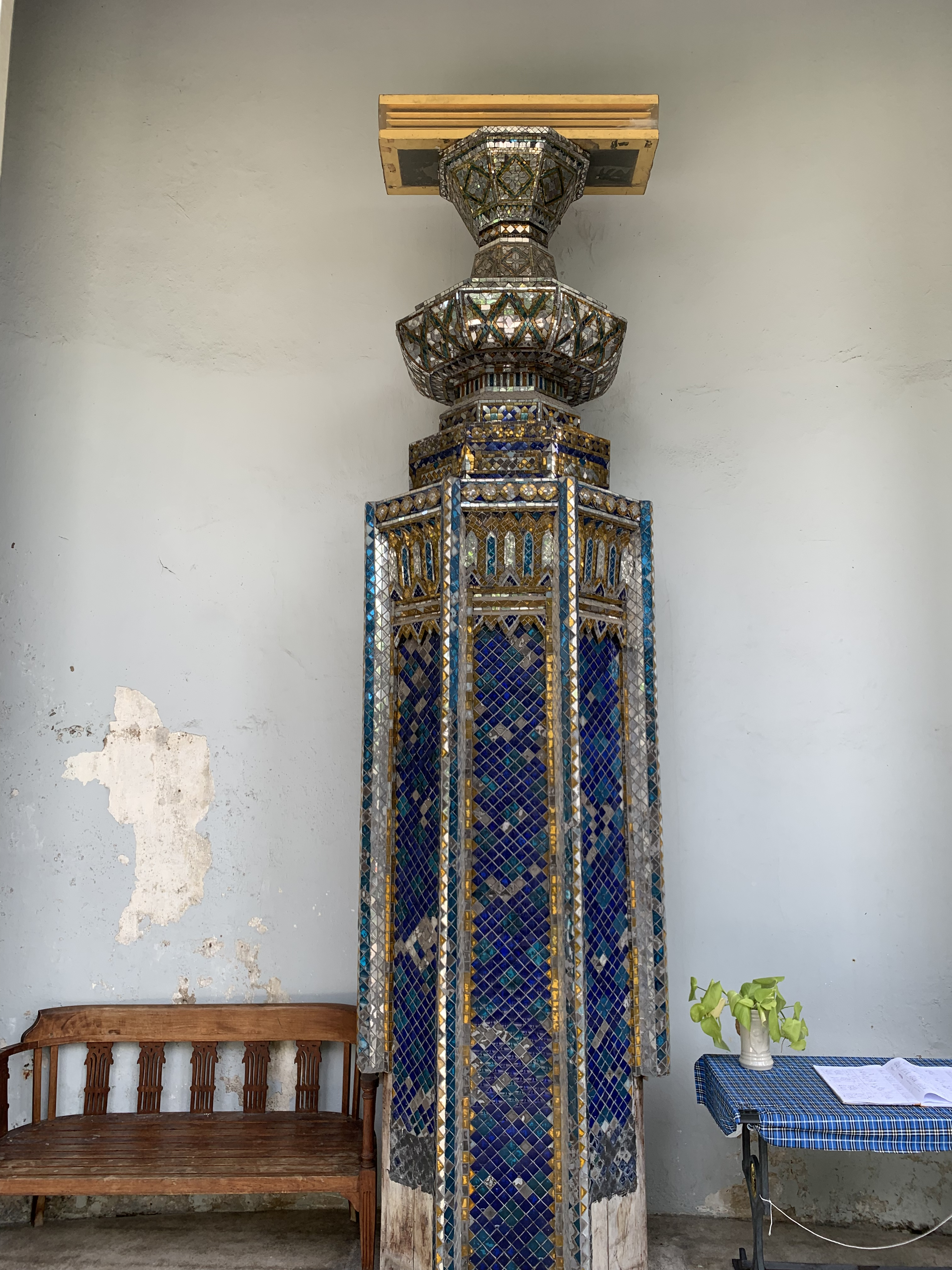
Sculpture of the Constitution on the Phan at the Khana Ratsadon's Club at Saranrom

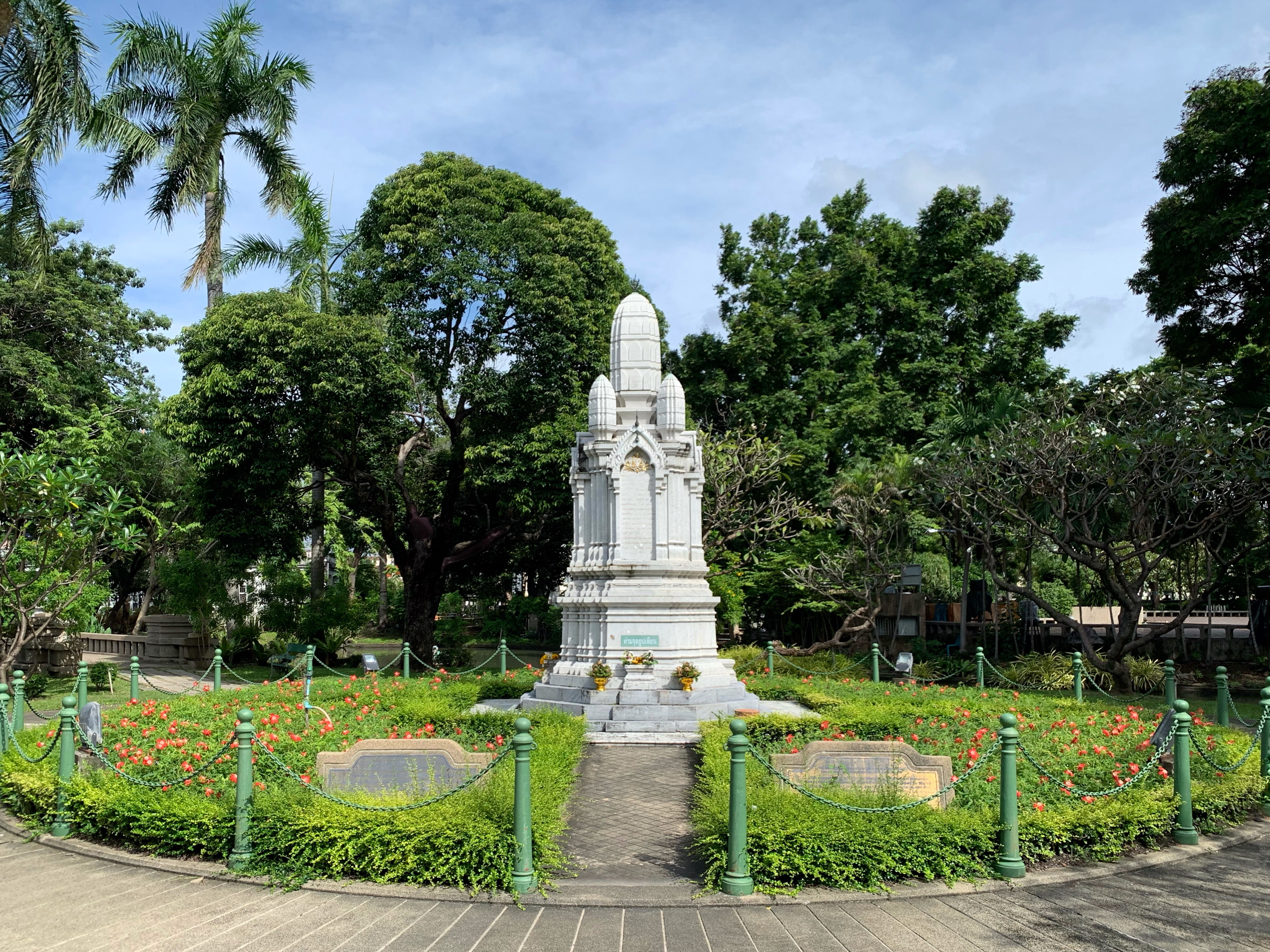
Queen Sunanda Kumariratana Memorial in Saranrom Park

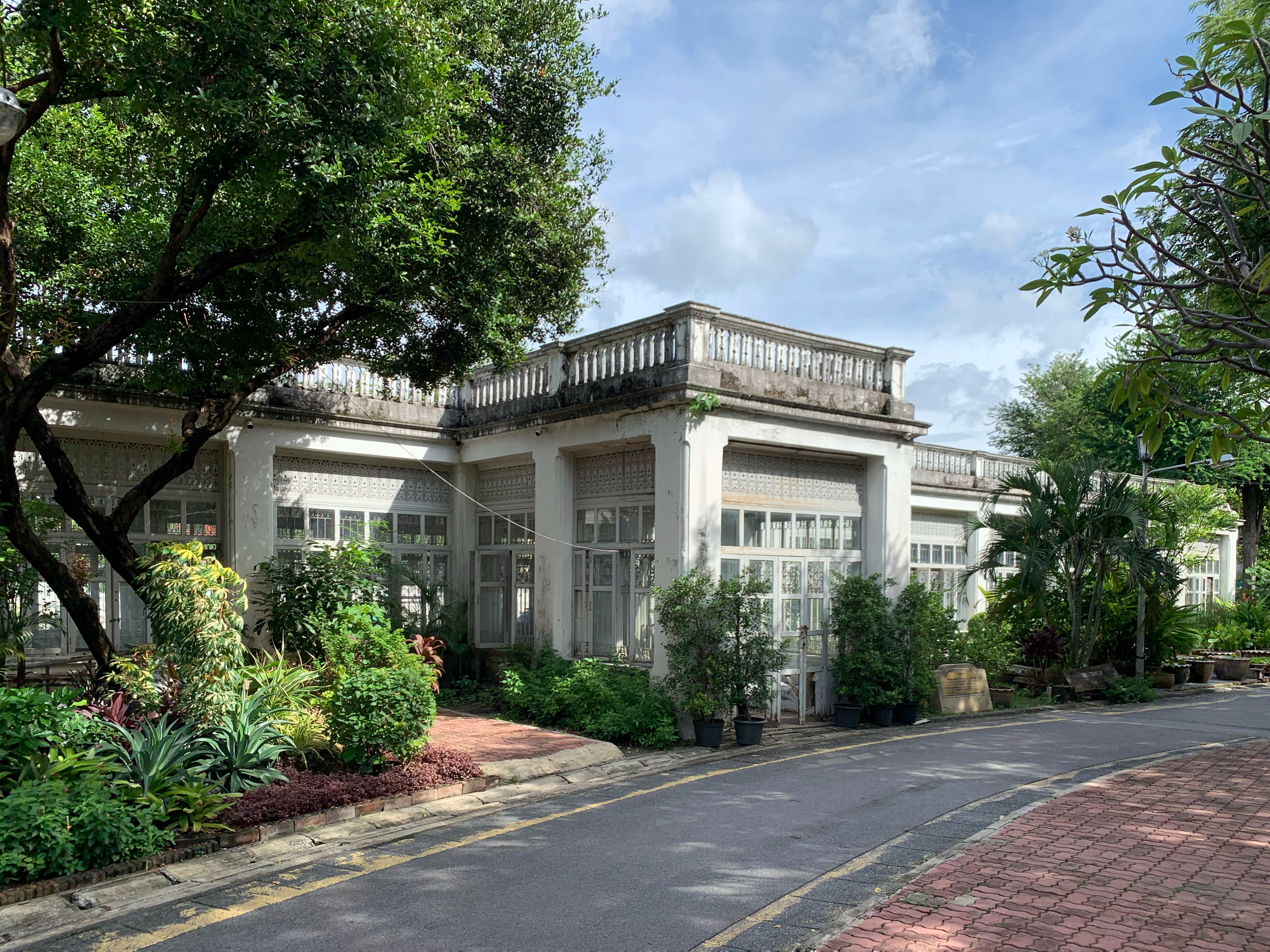
The greenhouse, formerly Thawi Panya Club

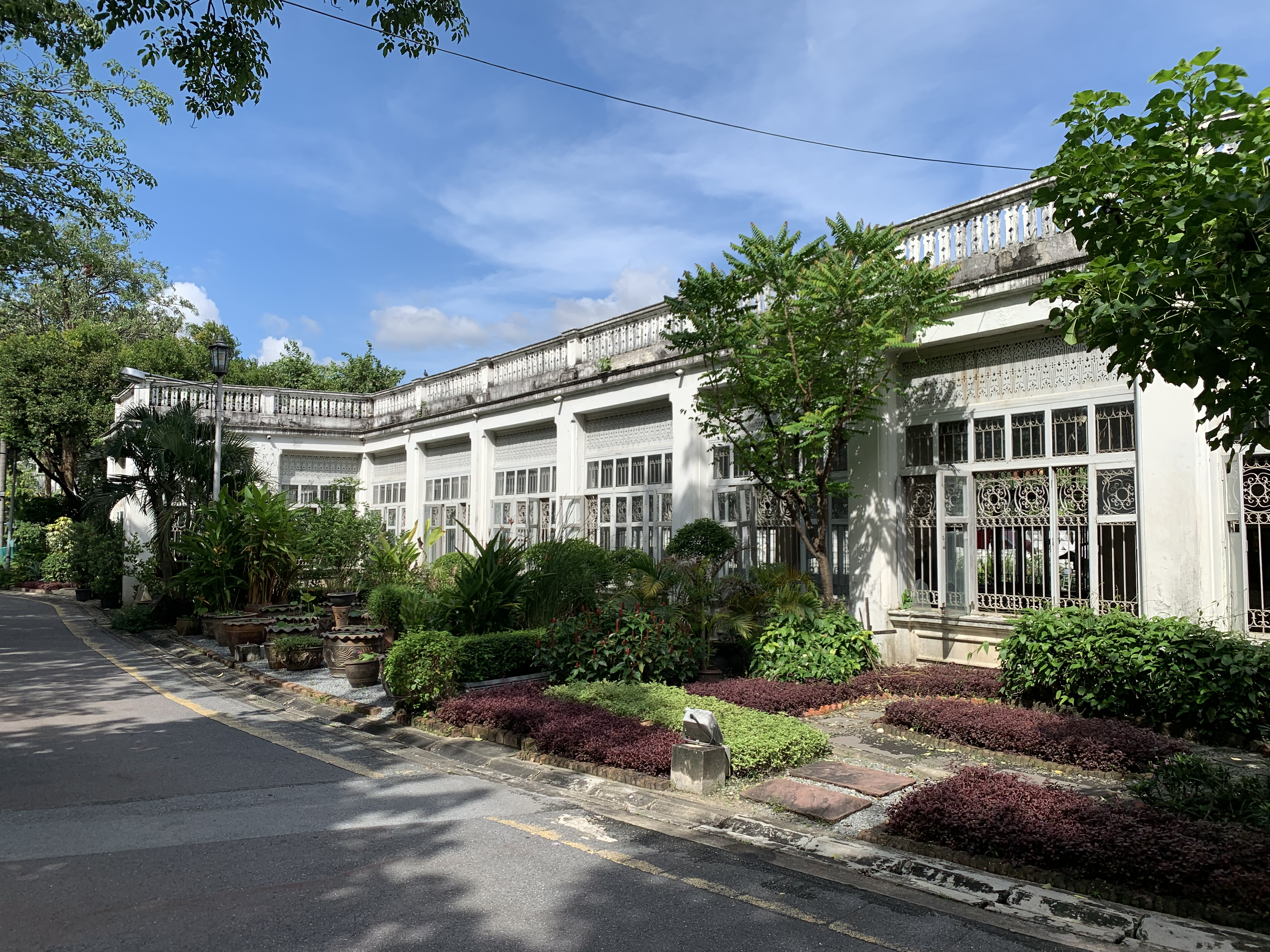
The greenhouse, formerly Thawi Panya Club
