= Museum Siam =

- มิวเซียมสยาม
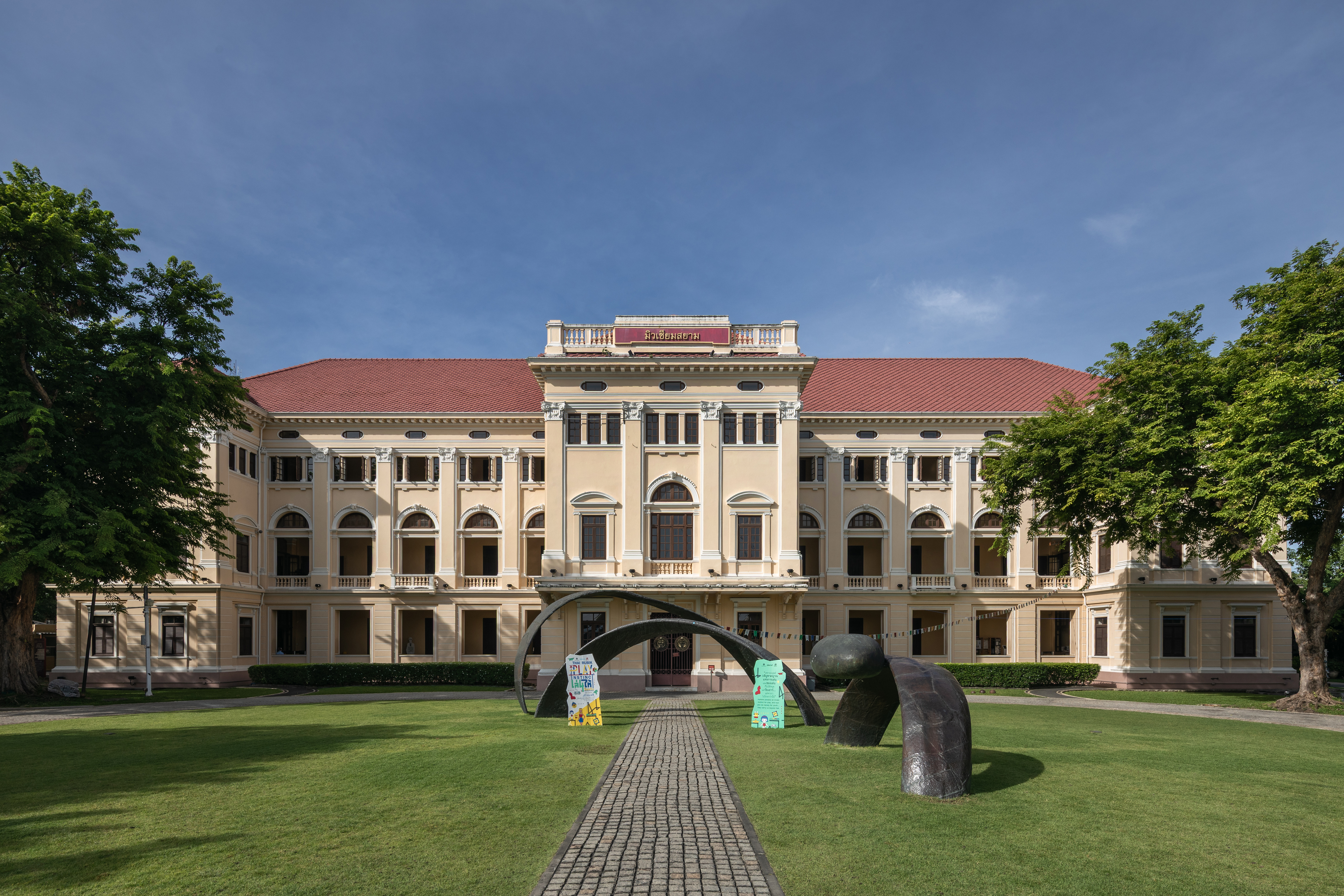
- Museum Siam in 2025
- Established: 2 April 2007
- Location: Sanam Chai Road, Phra Borom Maha Ratchawang Subdistrict, Phra Nakhon District, Bangkok
- Coordinates: 13.7441°N 100.4941°E
- Type: Discovery museum
- Website: Official website

Museum Siam (Thai: มิวเซียมสยาม) is a discovery museum that is located at Sanam Chai road in Bangkok, Thailand. The museum was established in 2007 in the former building of the Ministry of Commerce. It was created to teach the national identity and history of the people of Thailand, and their relationships with neighboring cultures. The motto of the museum is “Play + Learn = เพลิน” (which means 'joyously' in Thai); through a series of interactive exhibits, the museum shows the development of Thailand from the past to present.

== History ==
The Ministry of Commerce building was completed in 1922. The building was designed to prevent fire, including ventilation of heat and air. The building was made of concrete and follows the industrial building systems that Tamagno and his team often applied during the reign of King Rama VI.

The Ministry of Commerce building, constructed over a century ago, initially served as the office for the Ministry. After a reorganization of government structure, it was passed changed to Ministry of Transport, but in 1972 it was again changed to Ministry of Commerce. But then in 1999 the Ministry of Commerce moved to a new building at Sanam Bun Nam Located at Bangkasor. Later in 2005 the building was officially registered by Fine Arts Department as one of the Thailand's heritage sites. Between 2005 and 2007 the National Discovery Museum Institute(NDMI) undertook a project to assess the building's condition, conduct archaeological excavations, and develop exhibition content and display designs. On December 23, 2007, Her Royal Highness Princess Maha Chakri Sirindhorn presided over the opening ceremony of the Museum Siam building, marking its official inauguration.

== Architecture ==
The museum building was originally built as the offices of the Ministry of Commerce during the reign of King Vajiravudh (Rama VI, 1910–1925). The land previously belonged to a palace which served as the residence of several sons of King Rama III. The building, in the classical revival style, was designed by Italian architect Mario Tamagno, in collaboration with engineer E.G. Gollo and another architect named Guadrelli, and with decorative elements by Vittorio Novi. Construction took place from 1921 to 1922. The building received the ASA Architectural Conservation Award in 2006, and is a registered ancient monument.

The Sanam Chai MRT station, which opened in 2020, is located directly in front of the museum.

=== Mario Tamagno’s contribution ===
Mario Tamagno, born in Turin, Italy, graduated from the Albertina Academy of Fine Arts in 1895. After graduation, he became an instructor at the academy while pursuing further education under Carlo Ceppiuntil 1899. Shortly after, when the Siamese Government sought to employ an Italian architect for building consultation, Tamagno was recommended by the Master Technician to accept the position.

In 1900, when Tamagno traveled to Siam, he entered into a 25-year contract with the Siamese government. He initially worked as an assistant architect for 3 years, after which he was promoted to chief architect in 1902 and later became superintendent architect. During the later years of King Chulalongkorn's reign (Rama V), Tamagno's architectural contributions included the Makkhawan Rangsan Bridge, Abhisek Dusit Throne Hall, Phan Fa Lilat Bridge, Bang Khun PhromPalace, Parusakavan Palace, Amphorn Sathan Villa, Oriental Hotel, The first office if Siam Commercial Bank, Bang Khun Phrom Palace the ceremonial arch for King Rama V's celebration at Niwat Phra Nakhon, Suriyanuwat Villa, Phra Mongkhon Bophit Temple, Waen Si Bridge, and Phyathai Palac. During the reign of King Vajiravudh (Rama VI), Tamagno's works included the Siam Pavilion at the Turin International World's Fair, Ananta Samakhom Throne Hall, the design of Phra Mongkhon Bophit Temple, and Rajathiwas Temple, in collaboration with Prince Naris.

=== Conservation of building ===
Commercial buildings are supported by the concept of "integrative thinking," aiming to maintain the value of the building by adjusting the structure of the new control system. The structure and the historical aspects of the building are continuously linked, both externally and internally. The creation, achieved by adjusting the elements of the theater system, is interpreted into a physical form to support and entertain those who may lack a framework for thinking. This approach will determine the balance of the dynamic organizational structure, which is valuable.

The inspection process focuses on restoring the original condition of the building, which was previously an office building. It is considered a representation of the first era of Siam, featuring a reinforced concrete structure that holds significance for building conservation. The process involves exploring data and evidence to evaluate the ability of the original system to function as intended and to restore the building accordingly.

This original consideration supports the inspection of the building's structure in various aspects, such as the remaining small patches of wall color in different rooms, the wooden floors, and the cooling system. The restoration process also considers elements such as the construction of the control floor, the herbal water pipe system, the wastewater treatment plant, and the original overflow tank at the front of the building. These need to be improved while restoring the original building materials and maintaining authenticity as much as possible.

The architect must balance the restoration and the building's design. This may affect the space but should respect the original techniques and construction methods to preserve the essence of the building. Discussions about the original building area should avoid altering features such as ceilings or permanent fixtures, instead allowing natural light to highlight some parts of the building.

== Exhibitions ==
"Decoding Thainess" features 14 exhibition zones that explore different aspects of Thai culture and its evolution over time. Spanning history, architecture, traditions, cuisine, and clothing, the exhibition effectively incorporates cutting- edge technology and creative storytelling methods designed for contemporary audiences and their media preferences. It seeks to engage visitors by encouraging thoughtful reflection and providing interactive experiences, ensuring they are fully immersed and captivated throughout the entire exhibition.

The Accounts of Thailand is a permanent exhibition that explains the long history of Thailand. Visitors can learn about the mystery of the age of Suvarnabhumi and the factors that contributed to the golden age of Siam that led to the present-day Thailand in the “Decoding Thainess” exhibition and find the meaning of Thainess.

- Thai room translated into Thai

An exhibition room filled with display cabinets and drawers containing exhibits, presenting issues of Thainess in each era, allowing visitors to learn and search for “Thainess” in those objects that affect the identity of Thainess in the

- Thai Room from Birth

Showing the development of Thainess, presenting historical events and Thainess exhibits from 9 eras through hydraulic module technology, narration, and graphics, which are being used in an exhibition for the first time in Thailand.

- Thai Institution Room

Presents the core concepts of nation, religion, and monarchy, the three main institutions that reflect the expression of Thainess through AR technolog. It is designed like a jigsaw puzzle game where viewers can assemble the cube on a table in the middle of the room and images related to the issues of nation, religion, and monarchy will appear on the display.

- Thai Alangkarn Room

The interior simulates the atmosphere of the royal audience hall and the throne hall to show the aesthetics, beauty of Thai architecture and handicrafts, as well as reflecting the meaning, faith, Hinduism and Buddhist beliefs towards the monarchy, which is the center of the people.

- How is Thai Room

It presents Thainess through clothing and costumes. It is displayed with mannequins of clothing related to Thainess in various forms, arranged on aspiral base from high to low to show the status and intensity of Thainess.

- Thai Only Room

A room that gathers together familiar household items that we see in everyday life, which when seen we can immediately tell for sure are definitely Thai, such as condiment bundles, coffee bags tied with rubber bands, crocheted brand name bag handles, Mama noodles of various flavors, including the highlight, Khun Eabsap, a giant NangKwak statue that is over 4 meters tall, etc., which reflects the personality of Thai people who are inventive and improve in order to solve problems in life.

- Thai Inter Room

Presents different perspectives on Thainess in the eyes of Thais and foreigners, such as the Suphannahong boat paired with a long-tail boat, carved fruit paired with fruit carts, and royal cuisine paired with traditional Thai cuisine, reflecting the perspective of Thainess that we want other people to see and what other people think of us as.

- Thai Science Room

The interior simulates the atmosphere of classrooms from 4 eras: the beginning of democracy, Thainess in the 1950s, Thainess in the globalization era, and Thainess in the sufficiency era, which reflects the differences in economics, politics, and societythat are inserted through education, textbooks, and songs from each era.

- Thai Chim Room

A living kitchen that takes you to learn about the origins of famous Thai dishes such as Tom Yum Goong, Som Tam, Pad Thai, etc., using QR scanning technology with colorful motion graphics, including plate-shaped pamphlets that insert interesting facts about those dishes. A graphic board invites you to ask questions about Thai dishes with foreign names such as Khanom Jeen, American fried rice, and Tokyo dessert, etc.

- Thai Dee Kot Room

Presents the development of Thainess that has been influenced by other cultures, such as the prang of Wat Arun, the best of architecture, Thai letters,tuk-tuk, etc., through a presentation format with images that viewers can easily understand, such as 3D laser cuts, Zoetrope, Flipbook, etc.

- Thai believe Room

A room that collects over 108 objects of belief in Thailand, covering beliefs in ghosts, Buddhism, Brahmanism, and Thai beliefs that can be commonly found, which influence the way of life, along with belief workshops that you can actually try out, such as fortune telling, various forms of gambling* Thai Traditions : An exhibition room in the form of a warehouse presents stories about traditions, festivals and manners that clearly reflect Thainess. They are placed in boxes. Inside are documents explaining the origins of the stories, real illustrations that can be touched and played with, and games that make understanding the stories even more fun.

- Thai Chae Room

A photography studio presents the importance of photography as evidence that shows Thainess and allows us to know people and houses in different eras most clearly. Viewers can choose outfits, accessories, scenes and props to take photos to record memories as they wish.

Museum Siam has launched a new permanent exhibition titled "Decoding Thainess," designed to educate visitors about the evolution of Thai identity from past to present. This exhibition features 14 zones that explore various dimensions of Thainess, including historical, architectural, culinary, and traditional aspects. Utilizing advanced technology and innovative storytelling methods, the exhibition caters to modern audiences and encourages active participation. Visitors can engage with interactive displays, such as motion graphics in the "living kitchen" that showcases Thai cuisine, and a virtual classroom reflecting historical educational contexts.
