= Phra Ratchawang Police Station =

1915 Public building inn Thailand

Coordinates: 13°44′35″N 100°29′31″E

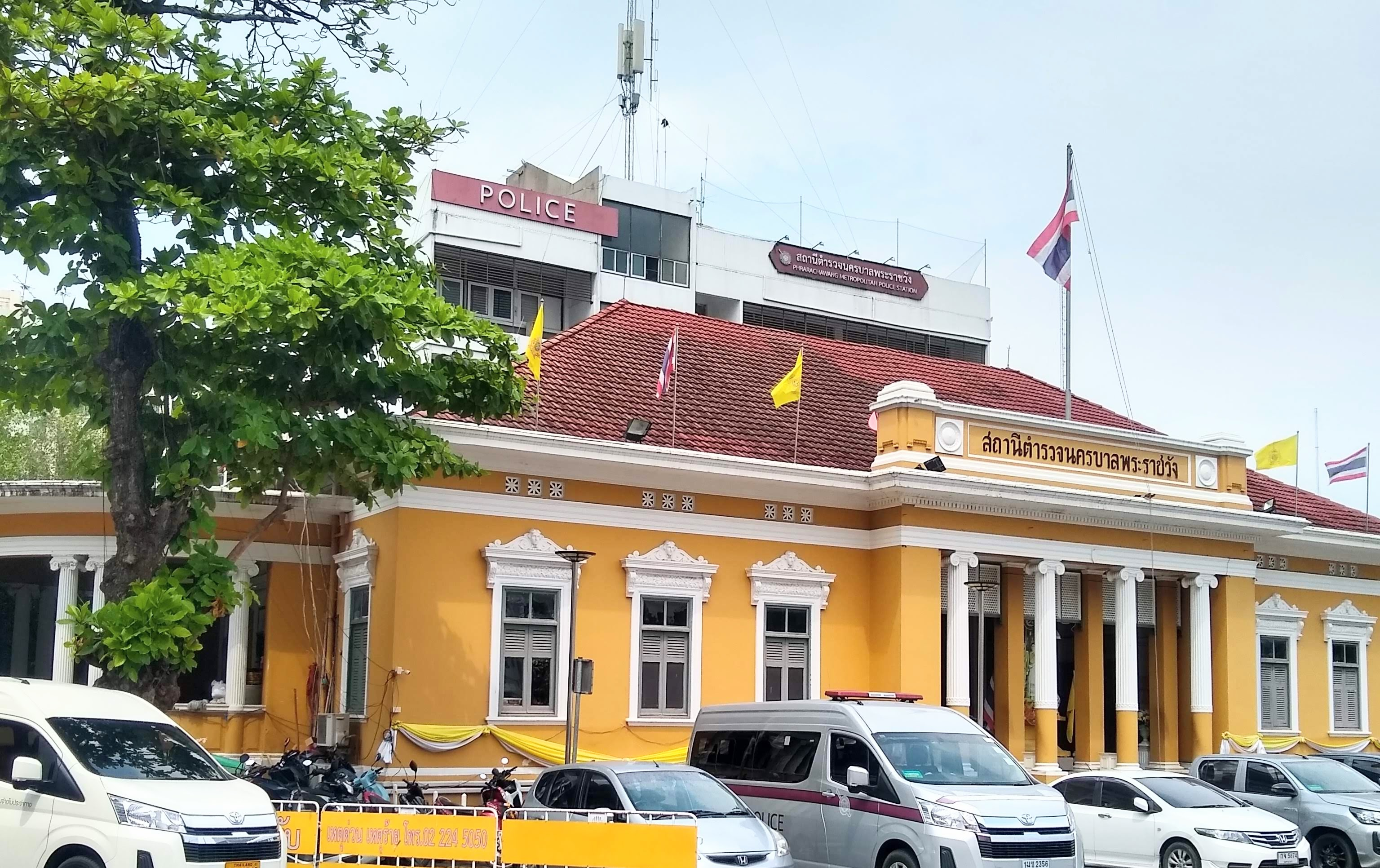
- Interactive map of the Phra Ratchawang Police Station area

General information
- Architectural style: Baroque
- Location: Maharat Road, Maha Ratchawang subdistrict, Phra Nakhon district, Bangkok, Thailand
- Completed: 1915
- Owner: Royal Thai Police

Technical details
- Floor count: 1

Design and construction
- Architect: Mario Tamagno

Phra Ratchawang Police Station is a historical building in Phra Nakhon district, Bangkok, Thailand.

== History ==
Situated at the corner of Maharat Road and Rachini Road in Rattanakosin Island, the historic centre of Bangkok, Phra Ratchawang Police Station (the Royal Palace Police Station) occupies land previously belonging to a palace built by King Rama III (1824–1851) as a residence for one of his sons.

During the reign of King Vajiravudh (Rama VI, 1910–1925) the palace was demolished, and the Italian architect Mario Tamagno—who designed a number of buildings in Bangkok including the adjacent former Ministry of Commerce building (now the Museum Siam)—was commissioned to design a new building on the site to be used as government offices. Construction was completed in 1915.

== Description ==
Constructed in the Baroque style, the one-storey building features Ionic columns at its entrance and in two semi-circular balconies at each end. The windows are made of wooden louvres with the slats set in frames with stucco decorations including leaf patterns and a woman's face.

The building was registered as a national monument by the Fine Arts Department in 1977.

The police station served as a filming location for a scene in the television series In Family We Trust, aired in 2018.
