= Wat Ratchapradit =

Buddhist temple in Bangkok, Thailand

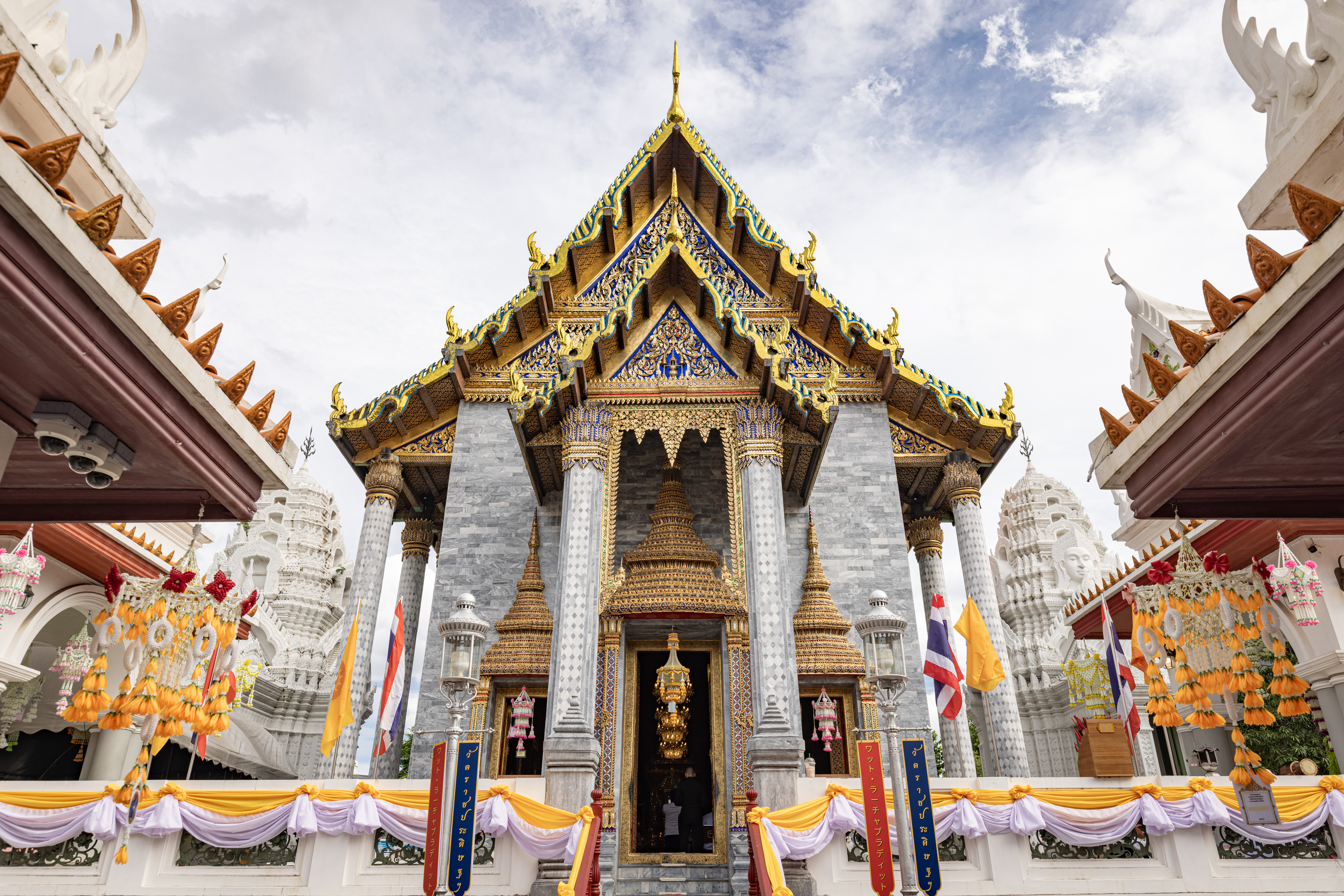
- The Vihāra of Wat Ratchapradit

- Location within Bangkok

Religion
- Affiliation: Theravada Buddhism
- Sect: Dhammayuttika Nikaya

Location
- Country: Phra Nakhon District, Bangkok, Thailand
- Interactive map of Wat Ratchapradit
- Coordinates: 13°44′58.441217″N 100°29′43.87822″E

Architecture
- Founder: King Mongkut (Rama IV)
- Completed: 1864; 162 years ago

Website
- Wat

Wat Ratchapradit Sathit Mahasimaram Ratcha Wora Maha Viharn (Thai: วัดราชประดิษฐสถิตมหาสีมารามราชวรวิหาร) is a Buddhist temple in the Phra Nakhon District of Bangkok. Wat Ratchaparadit was designated a first-class royal monastery in 1915, making it one of the most significant temples in Thailand.

The temple is located on Rachini Road, south of Saranrom Palace, next to the Privy Council chambers and near the Grand Palace, its main entrance is on Saranrom Road. Wat Ratchabopit is located diagonally across the Khlong Khu Mueang Derm (also Khlong Lot) on Rattanakosin Island.

== History ==
The land on which the temple now stands was formerly designated by King Nangklao (Rama III) as a coffee plantation. However, after his death, his successor King Mongkut (Rama IV) decided to build a temple on the land instead.

According to King Mongkut the three principal temples in the old capital city of Ayutthaya were; Wat Mahathat, Wat Ratchaburana and Wat Rachapradit. Ever since the establishment of Bangkok as the capital city in 1782, only two temples with those names were built; Wat Mahathat and Wat Ratchaburana. The king was determined therefore to build a temple with the name Wat Rachapradit for the people of Bangkok.

The king encountered a problem when he found the land too soft, being next to a canal. To solve this problem the king decide to host a public performance of Thai traditional dance on the site. The cost of admission being an empty garlic jar per audience. These garlic jars were then collected and used by the king's workmen as the foundation of the main ordination hall of the temple.

Construction began in 1864 and was completed seven months later. The temple's full name as given by the king was Wat Ratchapradit Sathit Mahasimaram. As the temple's first abbot, the king appointed Sa Pussadeva, a monk from Wat Bowonniwet Vihara. A member of the Dhammayuttika sect, the abbot made Wat Rachapradit the sect's first temple. In 1893 King Chulalongkorn (Rama V) would make the abbot Supreme Patriarch.

== Structures ==
The main structure is the Phra Viharn Luang (Thai: พระวิหารหลวง), it is both a Vihāra and an ordination hall. Situated on a raised platform the Phra Viharn Luang is covered on the outside with grey marble tiles. The pediment depicts a golden royal crown on a blue glass background, the crown was the emblem of King Mongkut. The central door and two windows on either side are framed in gilded teak. Above them are traditional crown-shaped pediments, an allusion to the king's emblem.

Inside are murals painted in the reign of King Chulalongkorn, depicting royal festivals of the twelve months. The main Buddha image is a replica of the Phra Phuttha Sihing, underneath it are interred the ashes of King Mongkut. On the wall opposite the Buddha image is a mural depicting King Mongkut watching the solar eclipse at Wakor village, Prachuap Khiri Khan Province on 18 August 1868.

The Pasana Chedi (Thai: ปาสาณเจดีย์) or the 'Stone Chedi' is a large Sri-Lankan style stupa, which is situated behind the Phra Viharn Luang. The stupa is covered in grey marbles tiles and was built by King Mongkut.

On either side of the Phra Viharn Luang are two almost identical white shrines, with a prang-style spire on the top, these are termed prasat and denote specially royal or sacred buildings. The eastern shrine is the Ho Trai (Thai: หอไตร) or the library of sacred texts. The pediment features scenes of the Buddha's birth and his passing into Parinibbana. To the west is the Ho Phra Chom (Thai: หอพระจอม), decorated with the faces of Brahma on four sides. Inside the shrine is a life-sized statue of King Mongkut in gilded bronze. around these main buildings are smaller stupas containing relics of various monks including the temple's first abbot. Like the two shrines, these smaller stupas were built during the reign of King Vajiravudh (Rama VI), in the early 20th century.

== Gallery ==
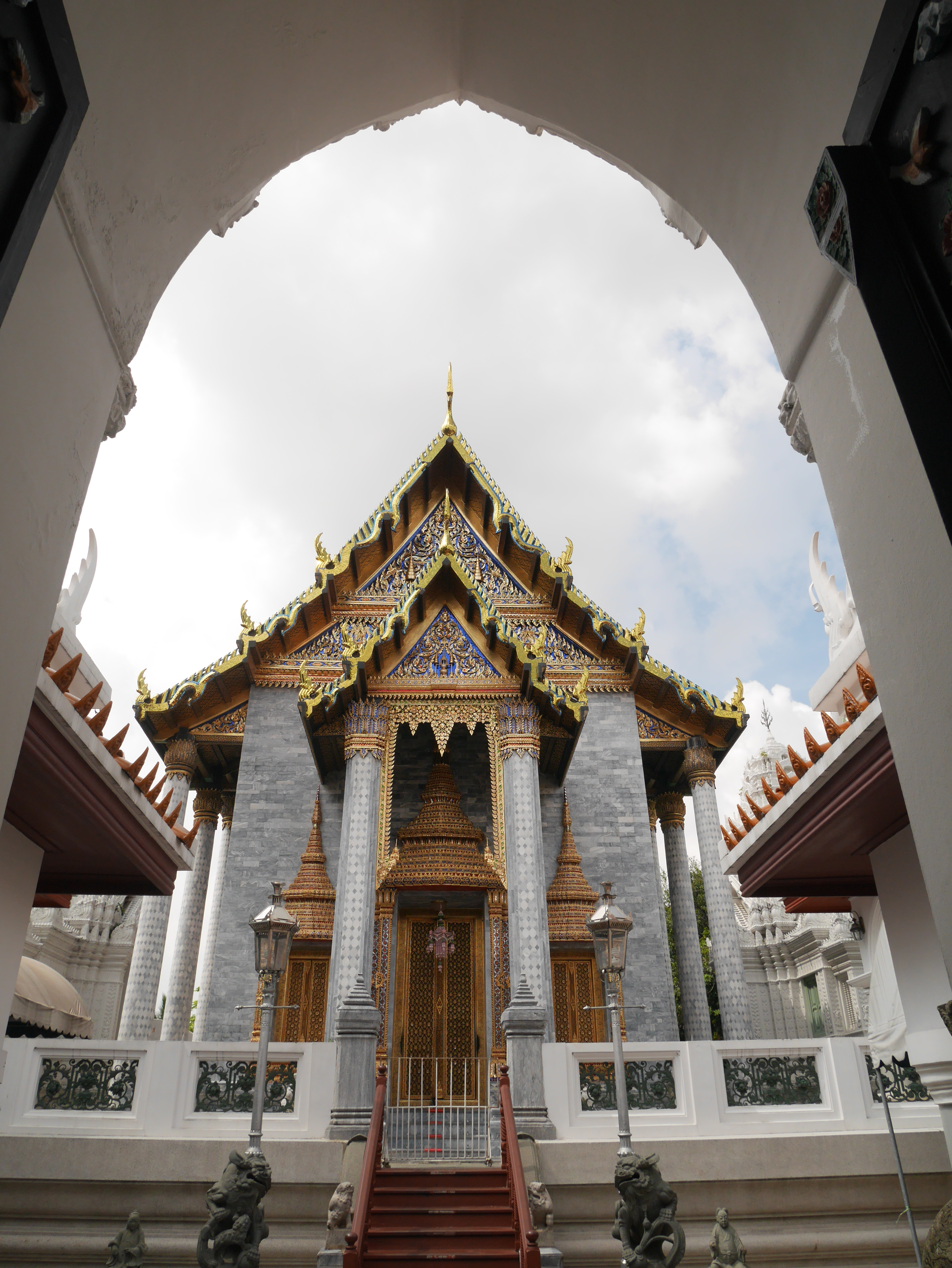
Through the gate of the temple and the front of the Phra Viharn Luang

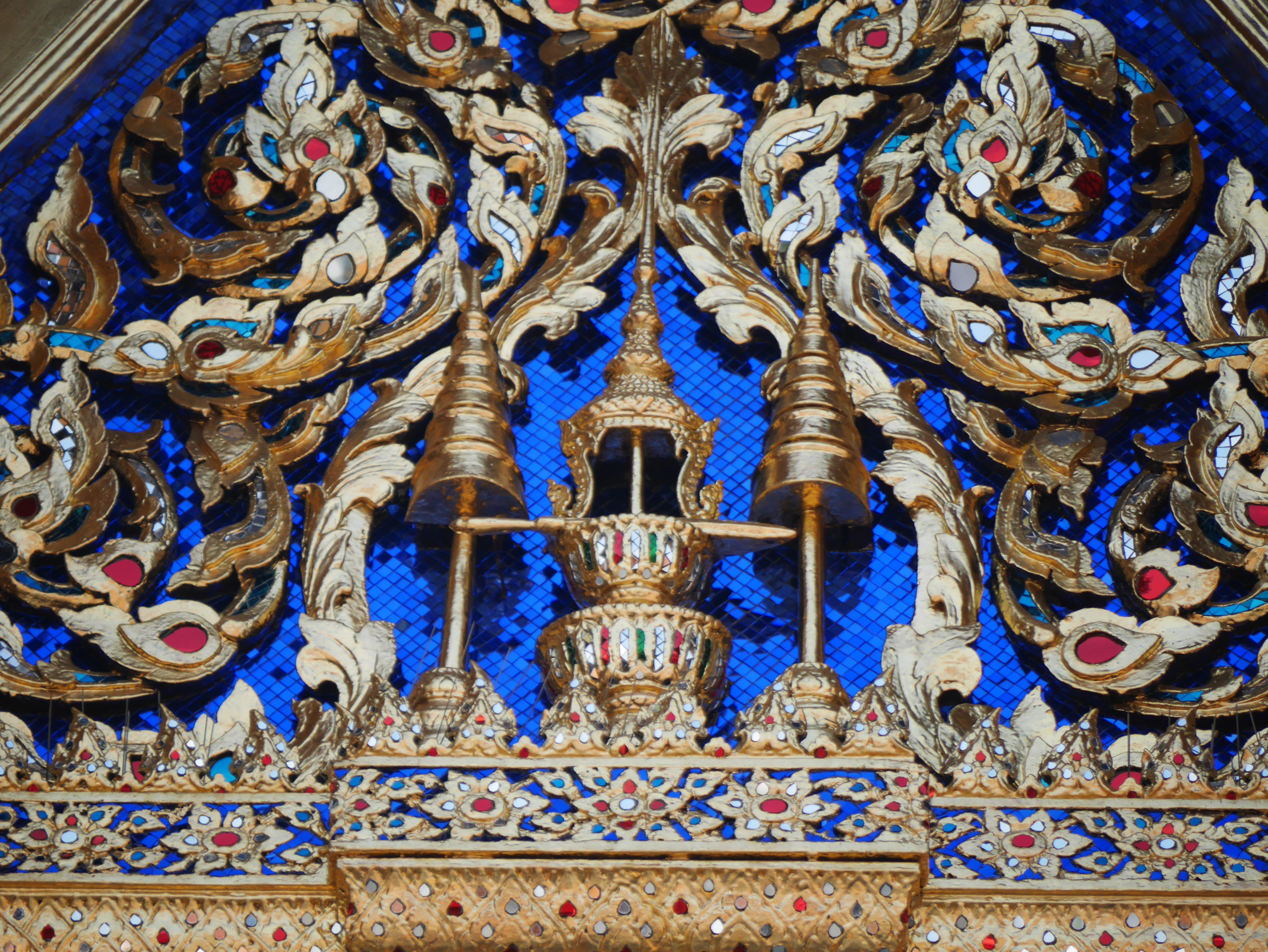
The pediment depicting a royal crown, the symbol of King Mongkut

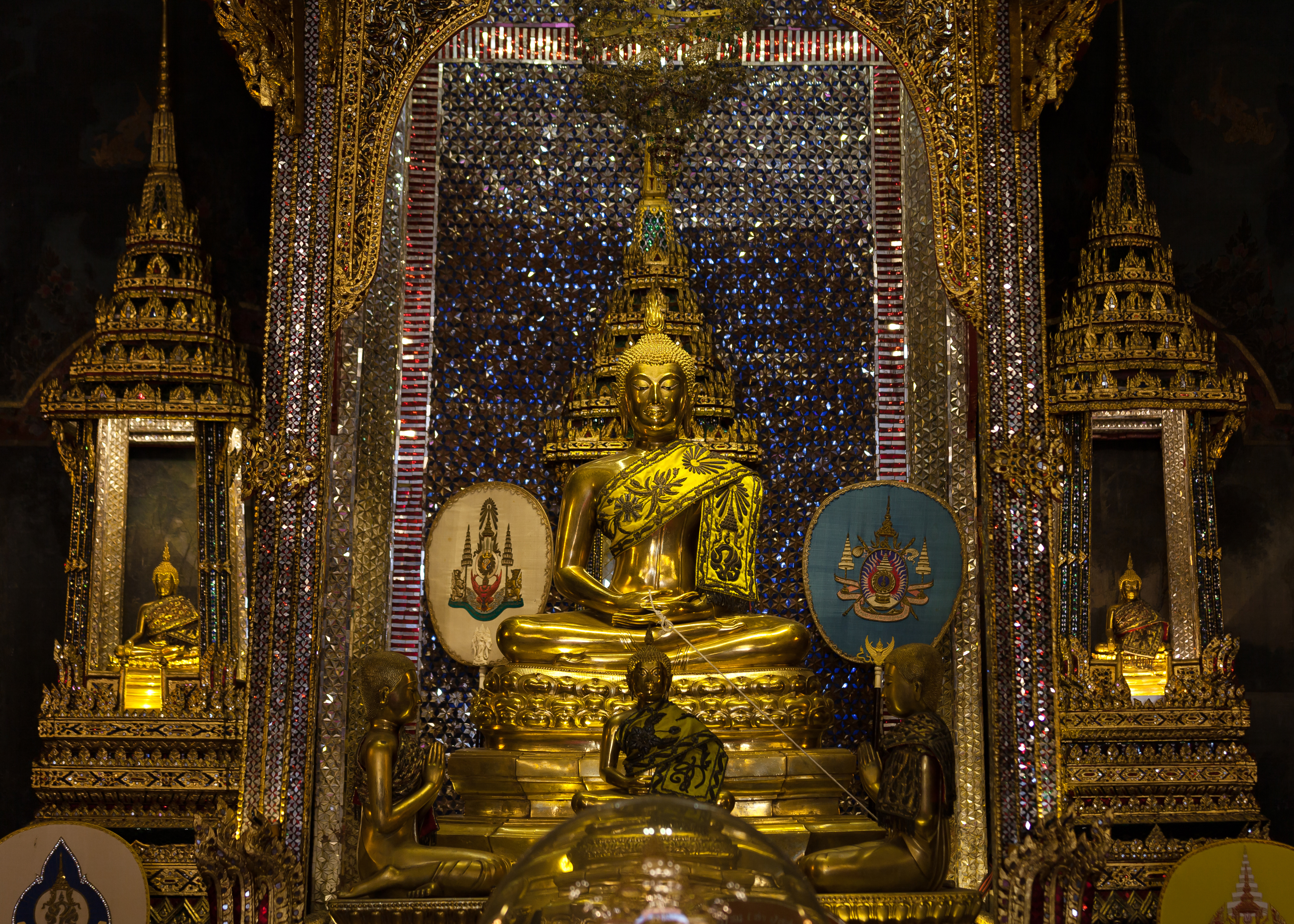
Principal Buddha image inside the Phra Viharn Luang, a replica of the sacred Phra Phuttha Sihing

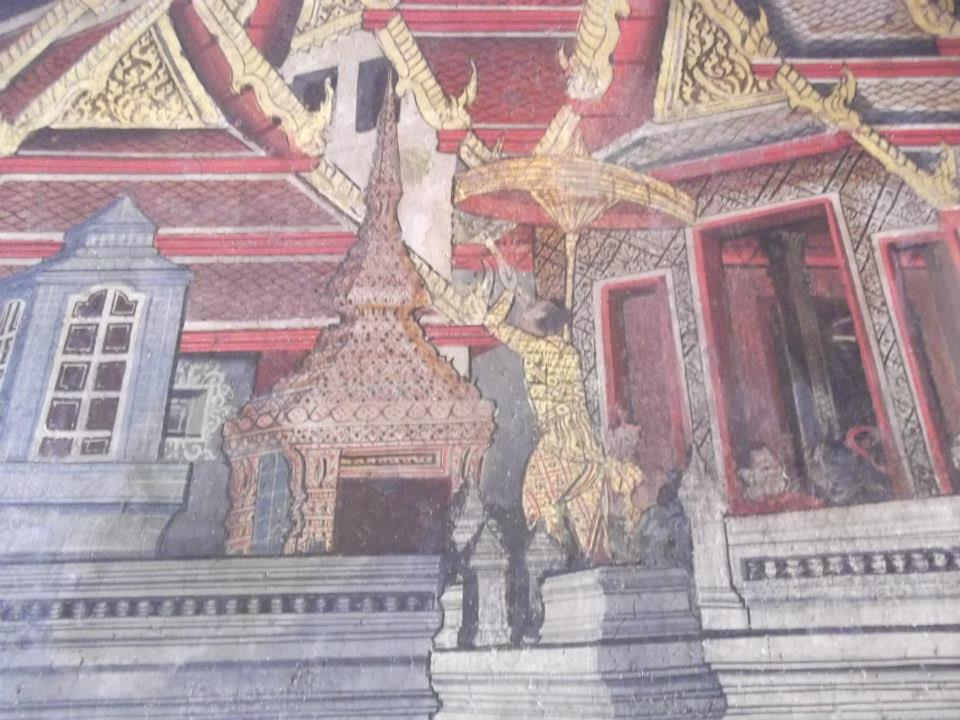
A mural depicting King Mongkut looking through a telescope

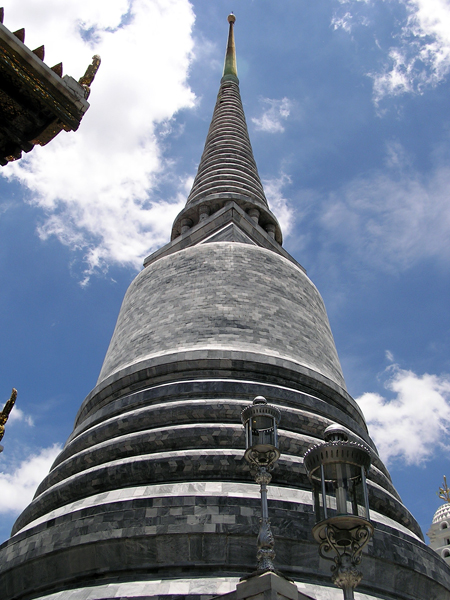
The Pasana Chedi covered in grey marble tiles

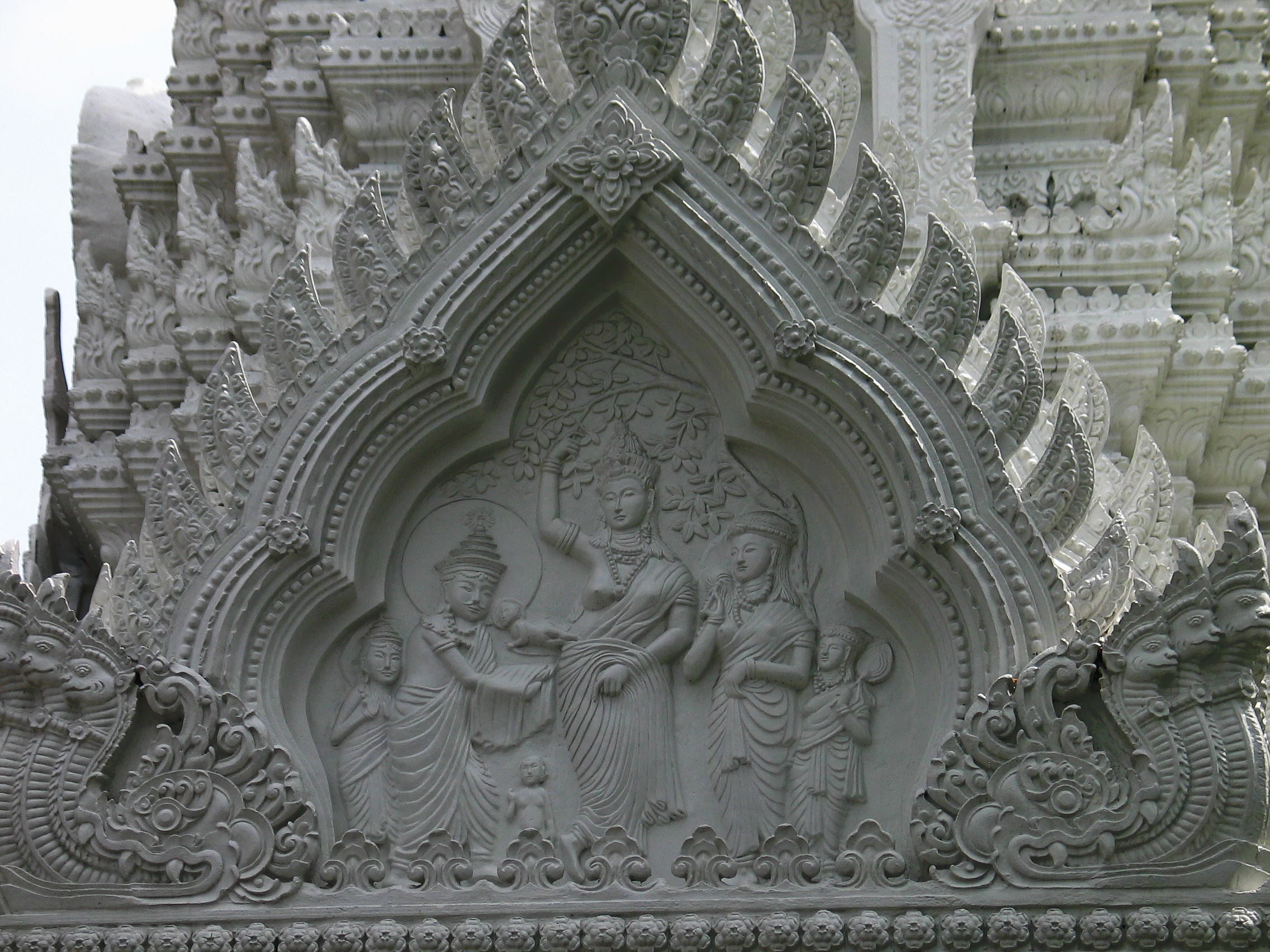
Ho Trai pediment depicting the birth of the Buddha

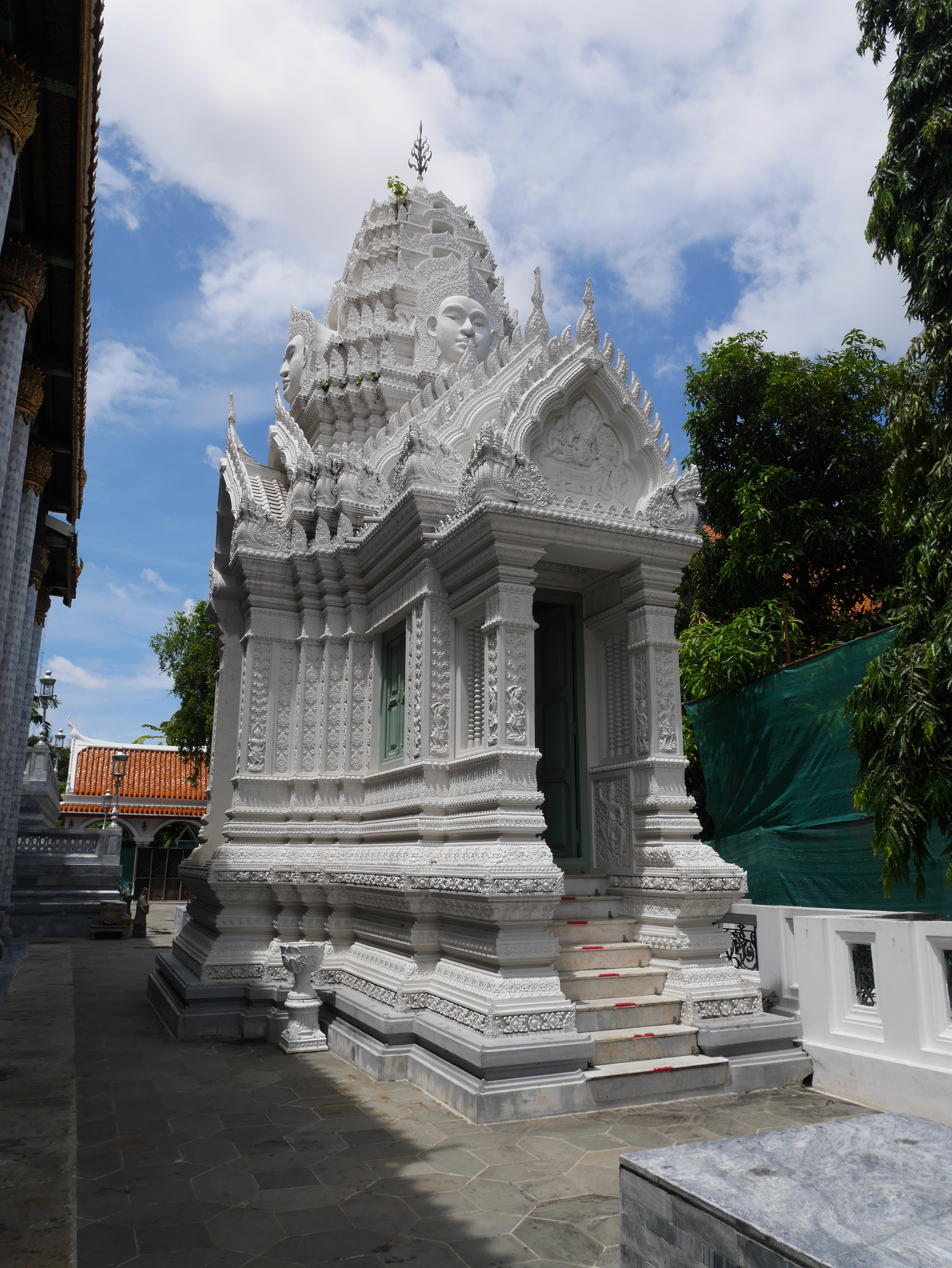
Ho Phra Chom with the faces of Brahma

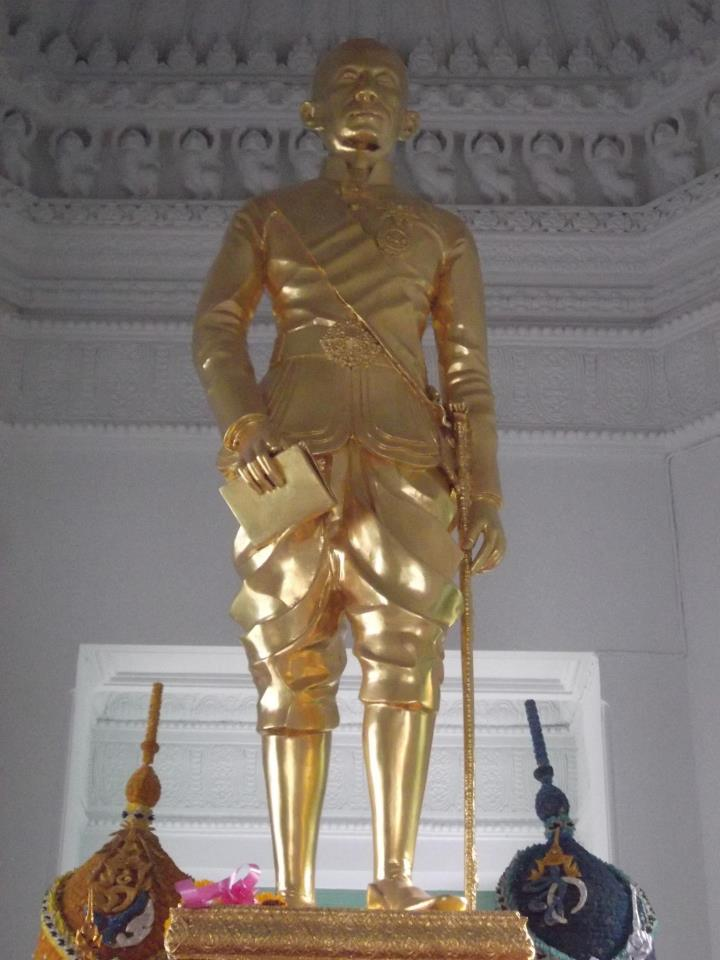
The life-sized statue of King Mongkut

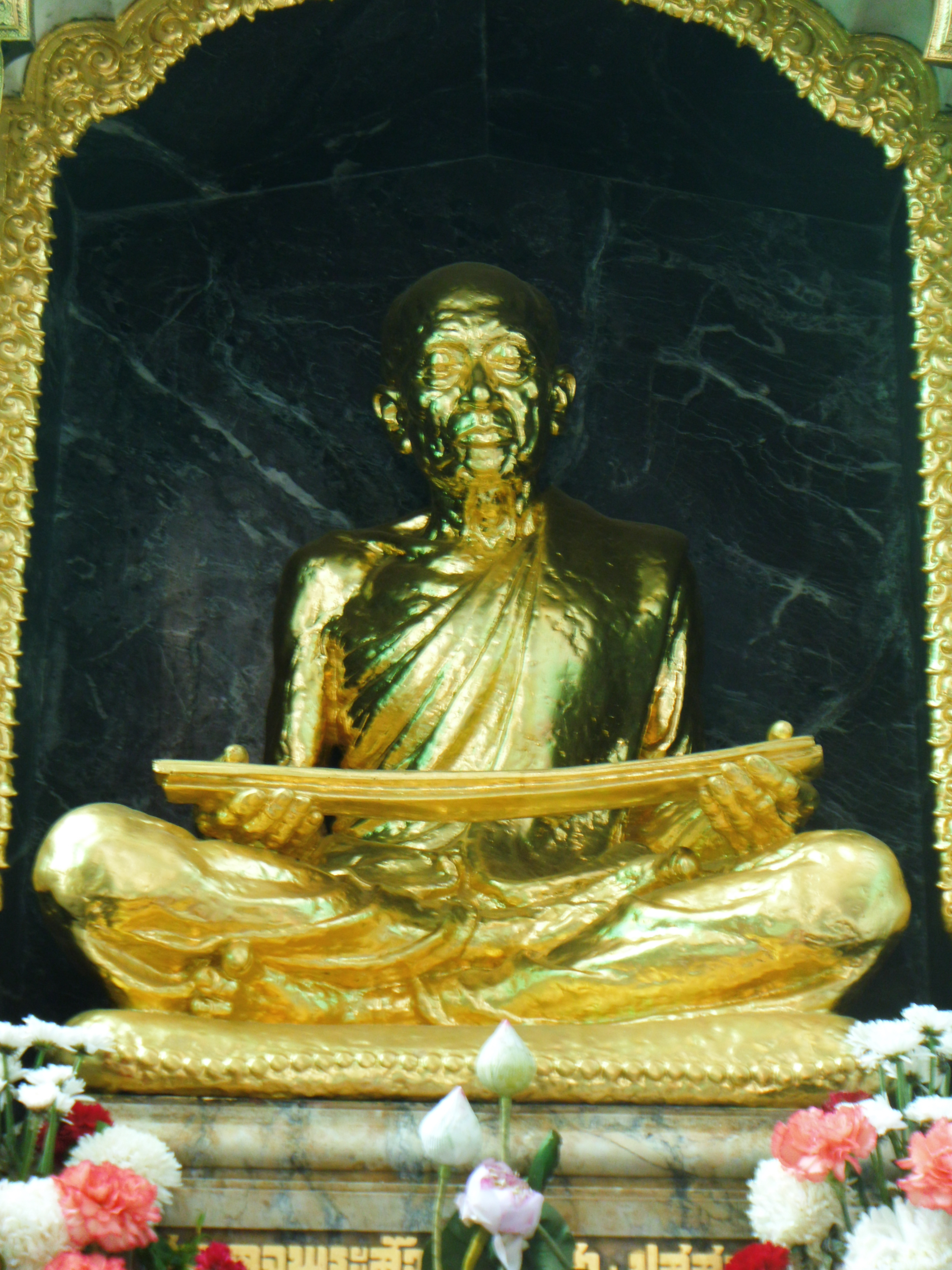
A statue of Ariyavangsagatayana (Sa Pussadeva), the first abbot of this temple

== See also ==
- List of Buddhist temples in Thailand
- Mongkut
- Ariyavangsagatayana (Sa Pussadeva)
- Dhammayuttika Nikaya
