= Royal Barge Suphannahong =

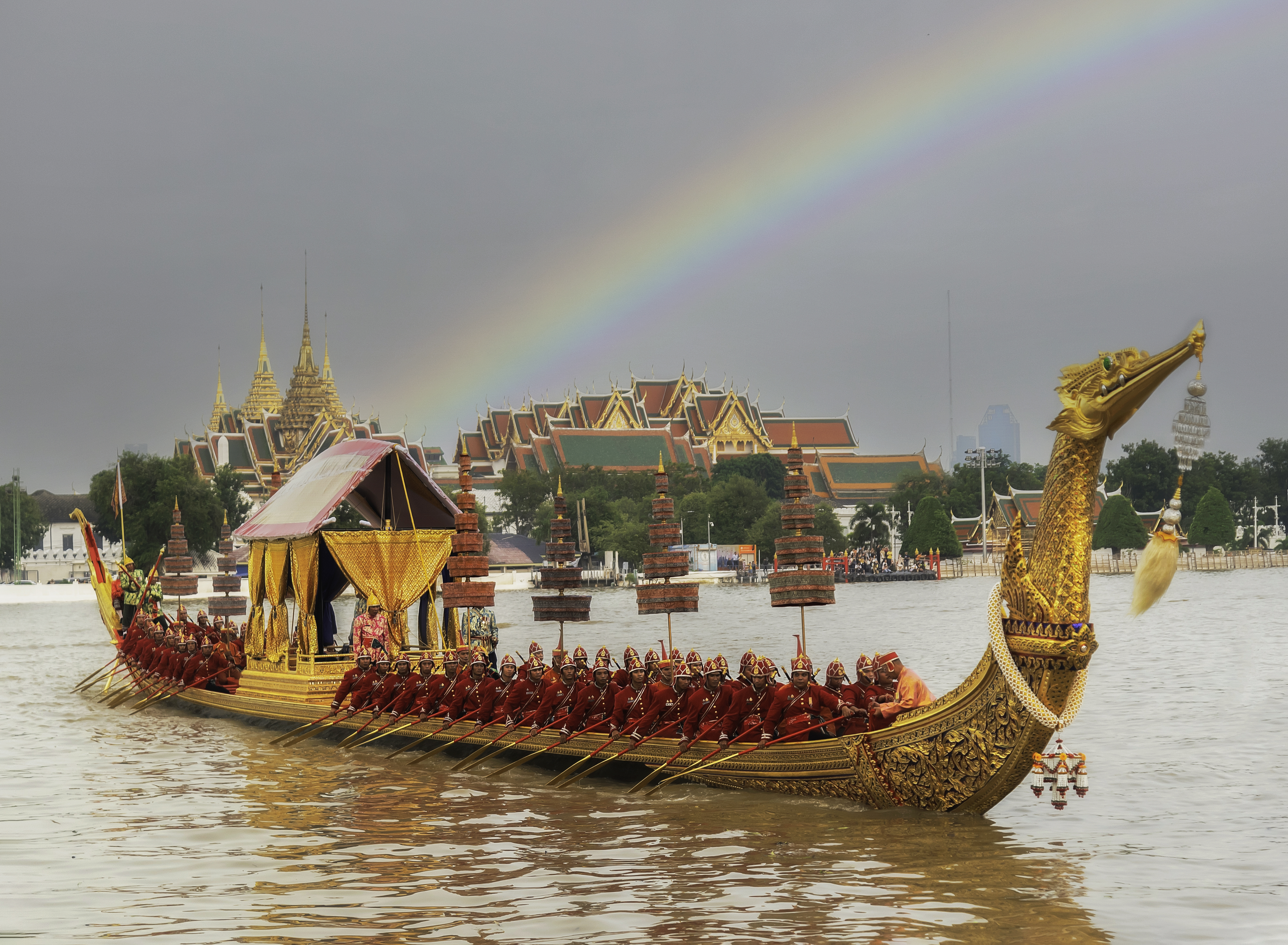
- Royal Barge Suphannahong

History

Thailand
- Name: Suphannahong
- Namesake: Golden Swan; Phoenix
- Owner: Bureau of the Royal Household
- Operator: Royal Thai Navy
- Honors and awards: The World Ship Trust Maritime Heritage Award 1992

General characteristics
- Type: Royal barge
- Displacement: 15.1 tons
- Length: 44.9 m
- Beam: 3.14 m
- Draught: 0.41 m
- Depth: 0.9 m
- Crew: 57

The Royal Barge Suphannahong (Thai: เรือพระที่นั่งสุพรรณหงส์) is a royal barge in Thailand It is one of the four main royal barges used in the Royal Barge Procession. As it is the barge that the King of Thailand uses during the procession, Suphannahong is considered the most important royal barge. When it is not commissioned, it is on display at the National Museum of Royal Barges in Bangkok.

== History ==
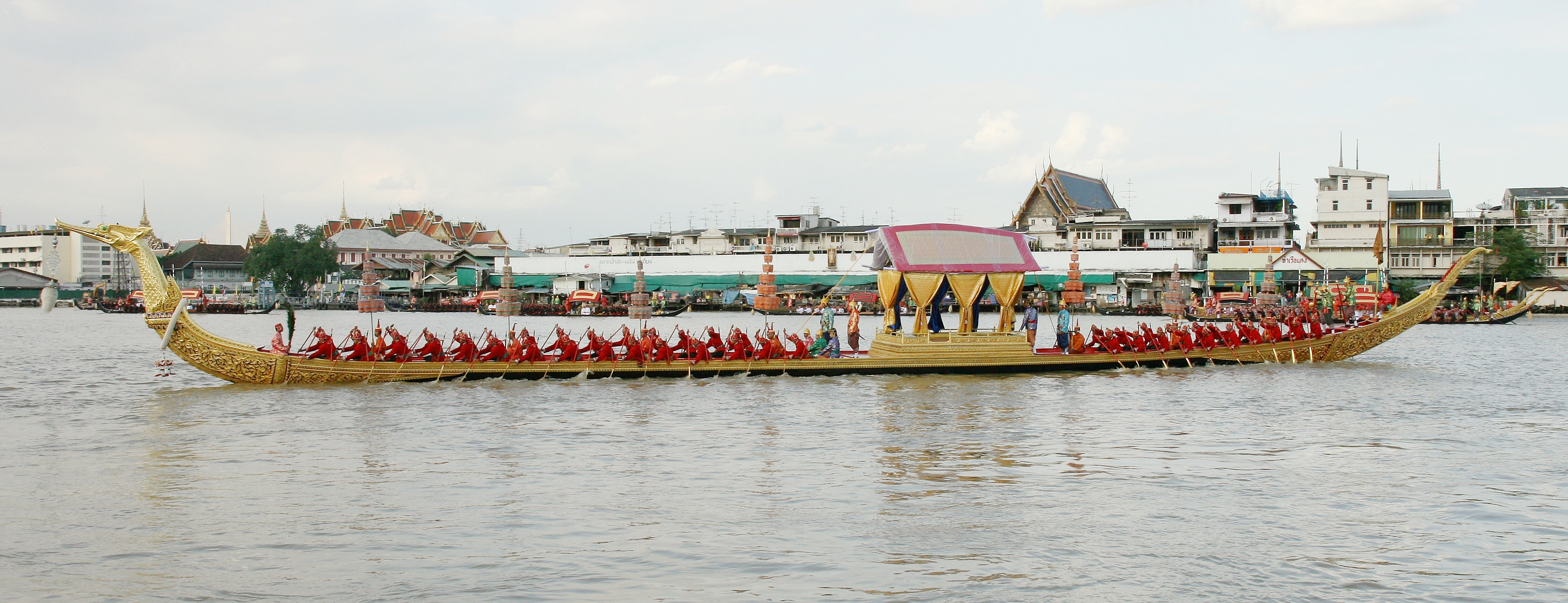
Royal Barge Suphannahongse of Thailand. Dress rehearsal on 29 October 2007 for 5 November 2007 Royal Barge Procession for Royal Kathin Ceremony at Wat Arun.

The Royal Barge "Sri Suphannahong" was first mentioned in the barge-rowing poems of Prince Thammathibet in 1548, during the early reign of King Maha Chakkraphat of the Ayutthaya Kingdom. The annals of Thai military boats written by Prince Damrong Rajanubhab mentions the construction of the "Sri Suphannahong" royal barge during the reign of King Rama I. It was used and gradually became dilapidated over the years.

The current barge was reconstructed by King Rama V which was completed in the reign of King Rama VI, and at the same time was renamed as "Suphannahong". The barge was launched by the head artisan Lt. Gen. Phraya Ratchasongkhram on 13 November 1911.

== Barge details ==
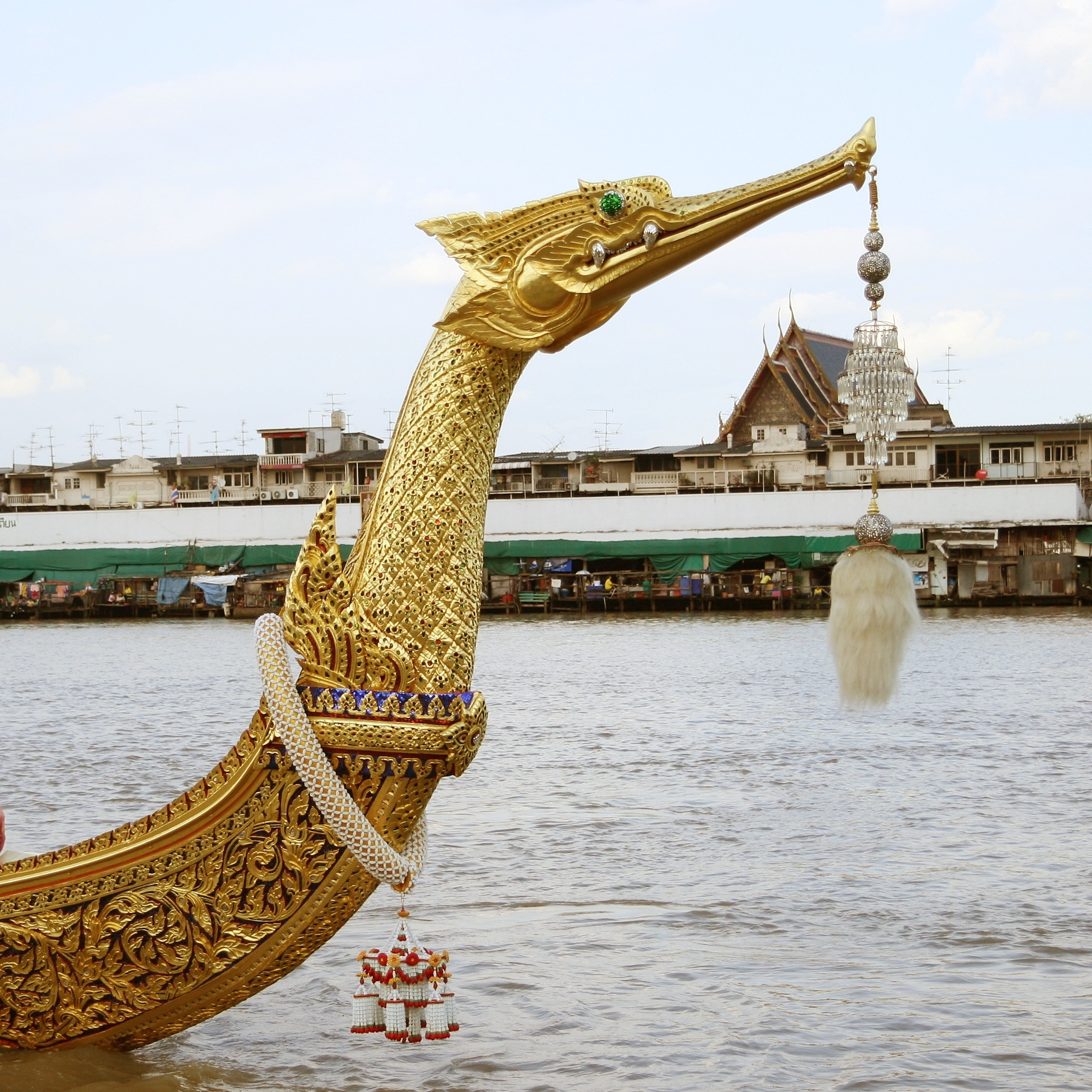
Barge's bow

The royal barge's distinct feature is the bow shaped as the head of a golden swan/phoenix and is decorated with a tassel hanging from the mouth, made from yak hair imported from Nepal.

The royal barge was awarded the Maritime Heritage Award of the year 1992, from the World Ship Trust, based in the United Kingdom. The award was granted to the Fine Arts Department for its role in refurbishment of the ship.

The Royal Barge Suphannahong has become a renowned icon of Thai culture, having been used as the namesake for awards such as the Suphannahong National Film Awards, as well as aircraft livery for Thai Airways International and the logo of the Tourism Authority of Thailand.

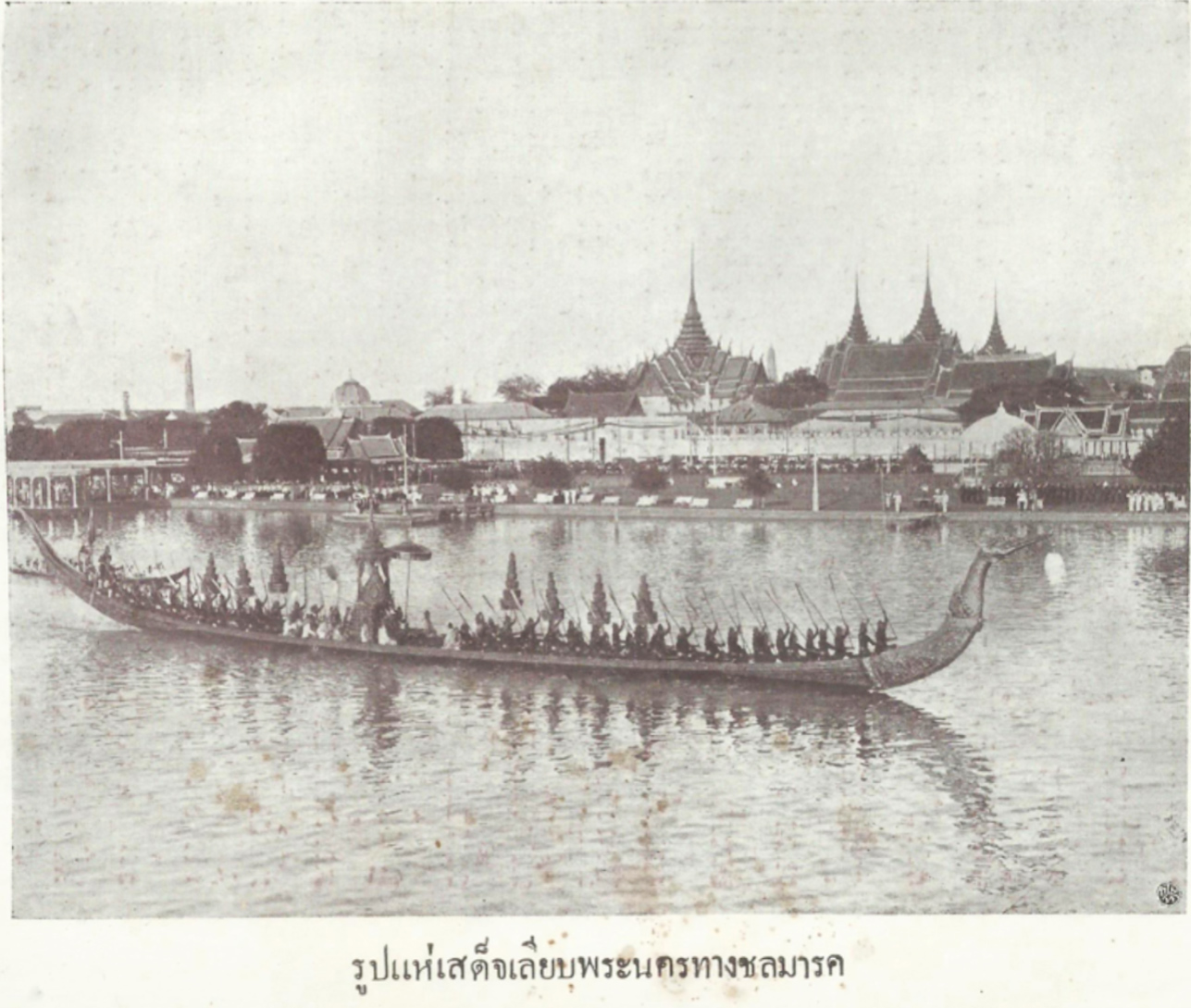
Suphannahong in 1911

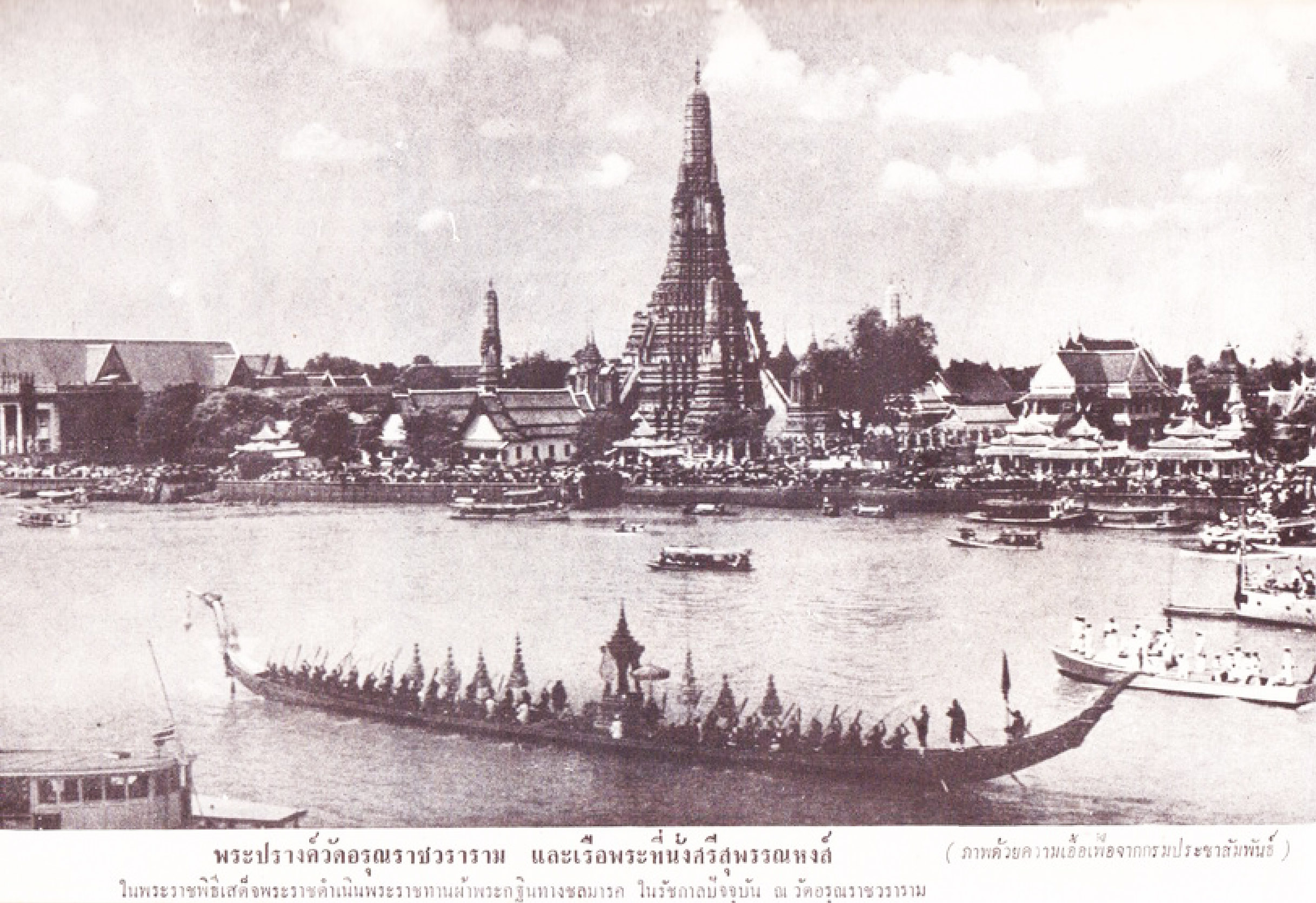
Suphannahong in 1968

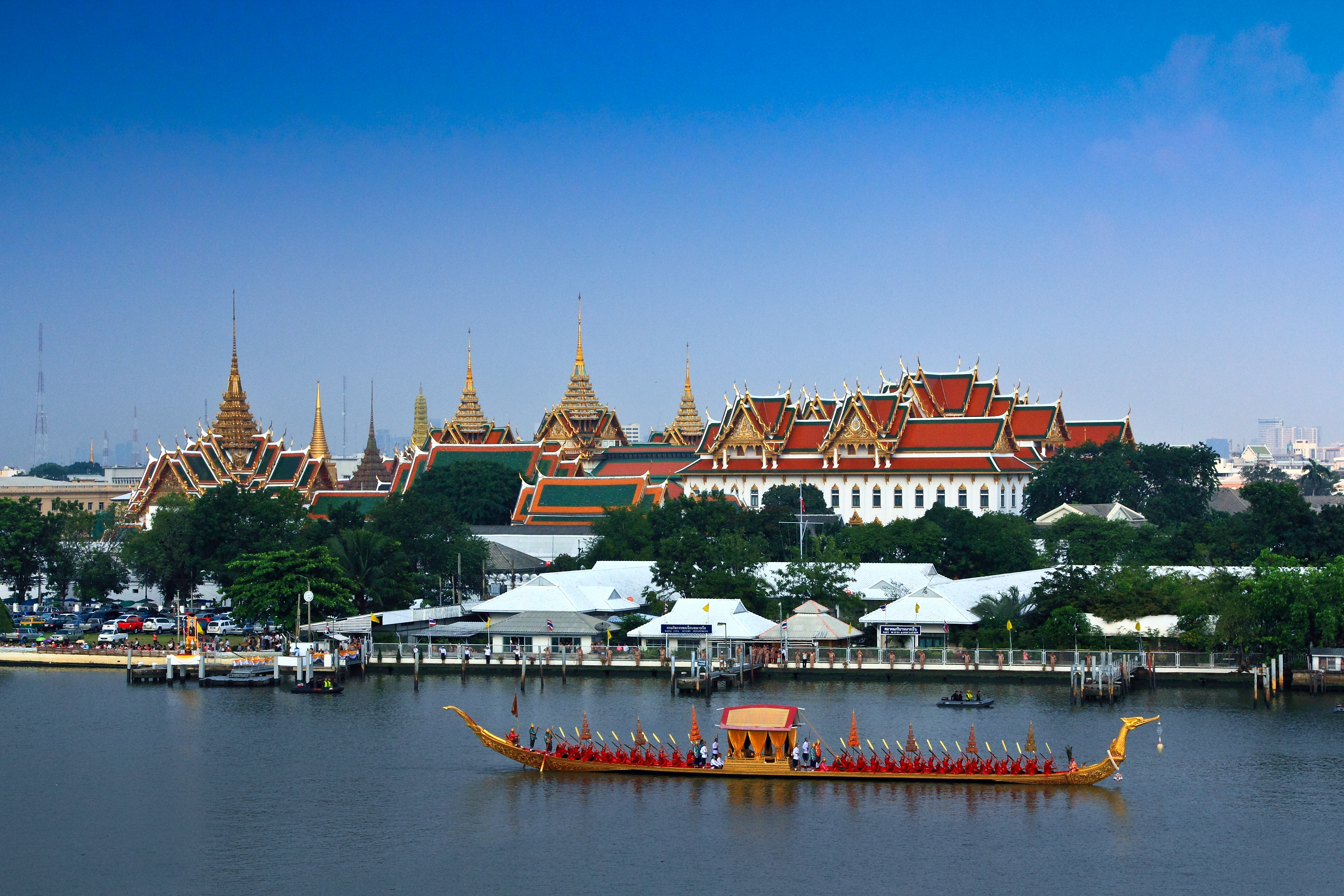
Suphannahong in 2012

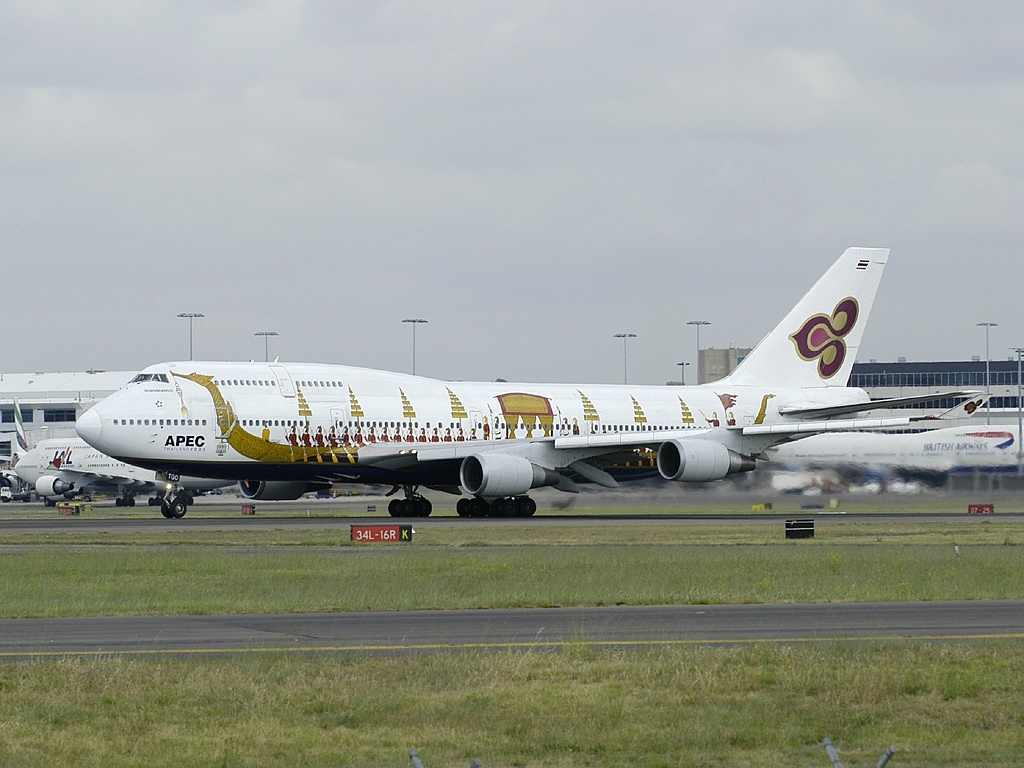
Thai Airways Boeing 747 in "Suphannahong" livery
