= Rachini Road =

Road in Bangkok, Thailand

Coordinates: 13°45′02.0″N 100°29′46.1″E

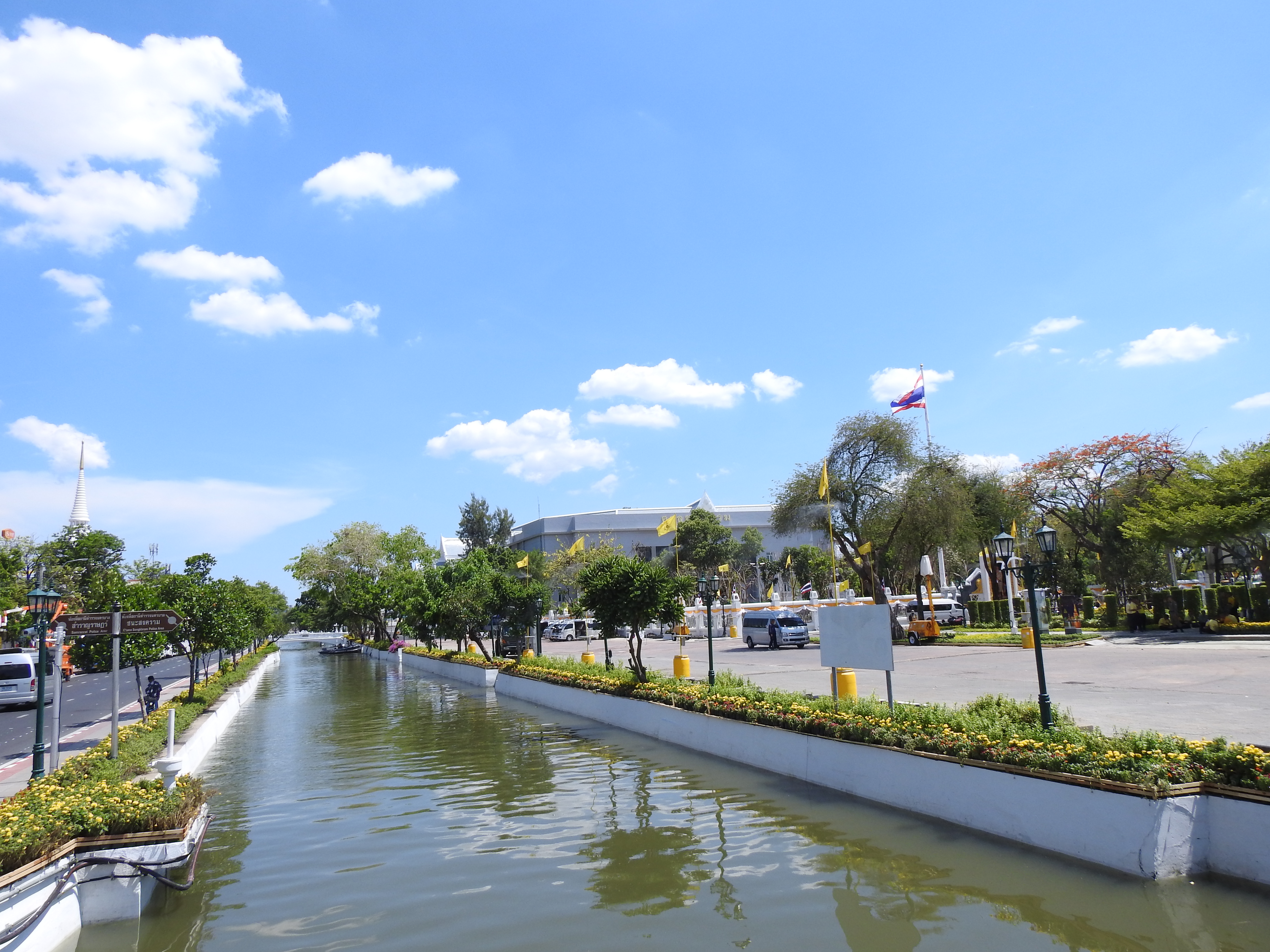
Khlong Khu Mueang Doem (old moat city canal), or familiarly known as Khlong Lot (tube canal) in the portion near Supreme Court, Atsadang Road (left) and Rachini Road (right)

Rachini Road (Thai: ถนนราชินี, pronounced [tʰā.nǒn rāː.t͡ɕʰī.nīː]) is a road in inner Bangkok (Rattanakosin Island), located in Phra Borom Maha Ratchawang Subdistrict of Phra Nakhon District.

The road begins at the point where it branches off from Phra Athit Road in the Tha Chang Wang Na area. It then runs south, passing the corner of Sanam Luang and crossing Ratchadamnoen Avenue (inner section). The road runs parallel to Khlong Khu Mueang Doem, also known as Khlong Lot, and Atsadang Road, continuing until it reaches Sanam Chai Road, passing landmarks such as Rajini School, Charoenrat 31 Bridge, Phra Ratchawang Police Station, Wat Rajabopit School, and Sanam Chai MRT Station (exit 4) in the Pak Khlong Talat area, for a total distance of 2.2 km (1.4 mi).

This road is considered one of the oldest in Bangkok and was part of the route around the outer walls of the Grand Palace. Originally, it was merely a dirt track with no official name. During King Chulalongkorn (Rama V)'s reign, after he returned from visits to Java and Singapore and observed the modern road systems there, he ordered improvements to many roads in Bangkok, including this one.

Its name literally means "The Queen's Road," in honour of Queen Saovabha Phongsri, who served as regent when the king visited Europe in 1897.

Additionally, the first 200 m (656.2 ft) of the road, in front of the National Theatre and Wat Bowon Sathan Sutthawat, is lined with trees, creating a shady, tunnel-like effect.
