= Saranrom Palace =

Former royal residence in Bangkok

Coordinates: 13.750340°N 100.494477°E

Saranrom Palace in december 2023
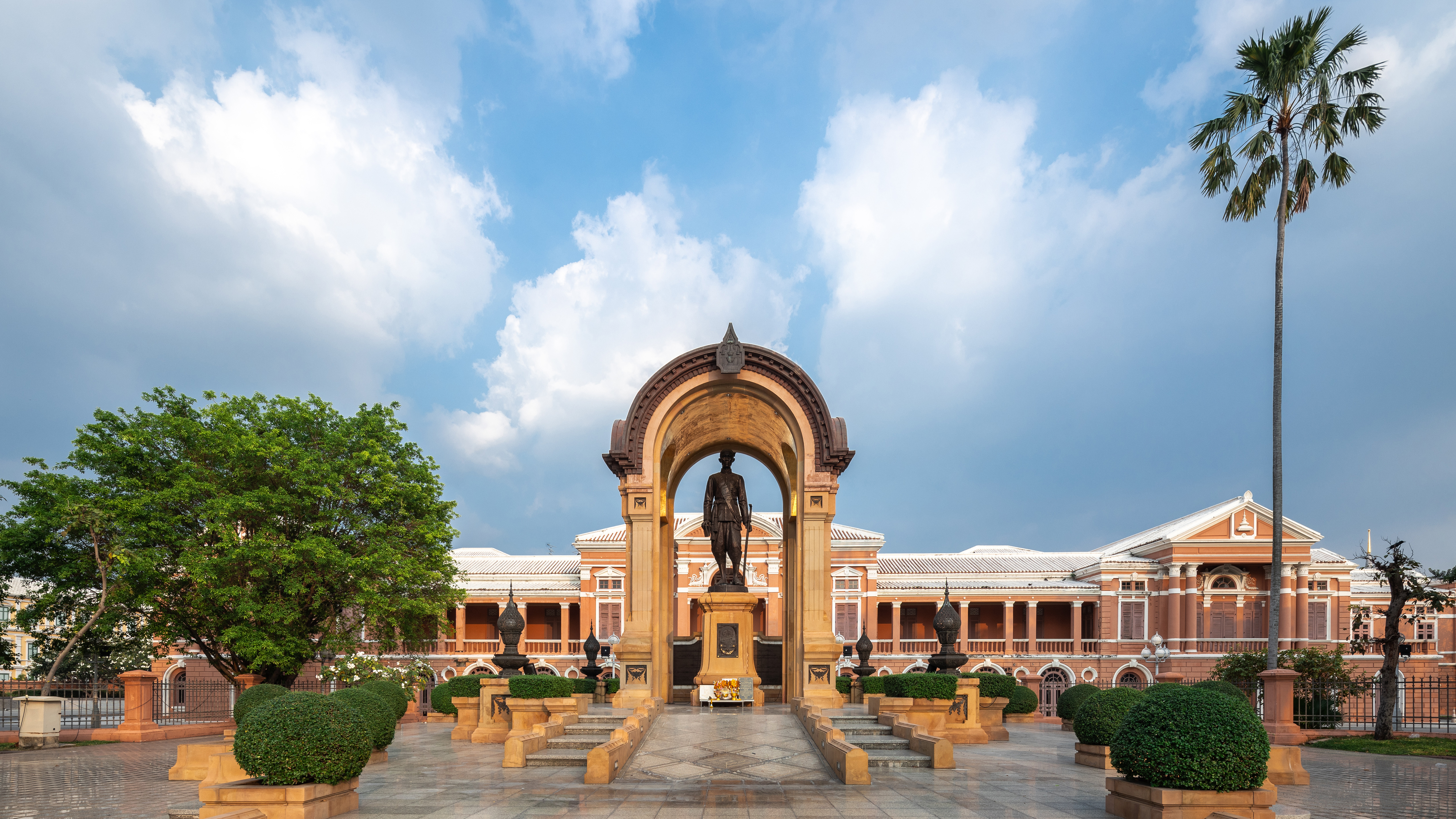
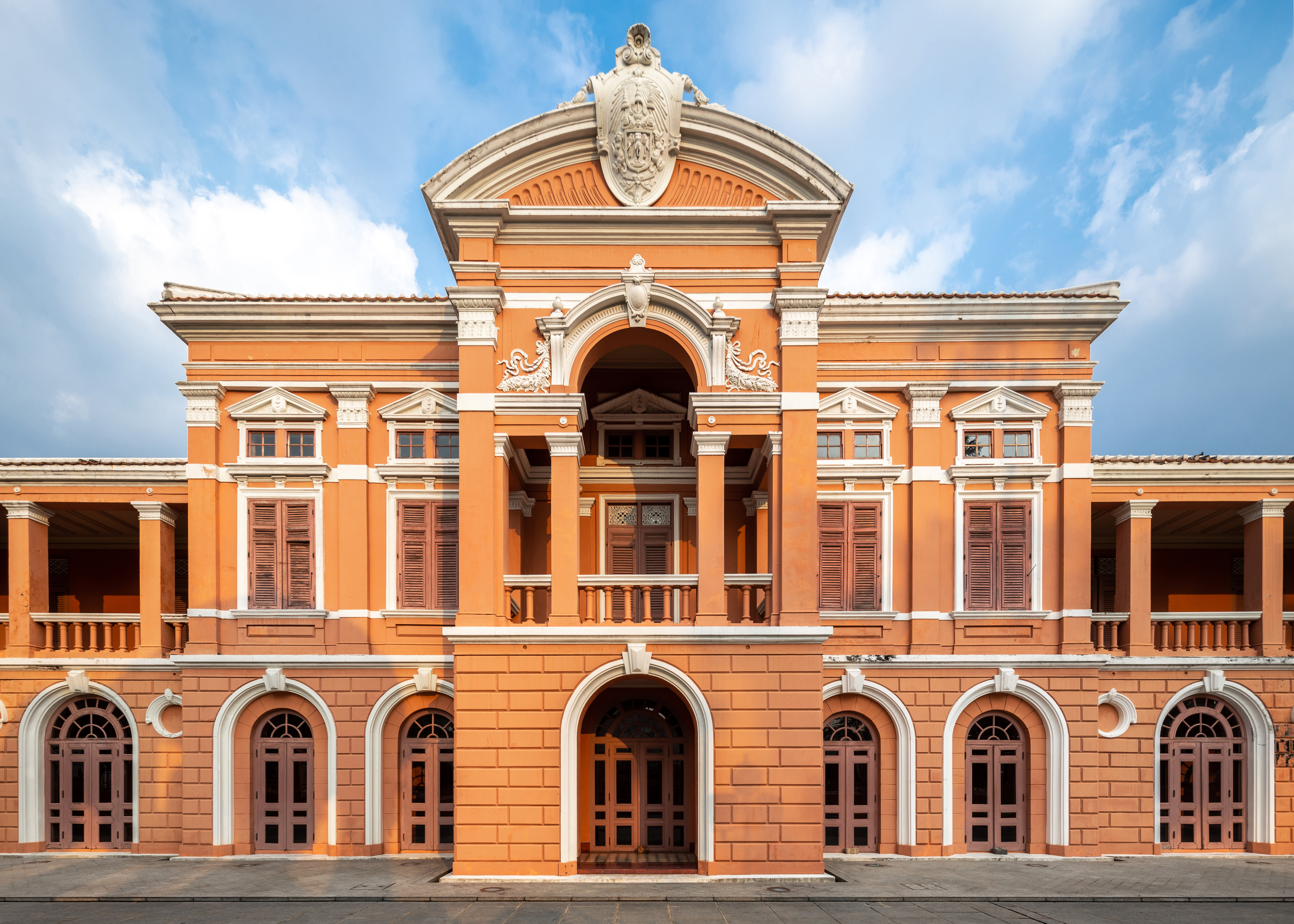

Saranrom Royal Palace (Thai: พระราชวังสราญรมย์) is a former palace in Bangkok, Thailand, located between Grand Palace and Wat Ratchapradit. It served as temporary residence for some princes and as lodging for royal guests. It is now the site of the Museum of the Ministry of Foreign Affairs and Saranrom Park.

== History ==
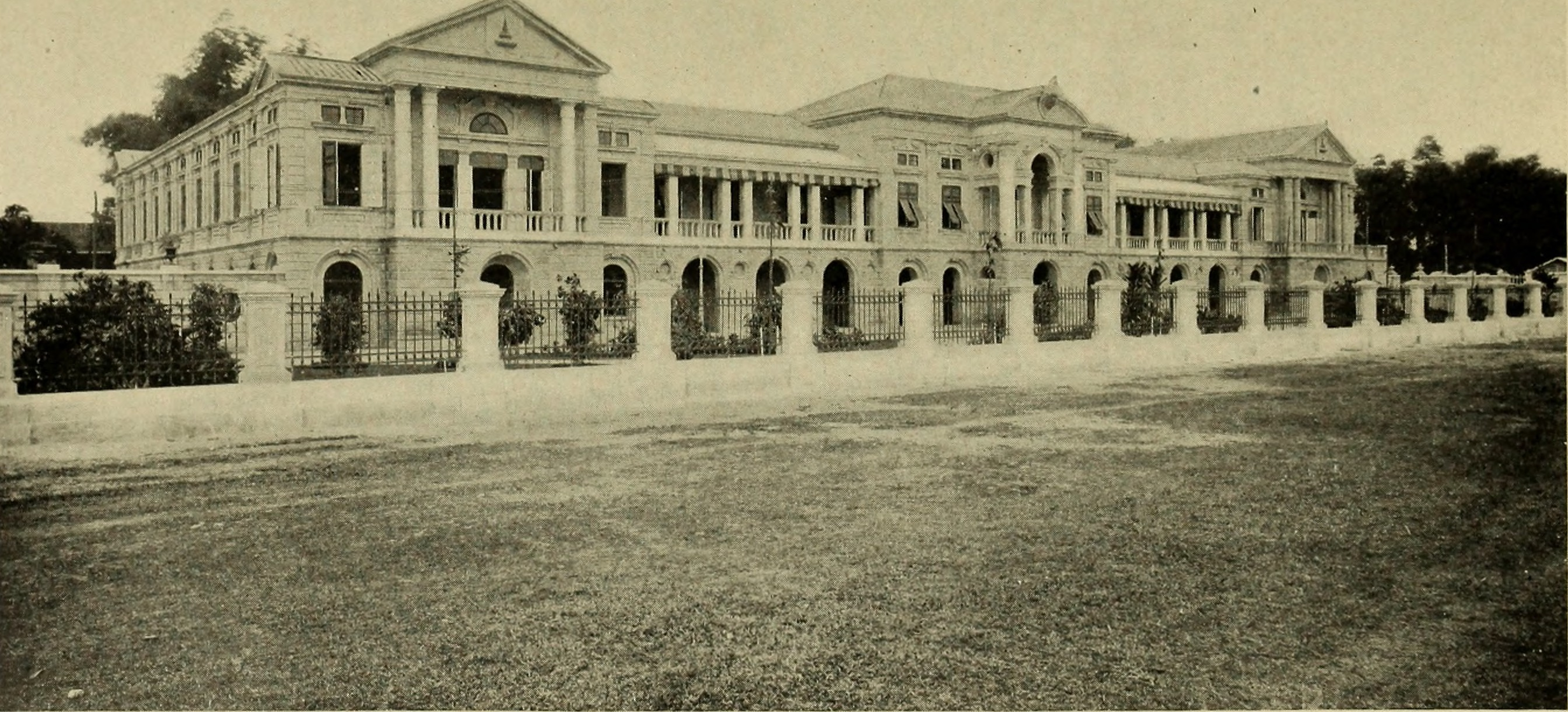
Saranrom Palace in 1904

Saranrom Palace is a two-storey brick building designed by Henry Alabaster, deputy consul general to the British Embassy and advisor to the King. The construction started in 1866, Originally King Rama IV planned to retire to this palace to live in retirement as advisor on state affairs and decided to give the throne to his heir Prince Chulalongkorn but King Rama IV died in 1868 before completion of the construction.

Early in the reign of King Rama V, the king granted this palace to the princes as a temporary residence when they moved out of the Grand Palace such as Prince Chaturonrasmi and Prince Bhanurangsi Savangwongse. Later on, the palace was used to accommodate foreign guests until the reign of King Rama VI, starting with Prince Oscar Bernadotte of Sweden in 1884. Others such as Nicholas II (when he was Tsesarevich of Russia), Prince George of Greece and Denmark, and Prince Fushimi Hiroyasu.

King Rama VII transferred the palace to the Ministry of Foreign Affairs to use as headquarters. The Saranrom Palace was used in that capacity until 1992, when the Ministry of Foreign Affairs moved to Sri Ayutthaya Building in Ratchathewi District.

When Saranrom Palace was still the office of the Ministry of Foreign Affairs, it was once where the founding members of ASEAN 5 countries Thailand, Malaysia, Singapore, Indonesia and Philippines signed ASEAN Declaration on 8 August 1967 to establish the Association of Southeast Asian Nations (ASEAN).
