= Wat Rajabopit School =

Coordinates: 13.7439°N 100.4952°E

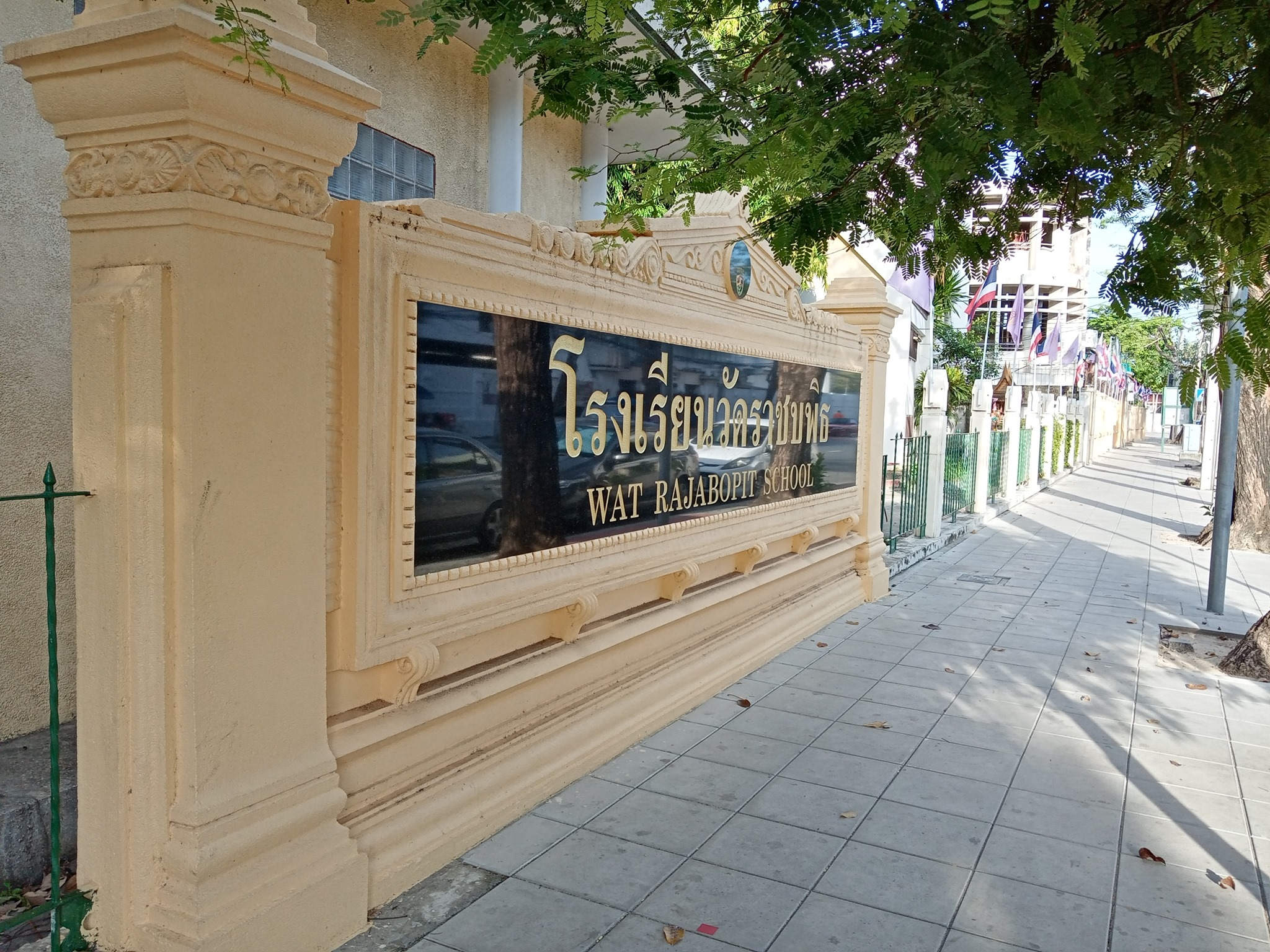
Nameplate of the school

Wat Rajabopit School is a Bangkok public school located in the Phra Nakhon District. It was established on March 2, 1886, during the reign of King Chulalongkorn (Rama V.) The name “Rajabopit” means "established by the king."

== History ==
The school was established by Krom Praya Damrong Rajanubhab as an Art Thai language school near the beginning of Thailand's educational system. It came during the reign of King Rama V. Prince Monk Arunnipakunakorn, once Somdet Budhacariya, abbot of Wat Rajabopit, made an agreement with the Department of Education. This occurred during the era of Chula Sakarat 1247 corresponding to Rattanakosin Era 104 or B.E. 2428. The name “Wat Rajabopit School” appears in the Royal Thai Government Gazette.

Initially, the Prince allowed the school to use the upper section of the monastery's sermon hall beside Fueang Nakhon Road. The sermon hall was used as a storehouse by the monks.

The school enrolled 53 students and 2 teachers. Mr. Kawee was the school's first principal. The first student to pass Prayok was Pranakharase (Mongkol Amatyakul) in B.E. 2430.

Approximately three years later, B.E. 2431, Mr. Payom became principal. The school's popularity led to overcrowding. Consequently, the Prince let the school move to the ground floor of his parsonage. (now the location of Puchong Pratan Witthayasith 1 Building). After enrollment grew again, he let the school use three pavilions of the temple around the chapel and church. The school then offered only primary grades 1–4, serving 100 students, and had Luang Chamnan Anusan (Rod Raktaprajitr) as principal.
