= Democracy Monument =

Public monument in Bangkok, Thailand

Democracy Monument อนุสาวรีย์ประชาธิปไตย
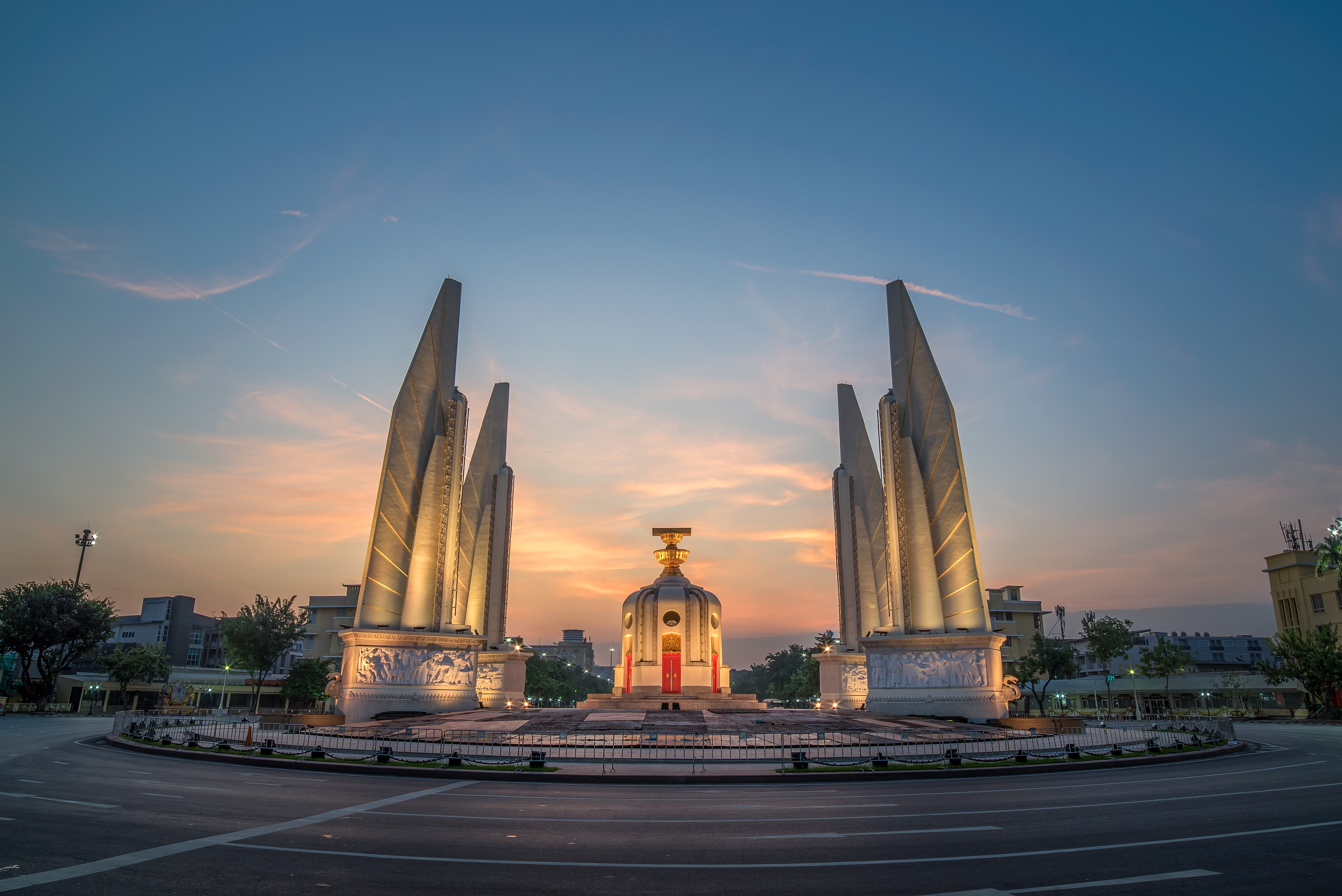
- The Democracy Monument in 2019
- Interactive map of Democracy Monument อนุสาวรีย์ประชาธิปไตย
- 13°45′24″N 100°30′6″E
- Location: Bowon Niwet subdistrict, Phra Nakhon district, Bangkok, Thailand

History
- Built: 24 June 1939 (groundbreaking ceremony); July 1939 (construction began) 24 June 1940 (opening ceremony)
- Built for: Commemoration of the Siamese revolution
- Events: 1973 popular uprising; 6 October 1976 massacre; Black May; 2010 political protests; 2013–2014 political crisis; 2020–2021 protests

Site notes
- Height: 24 meters (79 ft) (wing height)
- Architect: Mom Luang Phum Malakul
- Architectural styles: Art Deco, Khana Ratsadon architecture
- Governing body: Fine Arts Department

The Democracy Monument (Thai: อนุสาวรีย์ประชาธิปไตย, romanized: Anusawari Prachathipatai) is a public monument in the city centre of Bangkok, capital of Thailand. It occupies a traffic circle on the wide east–west Ratchadamnoen Avenue, at the intersection of Dinso Road. The monument is roughly halfway between Sanam Luang, the former royal cremation ground in front of Wat Phra Kaew, and the temple of the Golden Mount (Phu Kao Thong).

Once completed, Democracy Monument MRT station on MRT Purple Line and MRT Orange Line will serve the area.

== Commissioning ==
The monument was commissioned in 1939 to commemorate the 1932 Siamese coup d'état (also called "Siamese Revolution of 1932" or just "1932 Revolution") which led to the establishment of a constitutional monarchy in what was then the Kingdom of Siam, by its military ruler, Field Marshal Plaek Phibunsongkhram. Phibun saw the monument as the focal point of what he envisaged as a new, Westernized Bangkok, "making Thanon [road] Ratchadamnoen the Champs-Élysées and the Democracy Monument the Arc de Triomphe" of Bangkok.

== Design ==
The monument was designed by Chitrasen Aphaiwong, an architect whose brother, Khuang Aphaiwong, was a leading member of Phibun's government. The Italian sculptor Corrado Feroci, who became a Thai citizen and used the Thai name Silpa Bhirasi from the Second World War on, initially to avoid Japanese military ire, executed the relief sculptures around the base of the monument. He also provided the main sculpting for the renowned Lady Mo monument in the northeast Thailand city of Nakhon Ratchasima.

The building of the monument was highly unpopular at the time. Local residents and shopkeepers (mostly Chinese) were evicted from their homes and businesses with 60 days' notice. The widening of Ratchadamnoen Road to create a ceremonial boulevard involved cutting down hundreds of shade trees, a serious matter in the days before air conditioning, given Bangkok's torrid climate.

It was built by Christiani & Nielsen.

=== Design elements ===
The focal point of the monument (Figure 1 below) is a carved representation of a palm-leaf manuscript box holding the Thai Constitution of 1932, on top of two golden offering bowls above a round turret. The constitution is symbolically guarded by four wing-like structures (Figure 2 below), representing the four branches of the Thai armed forces—army, navy, air force and police—which carried out the 1932 coup.

The wings are 24 meters (79 ft) high, and this is also the radius of the base of the monument, marking the fact that the 1932 coup took place on 24 June. The central turret is 3 meters (9.8 ft) high, representing the month of June, which is the third month of the traditional Thai calendar. There were originally 75 small cannon around the outer ring of the monument, representing the year of the coup, 2475 in the Buddhist calendar. The six gates of the turret represent the six proclaimed policies of the People Party: "independence, internal peace, equality, freedom, economy, and education."

Facing outwards from the base of two of the wings are fountains (Figure 3 below) in the form of naga, the protective snake creatures of Hindu and Buddhist mythology, although the sculptures resemble Western dragons more than traditional naga sculptures. (Compare Figure 3 below with the image at the Naga article.)

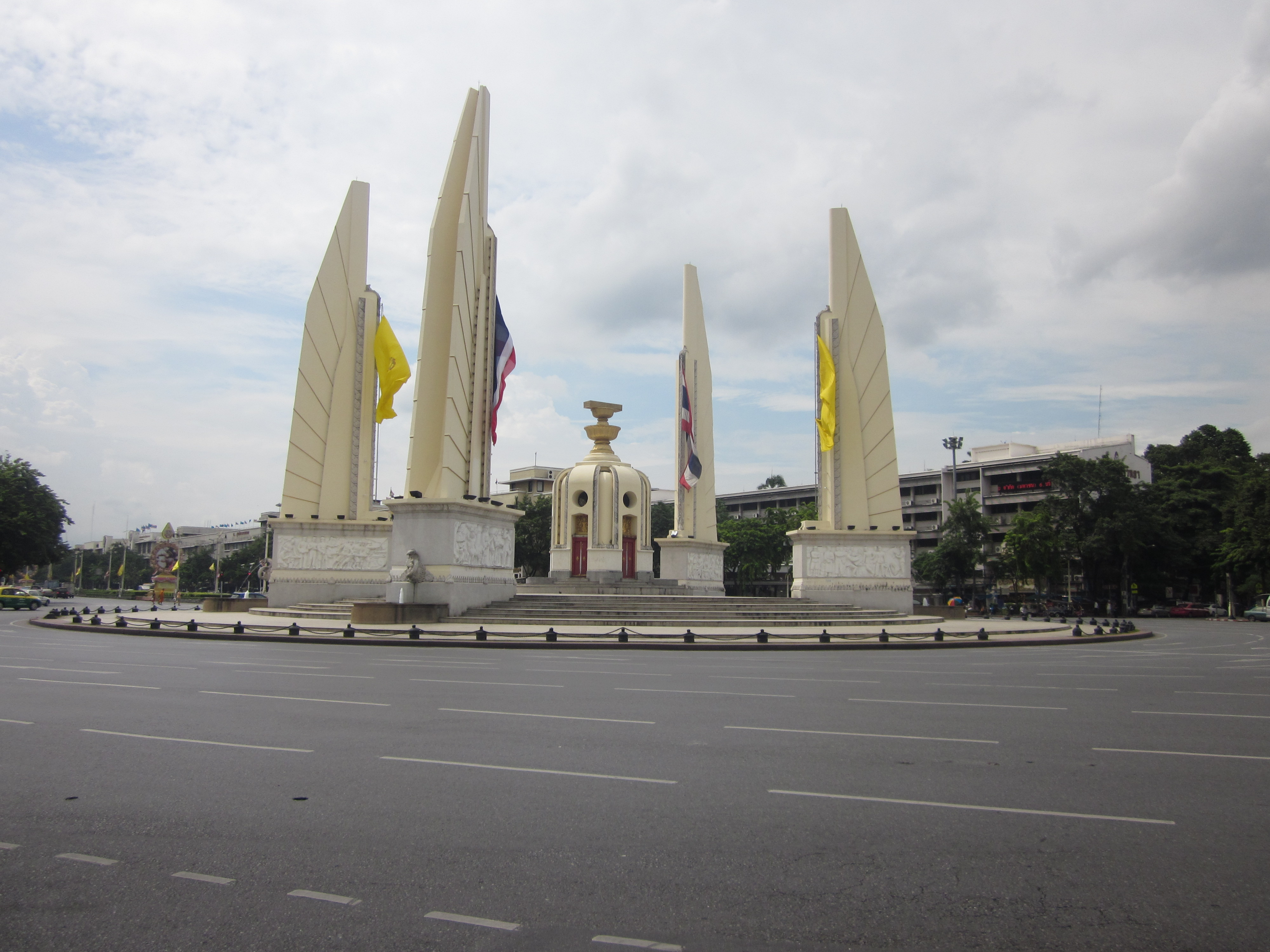
The Monument of Democracy, Bangkok

The relief sculptures at the base of the monument are propagandistic in their design. They depict the armed forces both as champions of democracy and as the personification of the Thai people. In the version of events depicted in these sculptures, the coup of 1932 was carried out by a united and idealistic Thai armed forces on behalf of the people, and had both the intention and effect of making Thailand a democracy. In the reliefs, civilians appear only as the grateful recipients of the heroism and benevolence of the armed forces.

The panel titled "Soldiers Fighting for Democracy" (Figure 4 below), shows a heroic and united armed forces doing battle (it is not clear against whom) for "democracy". The panel titled "Personification of the People" (Figure 5 below), shows a soldier protecting the Thai people while they go about their civil pursuits. The mother with child at left is the only woman depicted anywhere at the Democracy Monument. The panel represents the view of the military regime in 1939 that the armed forces were ruling on behalf of the people.

The panel titled "Personification of Balance and Good Life" (Figure 6 below), represents the social ideology of the military regime. An allegorical figure representing the nation, seated in a Buddha-like posture (but not Buddha himself), holding a sword and a set of scales, representing the armed forces and justice respectively, sits in its center, flanked by figures representing (from left) sport, education, religion, and the arts. The figure of "sport", a naked man with a shot put, is wholly European in origin.

=== Details ===
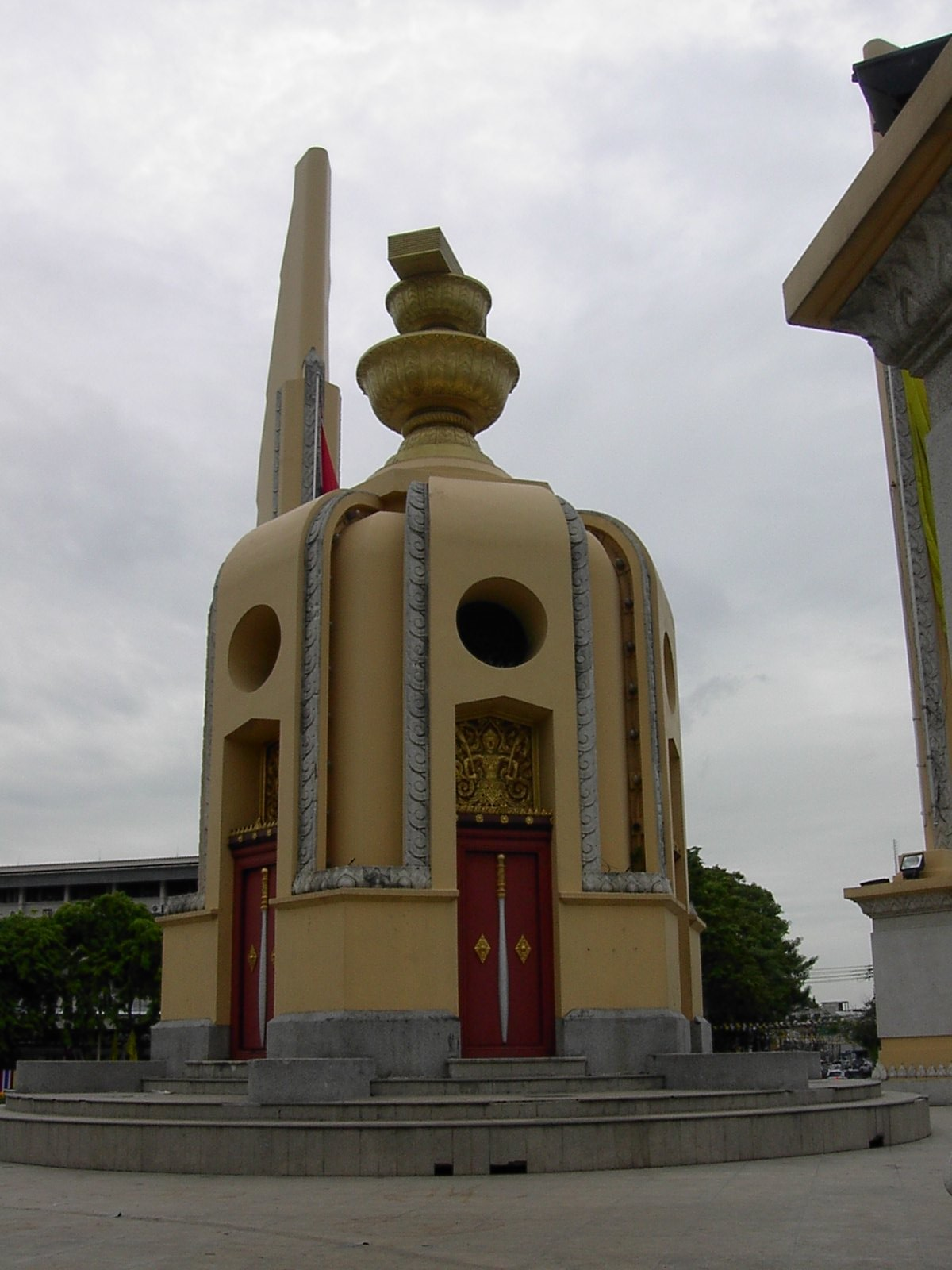
Figure 1: A representation of box holding the Thai Constitution of 1932 sits on top of two golden offering bowls above a round turret.

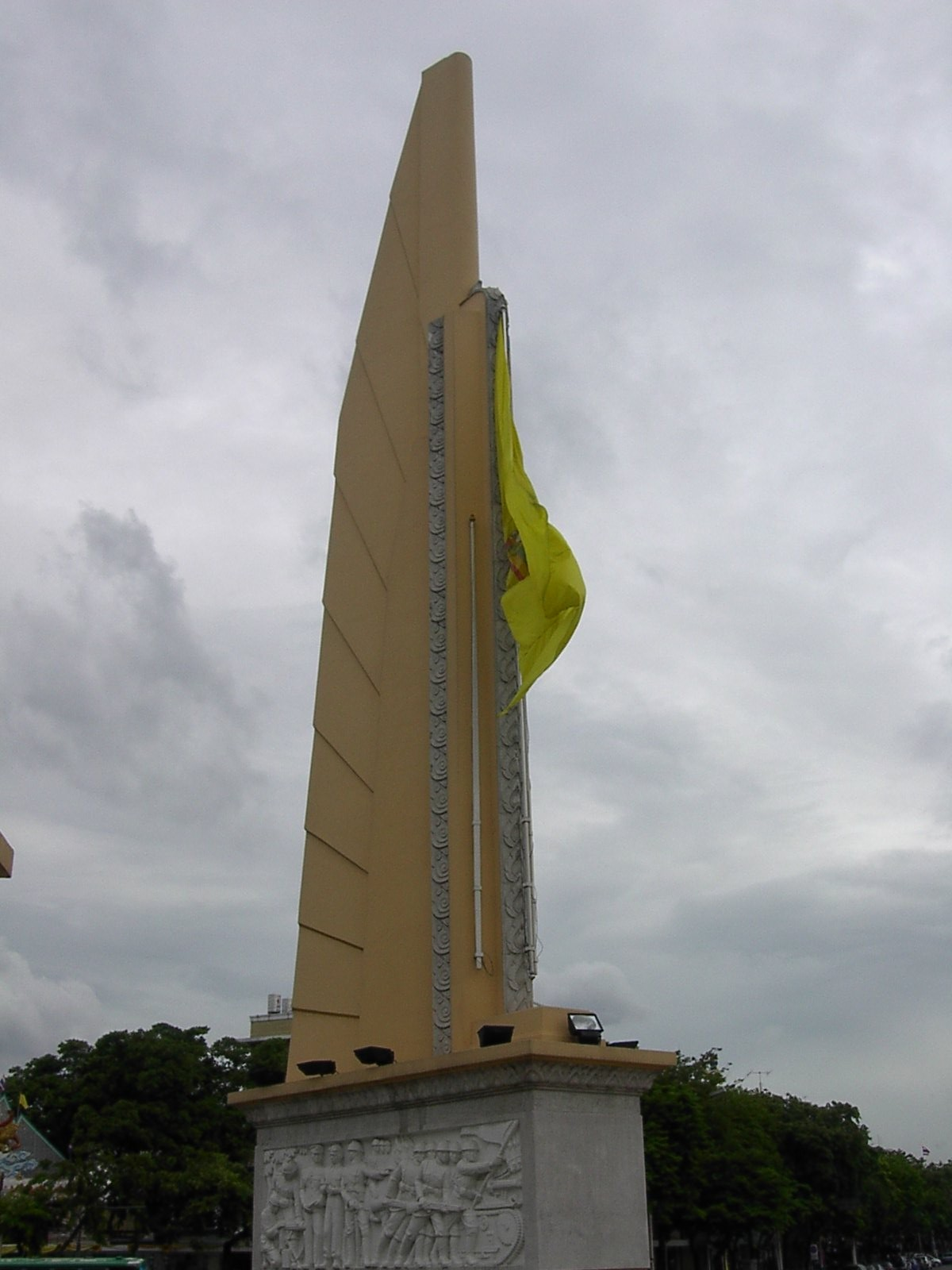
Figure 2: One of the four wing-like structures which guard the Constitution, representing the four branches of the Thai armed forces.

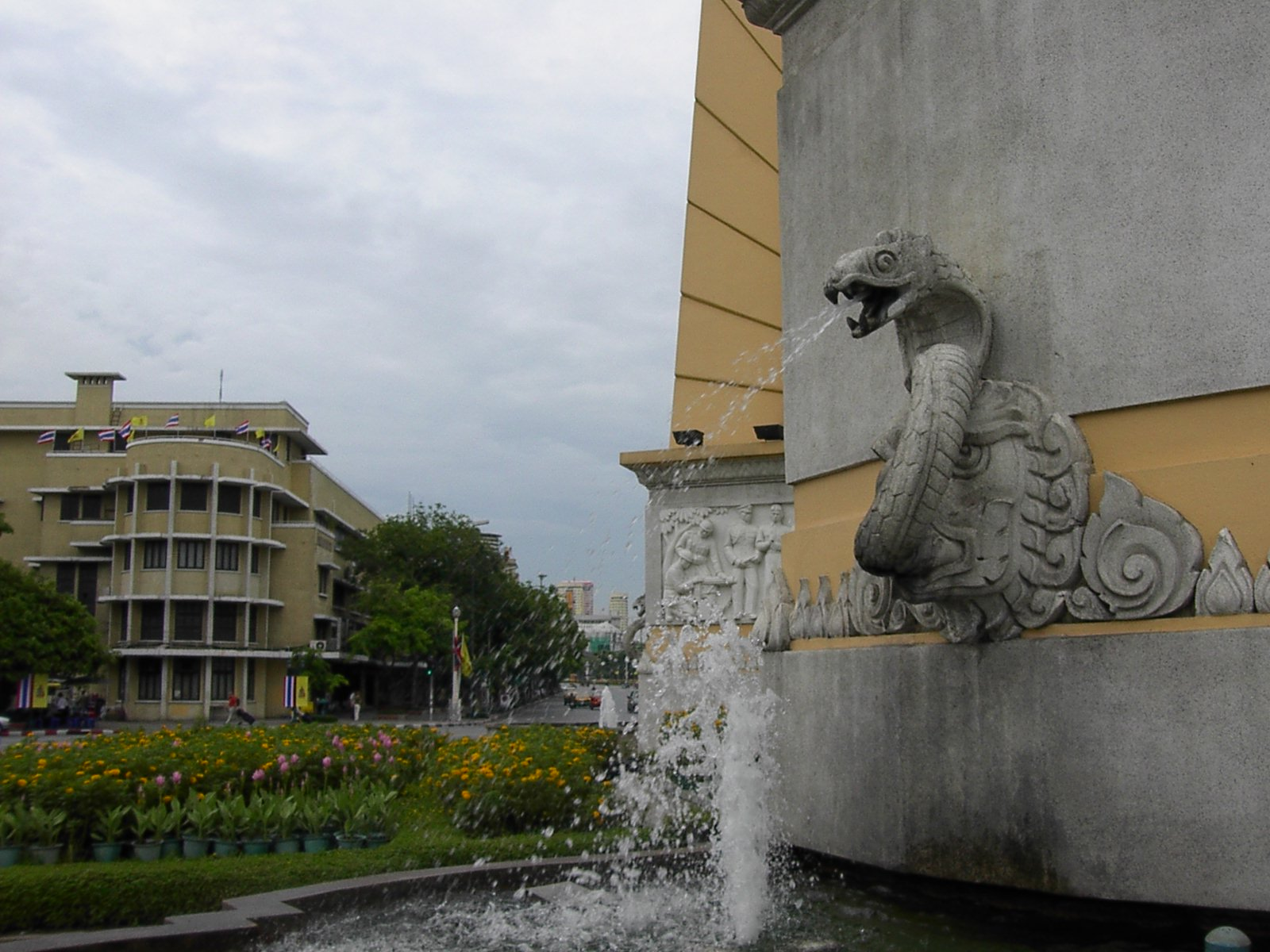
Figure 3: One of the naga fountains at the base of two of the wing structures.

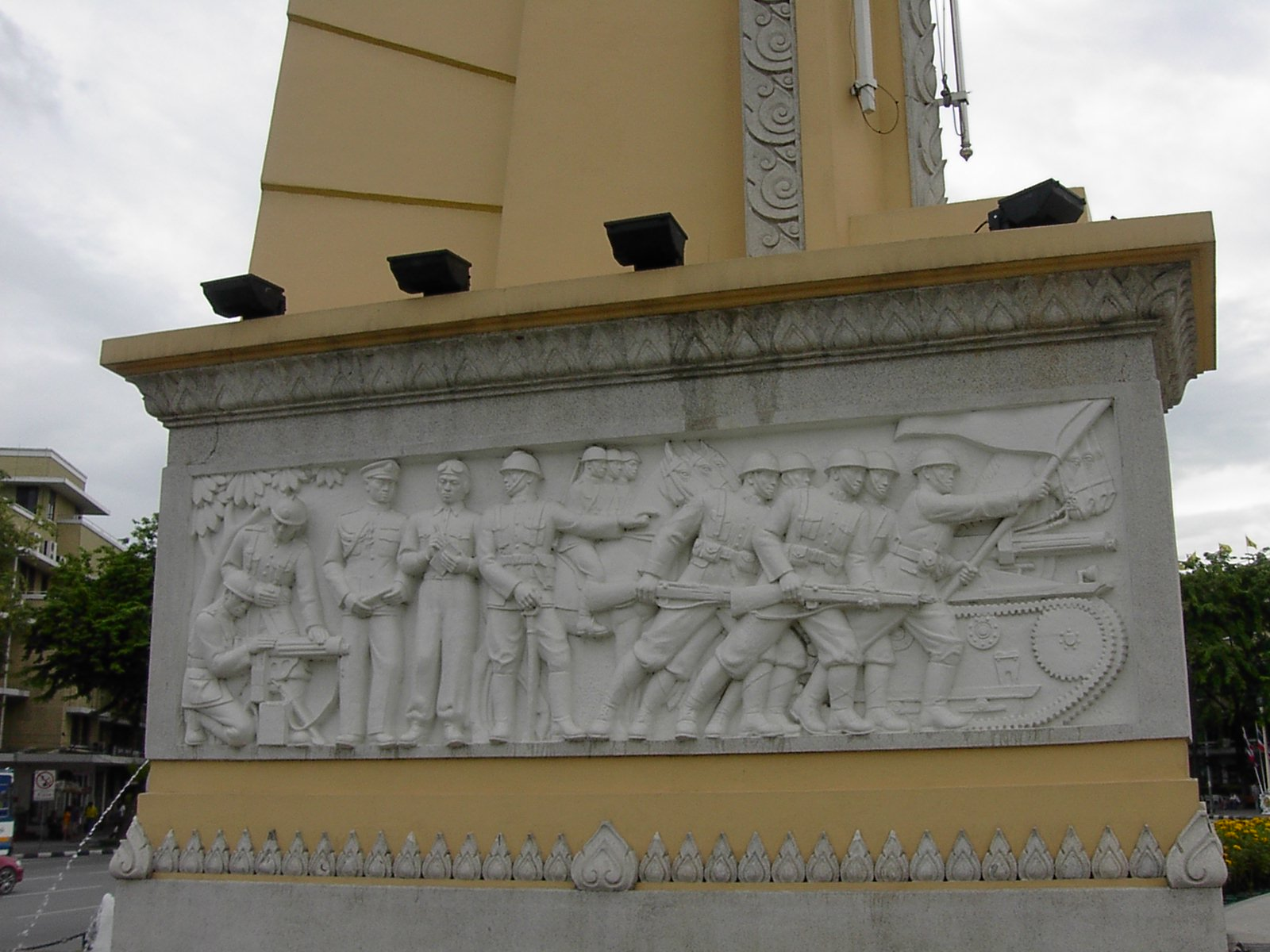
Figure 4: Sculptural panel titled "Soldiers Fighting for Democracy"

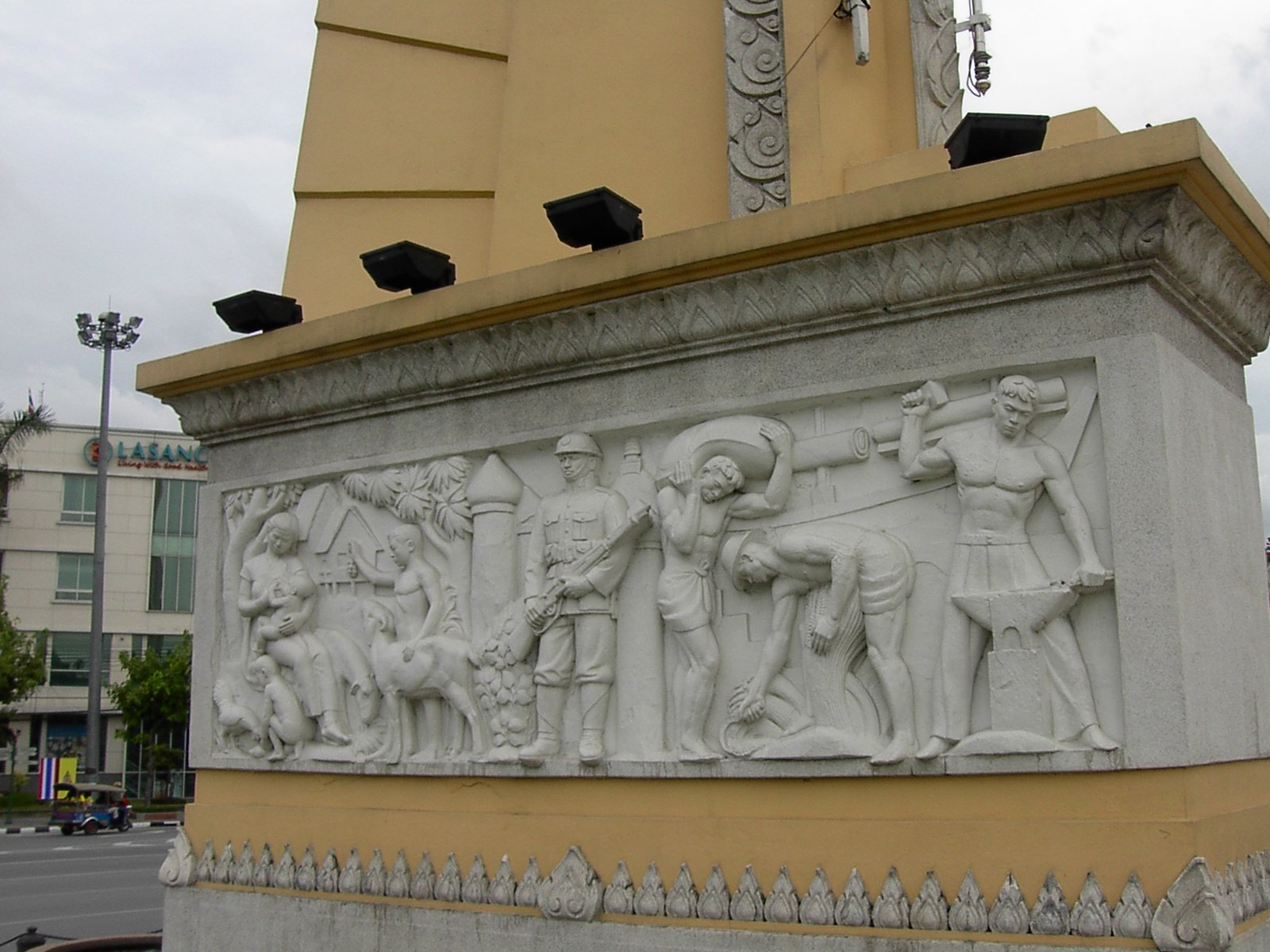
Figure 5: Sculptural panel titled "Personification of the People"

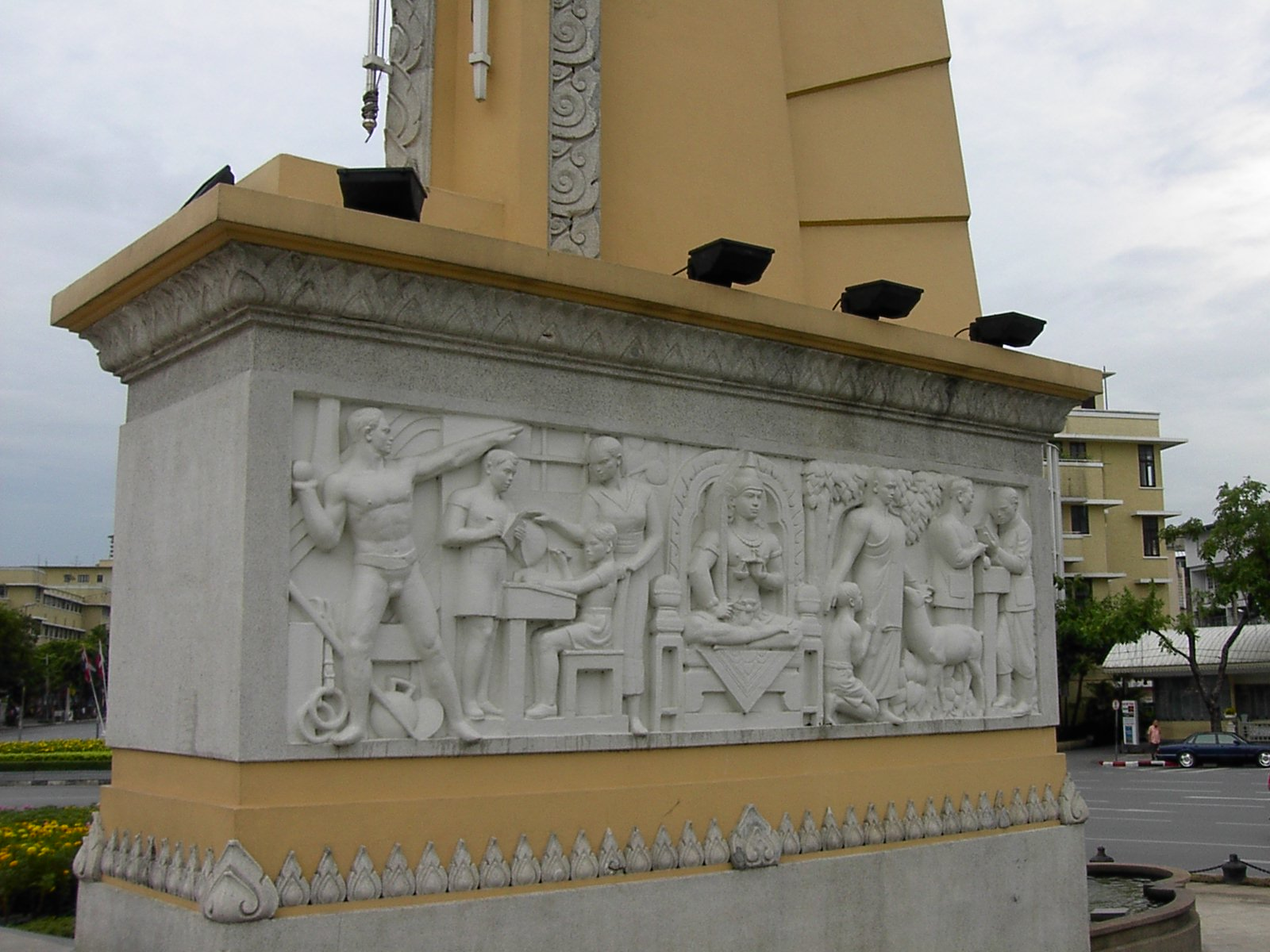
Figure 6: Sculptural panel titled "Personification of Balance and Good Life"

== Dictatorship ==
The story represented by these sculptures was a considerable distortion of the truth. In fact the 1932 coup was planned and executed almost without bloodshed by a small group of officers and some civilian collaborators, while the king was on holiday at the seaside. The coup was followed by the promulgation of Thailand's first constitution, but this was far from fully democratic. In the mid-1930s there was an attempt to progress to full democracy, but this broke down amid a split between the military and civilian elements of the government, and by 1939, when the Democracy Monument was built, Thailand was in effect a military dictatorship.

The most striking absence from the iconography of the Monument is the monarchy, which is nowadays the focal point of Thai national life and political culture. Although the military regime paid lip service to the monarchy, its political ideology (an ultimately incompatible mix of European liberal constitutionalism and military Bonapartism) was essentially republican. Prajadhipok's successor, Ananda Mahidol (Rama VIII) was at the time a schoolboy in Switzerland. Now that Thailand is (ostensibly) a democracy, very few Thais are aware of the propaganda content of the sculptural works at the base of the Democracy Monument; because the enormous growth in the volume of Bangkok's traffic, and the fact that pedestrian access to the traffic island on which it stands is all but impossible during periods of heavy traffic, it is difficult to observe the details of the Monument up close. There are now plans to build a tunnel under the roadway to allow better access (as has been done at the Berlin Victory Column, which is similarly located).

== Rallying point ==
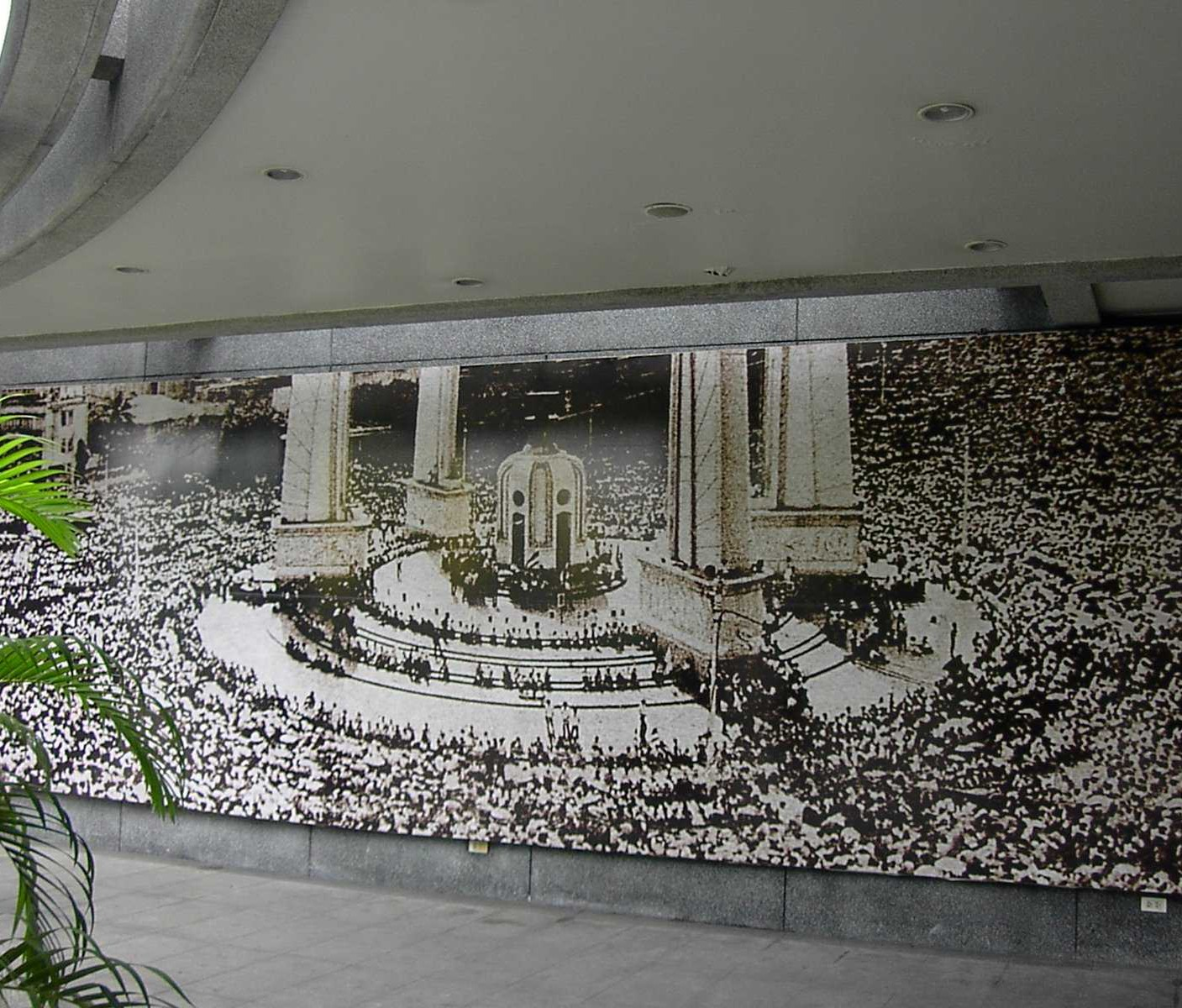
Crowds rally at the Democracy Monument in 1973 to protest against the military regime (display at the Memorial to 14 October 1973, Bangkok)

First fatality of October 14, 1973, incident being put atop the Democracy Monument

Despite the self-justifying intent of the Phibun regime in erecting a monument to its own seizure of power and calling it a monument to democracy, Democracy Monument's rather dubious origins are now largely forgotten, and it has served as a rallying point for later generations of democracy activists. It was the focus of the mass student demonstrations against Thanom Kittikachorn's military regime in the 1973 Thai popular uprising, and of the protests that triggered the 1976 military coup. During Black May (1992), scores of Thais were killed as they protested at the monument against General Suchinda Kraprayoon's regime. During the 2013–2014 Thai political crisis, the monument was a rally point for the People's Democratic Reform Committee led by Democrat MP Suthep Thaugsuban against Pheu Thai Prime Minister Yingluck Shinawatra. These events have given the monument a legitimacy it lacked for much of its history.

During the 2020 Thai protests, the monument again became a rallying point for protestors.

== Democracy Monument station ==
อนุสาวรีย์ประชาธิปไตย PP22 Democracy Monument OR05

General information
- Location: Phra Nakhon, Bangkok, Thailand
- Coordinates: 13°45′25.3″N 100°30′16.1″E
- System: | MRT MRT
- Owner: Mass Rapid Transit Authority of Thailand
- Operator: Bangkok Expressway and Metro Public Company Limited
- Line: Purple Line Orange Line
- Platforms: 4 (2 split platforms, 1 island platform)
- Tracks: 4

Construction
- Structure type: Underground
- Accessible: Yes

Other information
- Station code: PP22 OR05

History
- Opening: 2027; 1 year's time (Purple Line); 2030; 4 years' time (Orange line)
- Former names: Phan Fa

Services
| Preceding station | Metropolitan Rapid Transit | Following station |
Under construction
| Bang Khun Phrom towards Tao Poon | Purple Line Southern Extension | Sam Yot towards Khru Nai |
| Sanam Luang towards Taling Chan | Orange Line | Lan Luang towards Yaek Rom Klao |
Location

Democracy Monument station (Thai: สถานีอนุสาวรีย์ประชาธิปไตย) is an under construction MRT station in Phra Nakhon, Bangkok. It will be an interchange station of the Orange Line and Purple Line. The station will be located adjacent to Democracy Monument on Ratchadamnoen Avenue.

The station was previously named Phan Fa after the nearby bridge. The station's planned location has come under criticism from residents and conservationists over its potential impact on historic shophouses, some of which are over 80 years old. The Fine Arts Department's approval of the station is pending.
