= Phan Phiphop Lila Bridge =

Phan Phiphop Lila Bridge สะพานผ่านพิภพลีลา
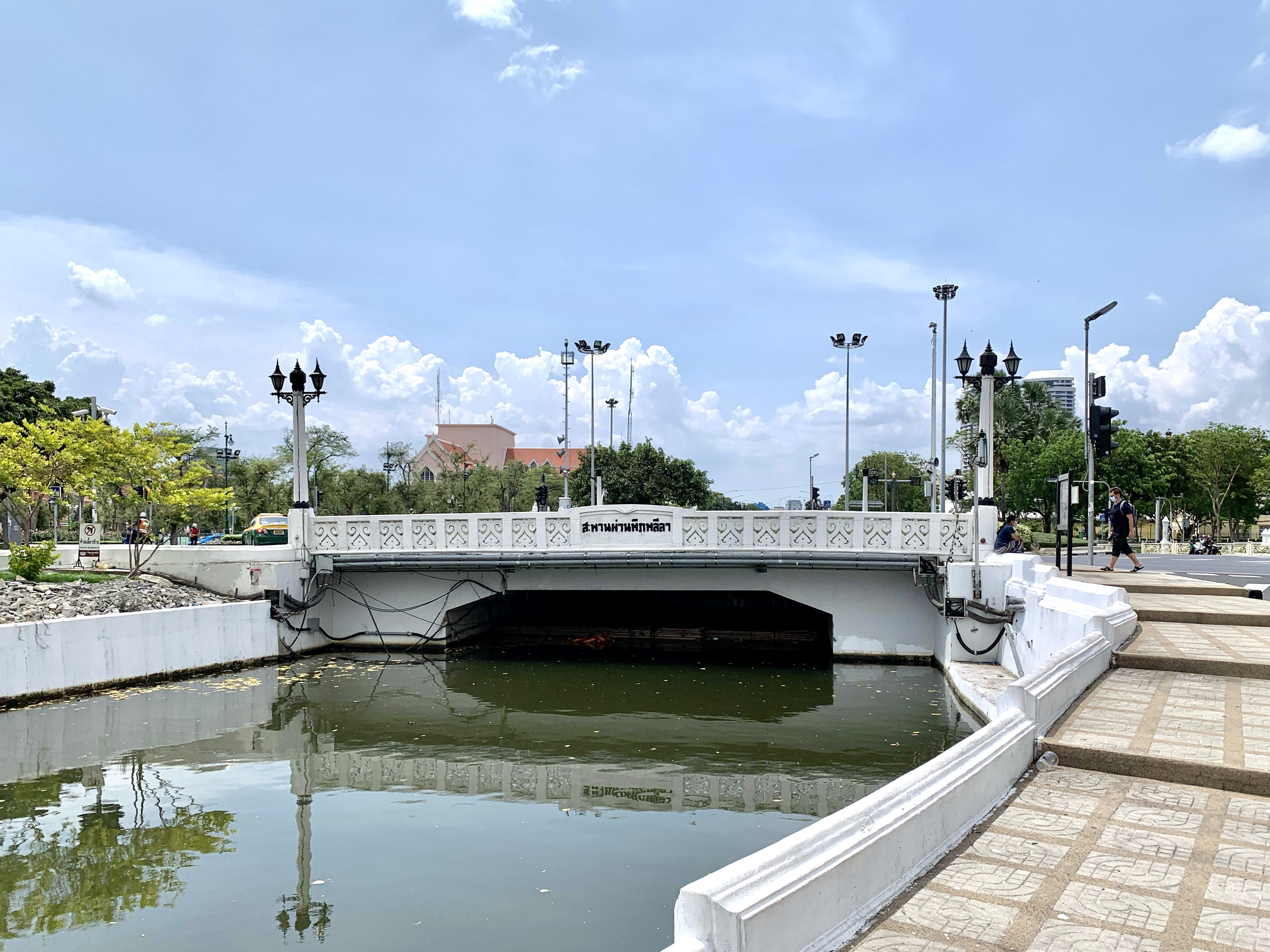
- Coordinates: 13°45′25″N 100°29′43″E
- Crosses: Khlong Khu Mueang Doem
- Locale: Bangkok, Thailand
- Official name: Phan Phiphop Lila Bridge

History
- Opened: 15 November 1904

Location
- Interactive map of Phan Phiphop Lila Bridge

Phan Phiphop Lila Bridge (Thai: สะพานผ่านพิภพลีลา, RTGS: Saphan Phan Phiphop Lila, pronounced [sā.pʰāːn pʰàːn pʰí(ʔ).pʰóp līː.lāː]; lit. 'King's Cross Bridge')^{[a]} is a bridge across Khlong Khu Mueang Doem (คลองคูเมืองเดิม), or old moat, in Phra Nakhon District, Bangkok. The bridge connects Thanon Ratchadamnoen Nai (Inner Ratchadamnoen Road) with Thanon Ratchadamnoen Klang (Central Ratchadamnoen Road).

Following the construction of Makkhawan Rangsan Bridge (สะพานมัฆวานรังสรรค์; lit. 'Bridge by the God Indra') in 1809, the construction of Phan Phiphop Lila Bridge began in 1902 at the command of King Chulalongkorn who desired to have an elegant bridge connected with the newly built Thanon Ratchadamnoen Nai. Construction was completed in 1904. King Chulalongkorn presided over the opening ceremony on 15 November 1904, at which time the name "Phan Phiphop Lila" was also declared.

The bridge was originally decorated with attractive wrought iron railings, but these were moved when the bridge was enlarged in 1941 to a pedestrian bridge crossing the northern part of Khlong Khu Mueang Doem and located close to the intersection of Chakrabongse Road (Thai: ถนนจักรพงษ์) and Chao Fa Road (Thai: ถนนเจ้าฟ้า).

Phan Phiphop Lila Bridge has a sister bridge, Phan Fa Lilat Bridge (สะพานผ่านฟ้าลีลาศ; lit. 'King's Cross Bridge'.^{[b]})

== See also ==
- Phan Fa Lilat Bridge
- Makkhawan Rangsan Bridge
- Chalerm Sawan 58 Bridge
- Phra Pin-klao Bridge

== Notes ==
^{a} The northern part of "Khlong Khu Mueang Doem" was formerly known as "Khlong Rongmai" (คลองโรงไหม). "Khlong Khu Mueang Doem" is also called popularly "Khlong Lord" (คลองหลอด). ^{b} Both the names "Phan Phiphop Lila" and "Phan Fa Lilat" mean a 'king's cross', 'king's walk', or 'king's movement'. But, literally, "Phan Phiphop Lila" means '[the bridge on which] the Ruler of the Universe gracefully walks' and "Phan Fa Lilat" means '[the bridge on which] the Lord of Heaven majestically walks'.
