= Phan Fa Lilat Bridge =

Historic bridge in central Bangkok, Thailand

Phan Fa Lilat Bridge สะพานผ่านฟ้าลีลาศ
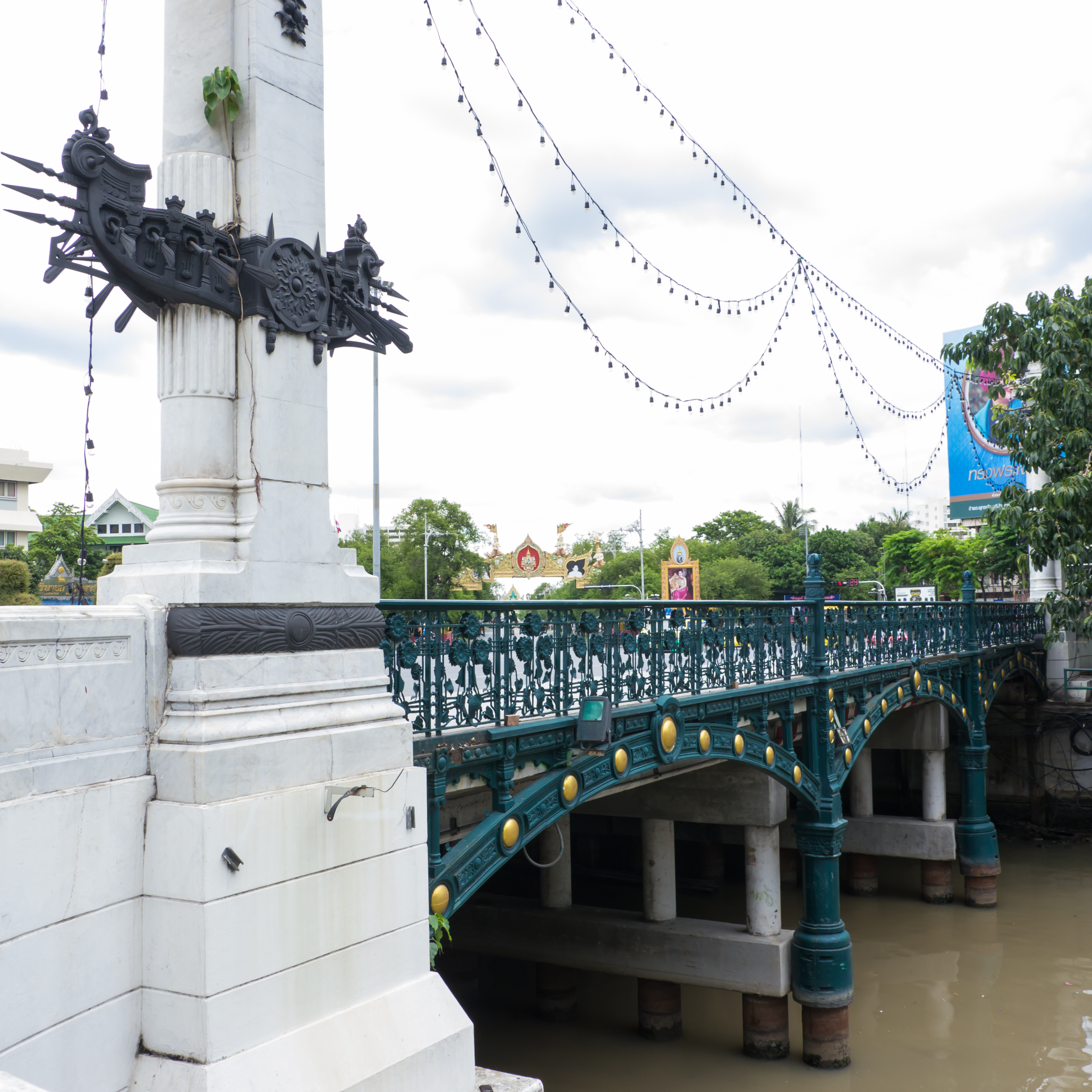
- Side of the Bridge
- Coordinates: 13°45′22.79″N 100°30′21.25″E
- Carries: Ratchadamnoen Avenue
- Crosses: Khlong Bang Lamphu
- Locale: Ban Phan Thom, Bowon Niwet Sub-Districts, Phra Nakhon District and Ban Bat Sub-district, Pom Prap Sattru Phai District
- Official name: Phan Fa Lilat Bridge
- Other name: Phan Fa Bridge
- Maintained by: Bangkok Metropolitan Administration (BMA)

History
- Opened: Unknown

Location
- Interactive map of Phan Fa Lilat Bridge

Phan Fa Lilat Bridge (Thai: สะพานผ่านฟ้าลีลาศ, RTGS: Saphan Phan Fa Lilat, pronounced [sā.pʰāːn pʰàːn fáː līː.lâːt]; lit. 'the bridge where the king passes through the heavens', referring to "King's Cross Bridge"; commonly known as "Phan Fa Bridge") is a historic bridge crossing Khlong Bang Lamphu on Ratchadamnoen Avenue, at the boundary between Ban Phan Thom and Bowon Niwet sub-districts in Phra Nakhon District, and Ban Bat sub-district in Pom Prap Sattru Phai District, inner Bangkok. It is located near Mahakan Fort, Queen Sirikit Gallery, and the King Prajadhipok Museum. The bridge divides Ratchadamnoen Avenue into two sections: Ratchadamnoen Klang (ราชดำเนินกลาง, 'Central Ratchadamnoen') and Ratchadamnoen Nok (ราชดำเนินนอก, 'Outer Ratchadamnoen').

It is considered a pair with Phan Phiphop Lila Bridge (สะพานผ่านพิภพลีลา), which lies on Ratchadamnoen Nai (ราชดำเนินใน, 'Inner Ratchadamnoen') near the Royal Rattanakosin Hotel and Sanam Luang.

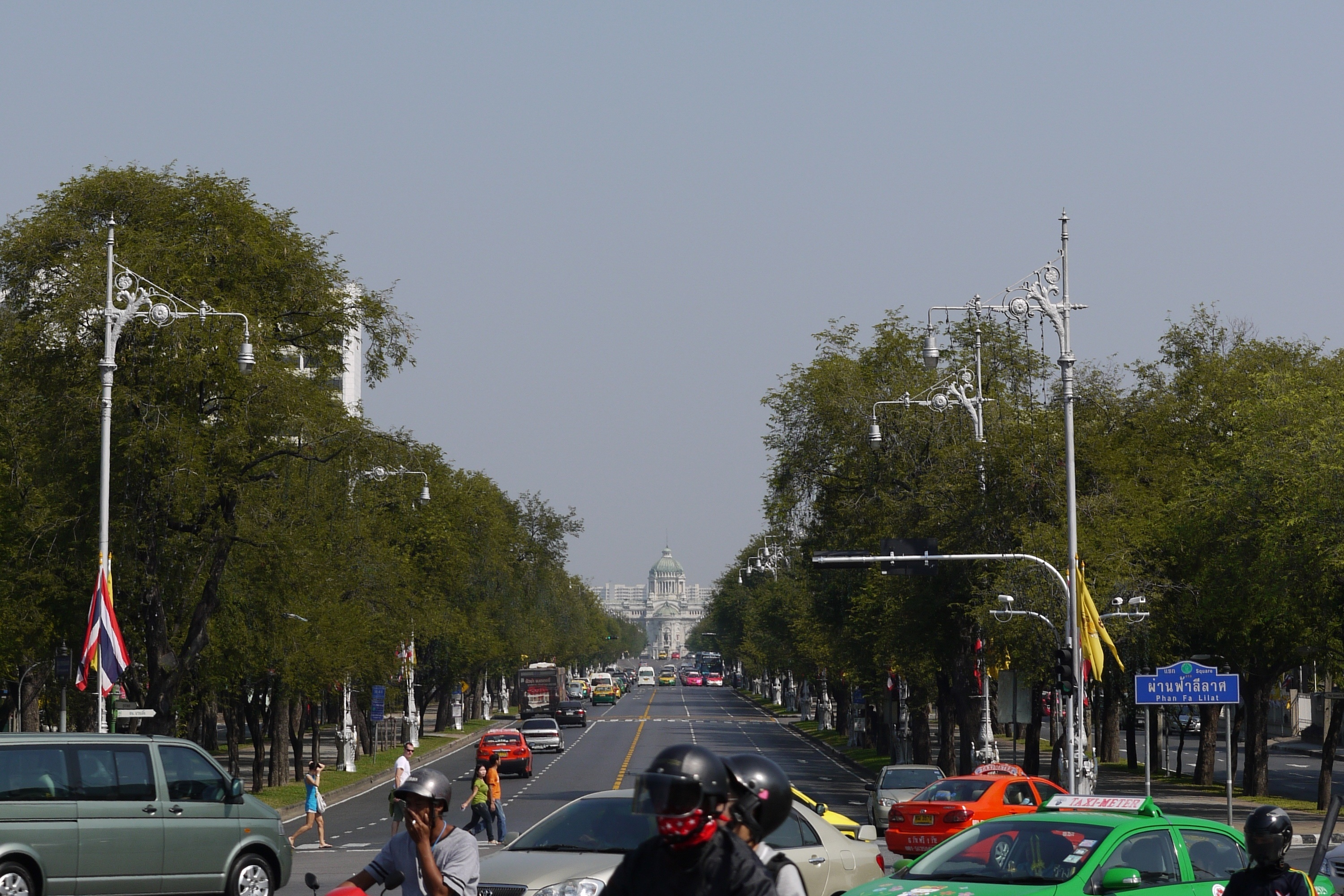
At the foot of the bridge, heading towards the Royal Plaza and the Ananta Samakhom Throne Hall on Ratchadamnoen Nok Avenue

The exact date of construction is unknown, but it is believed to have been built during the construction of Ratchadamnoen Avenue (1899–1901), under the reign of King Chulalongkorn (Rama V).

Due to its central location between the Democracy Monument and the Royal Plaza, the bridge has been a frequent site for major political gatherings in Thai history, including the October 14 uprising (1973), Black May (1992), and protests by the People's Alliance for Democracy (PAD) (2006 and 2008), the United Front for Democracy Against Dictatorship (UDD) (2009 and 2010), and the People's Democratic Reform Committee (PDRC) (2013–2014).

== See more ==
- Phan Phiphop Lila Bridge
- Makkhawan Rangsan Bridge
