= Ratchadamnoen Avenue =

Historic road in the districts of Phra Nakhon and Dusit in Bangkok, Thailand

Coordinates: 13.7571°N 100.5004°E

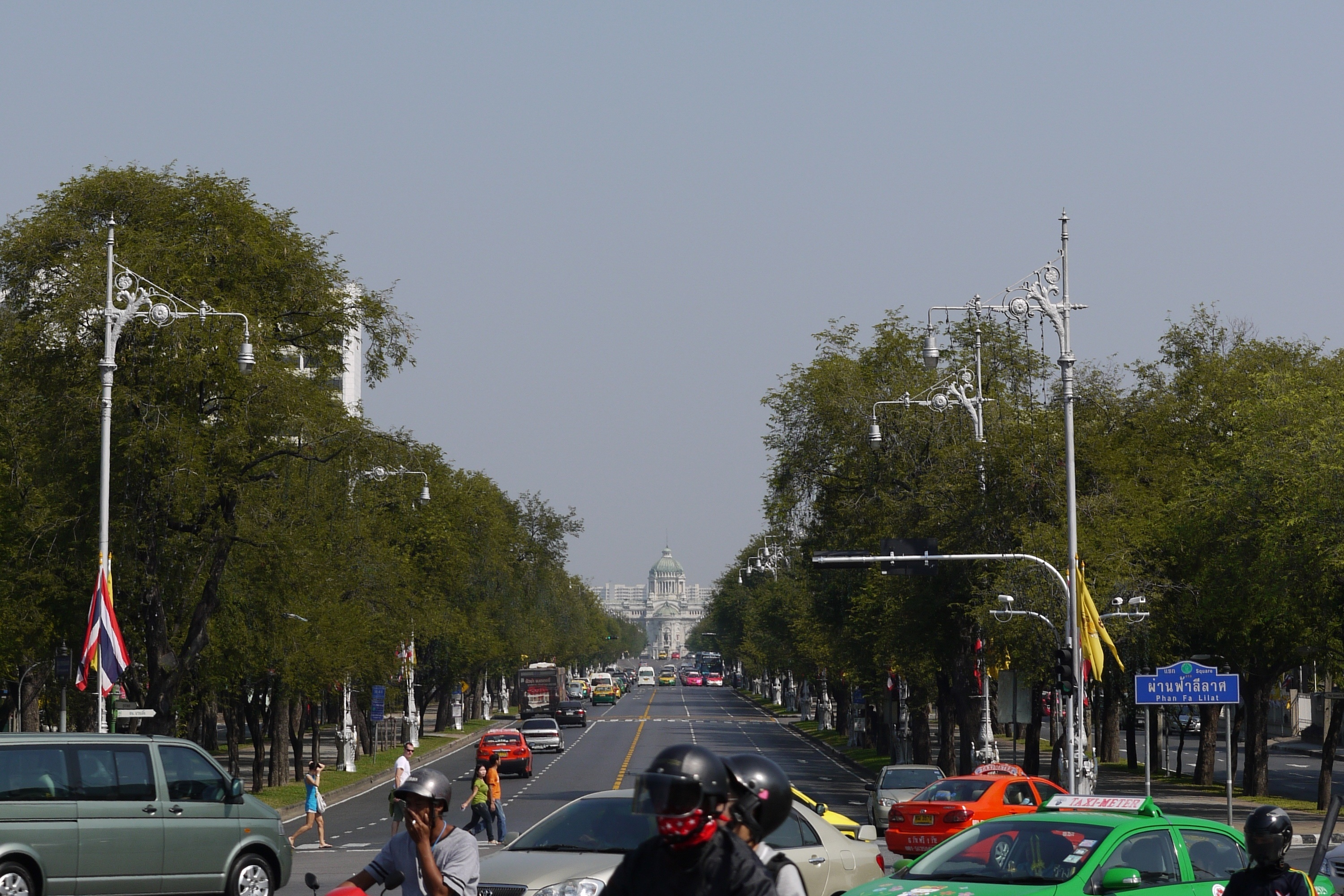
Ratchadamnoen Avenue looking north from Phan Fa Lilat Bridge. Ananta Samakhom Throne Hall is visible in the distance.

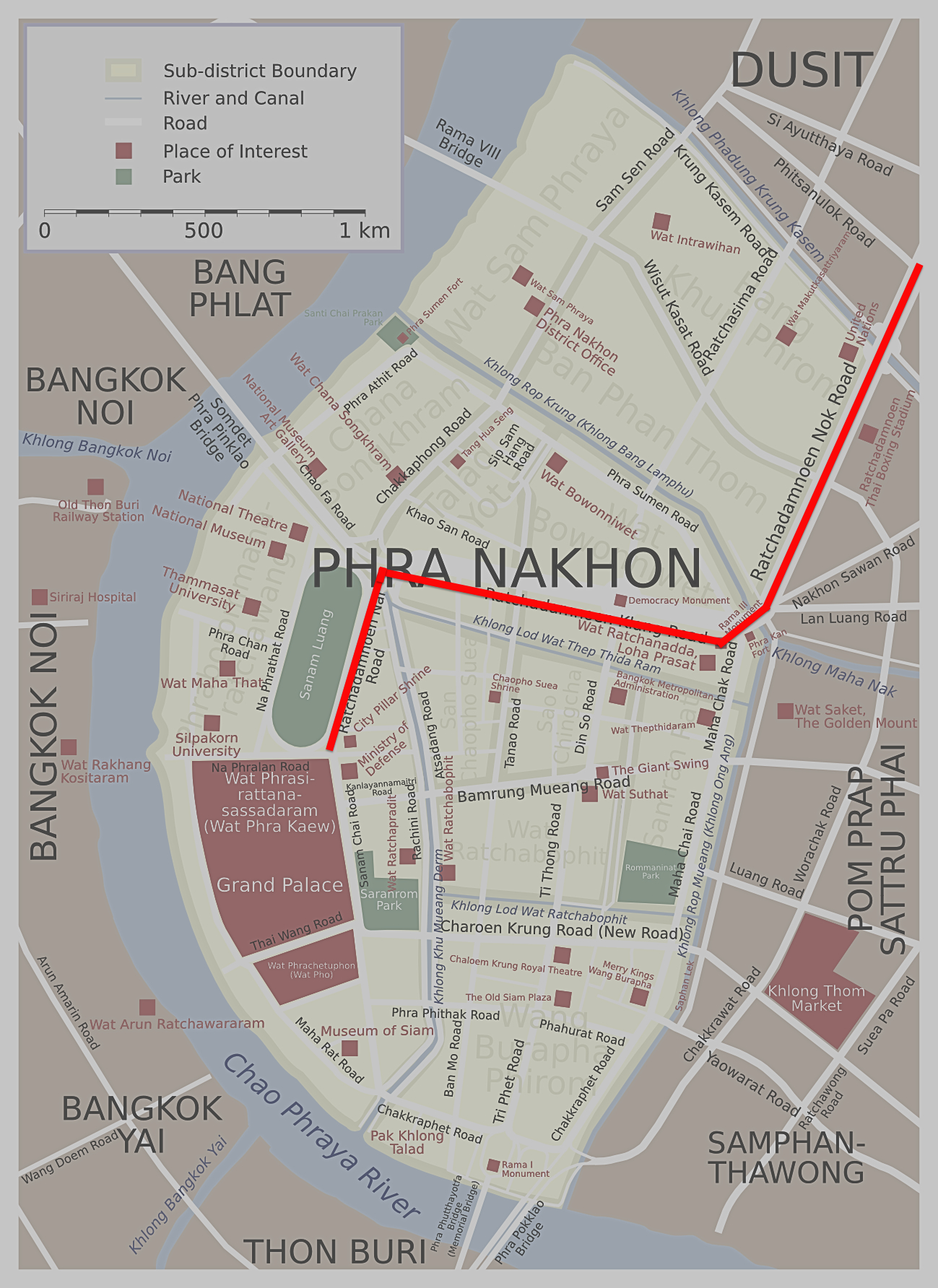
Ratchadamnoen Nai is the first segment on the left, along Sanam Luang, Ratchadamnoen Klang is the second segment (from west to east), and Ratchadamnoen Nok is the last on the right, to Dusit Palace

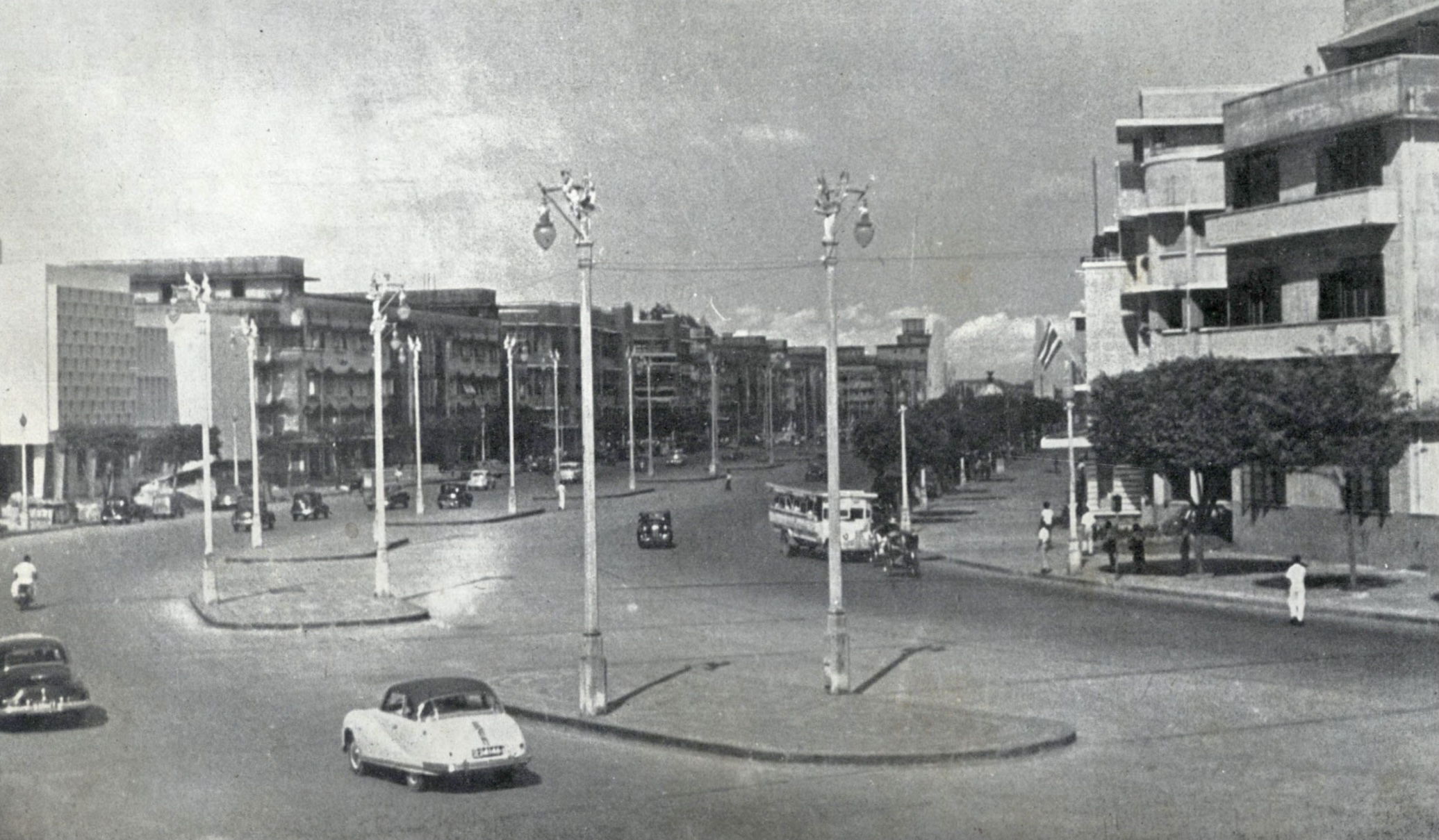
Ratchadamnoen Avenue in 1954.

Ratchadamnoen Avenue (Thai: ถนนราชดำเนิน, RTGS: Thanon Ratchadamnoen, pronounced [tʰā.nǒn râːt.tɕʰā.dām.nɤ̄ːn], also spelled Rajdamnern) is a historic road in the Phra Nakhon and Pom Prap Sattru Phai with Dusit Districts of Bangkok, Thailand. Ratchadamnoen Avenue may be the most politically charged thoroughfare in the capital, as its history captures the ebb and flow of Thai ideological struggles over Thai governance in the 20th and 21st centuries.

== History ==
Ratchadamnoen Avenue was commissioned by King Chulalongkorn following his first visit to Europe in 1897. Construction took place from 1899 to 1903. The road consists of three segments, named Ratchadamnoen Nai, Ratchadamnoen Klang, and Ratchadamnoen Nok (Inner, Middle, and Outer Ratchadamnoen, respectively). It links the Grand Palace to Dusit Palace in the new royal district, terminating at the Royal Plaza in front of the Ananta Samakhom Throne Hall. Inspired by the Champs-Élysées and other European boulevards, the King used the road as a route for grand royal parades (Ratchadamnoen literally means 'royal procession'), which served to project images of a modern monarchy.

Between 1939 and 1941, Ratchadamnoen Klang, the middle segment, was redeveloped upon a People's Party's initiative. The first task carried out in 1939 was the expropriation and demolition of existing properties within 40 metres along the boulevard, from Phan Phiphop Lila Bridge to Phan Fa Lilat Bridge. The only building to be left untouched was the former Badman and Co. department store which had then been converted into the Publicity Department. The double rows of mahogany trees and the pavement beneath them were replaced with a single row of central islands. On 24 June 1940, the Democracy Monument was inaugurated at the centre of the new boulevard which represented a new symbol of the People's Party. By 1941, ten multi-storied buildings had been erected and the new redeveloped Ratchadamnoen Klang Road was officially opened by officials on 24 June 1941. More buildings were added in the coming years, including the Royal Rattanakosin Hotel in 1942 and Sala Chaloem Thai in 1949. By redeveloping Ratchadamnoen Klang Road, the main objective of the People's Party was to leave its mark on the city and to distinguish itself from the monarchy by choosing the only segment of the road that does not have a palace at one of its extremities (i.e. the Grand Palace and the Ananta Samakhom Throne Hall).

The avenue has been the site of many demonstrations, including the 1973 student uprising as well as more recent political rallies, such as the protests and ensuing military crackdowns in 2009 and 2010, the latter of which led to over 20 deaths along Ratchadamnoen Klang.

In January 2020, it was announced that ten buildings flanking a 1.2 kilometre stretch of the avenue, owned by the Crown Property Bureau, would be renovated or demolished. The bureau proposes rebuilding the structures in "neoclassical-style", obliterating the Art Deco theme originally inspired by the spirit of the 1932 revolution that overthrew absolute monarchy.

== Description ==
Ratchadamnoen Nai Road begins at the northeast corner of the Grand Palace and leads northward to the Phan Phiphop Lila Bridge, which crosses the old city moat. The road then continues east as Ratchadamnoen Klang until it crosses Khlong Rop Krung (the outer moat of Rattanakosin Island) at Phan Fa Lilat Bridge, where it turns northward toward the Royal Plaza. Ratchadamnoen Nok, in particular, was designed to impart Western-style grandeur, with three carriageways with wide pavements lined by multiple rows of trees. It is bordered by government offices, including the Government House. The Democracy Monument sits in the centre of Ratchadamnoen Klang Road. Today, the avenue serves as a major thoroughfare bringing traffic into the old city centre and across Phra Pin-klao Bridge to the Thonburi side of the city.

== Gallery ==
Landmarks along Ratchadamnoen Avenue

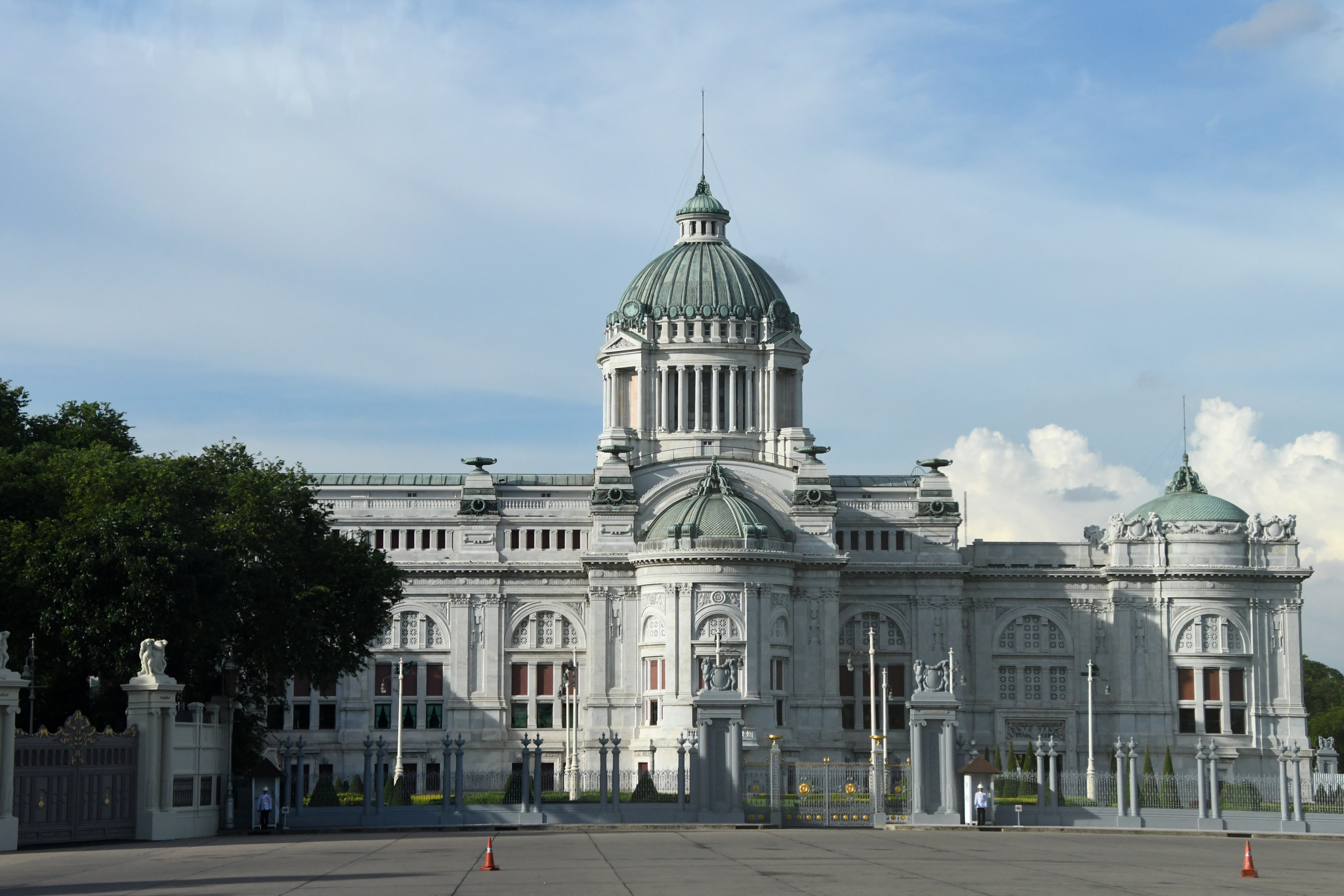
Ananta Samakhom Throne Hall

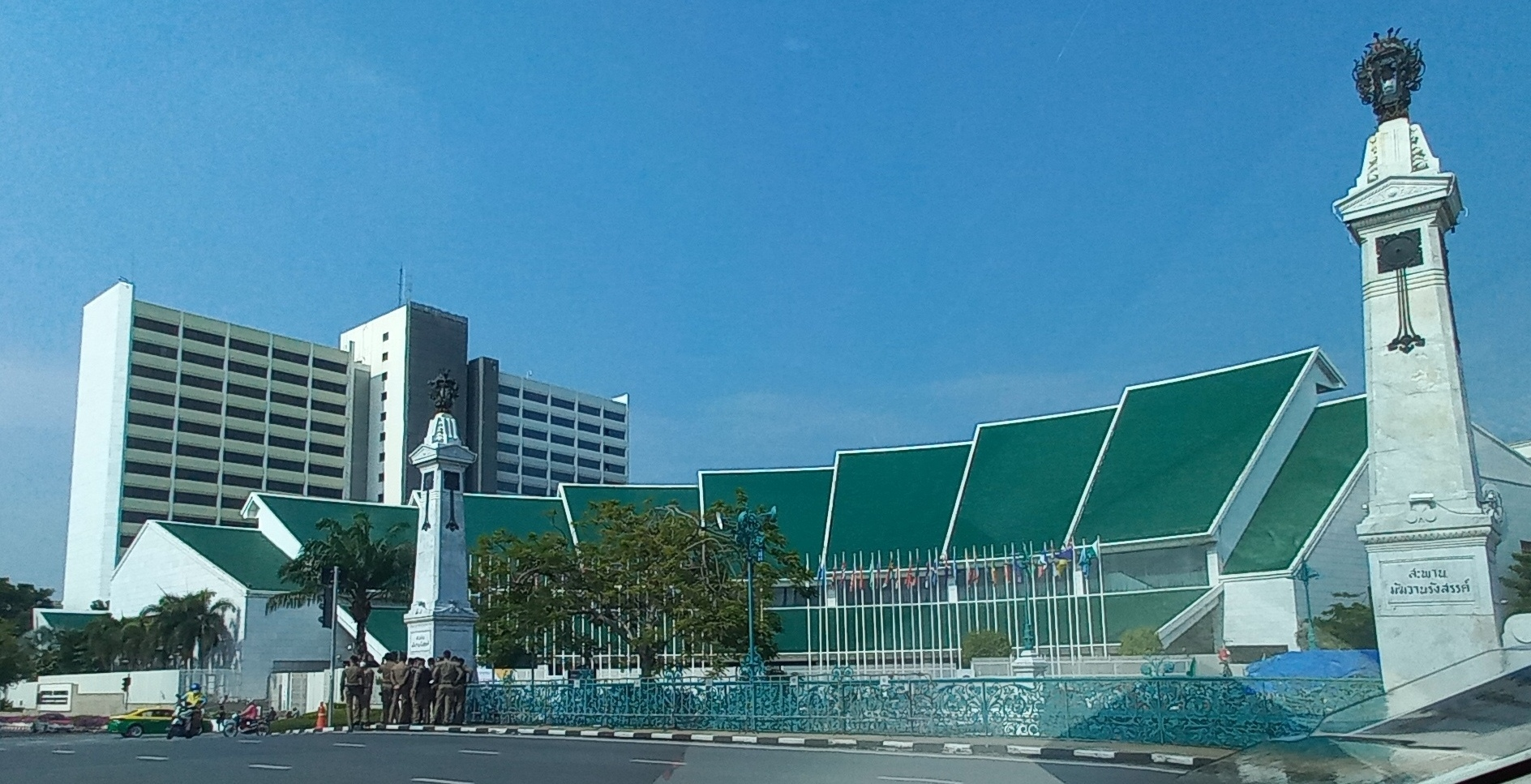
United Nations Building

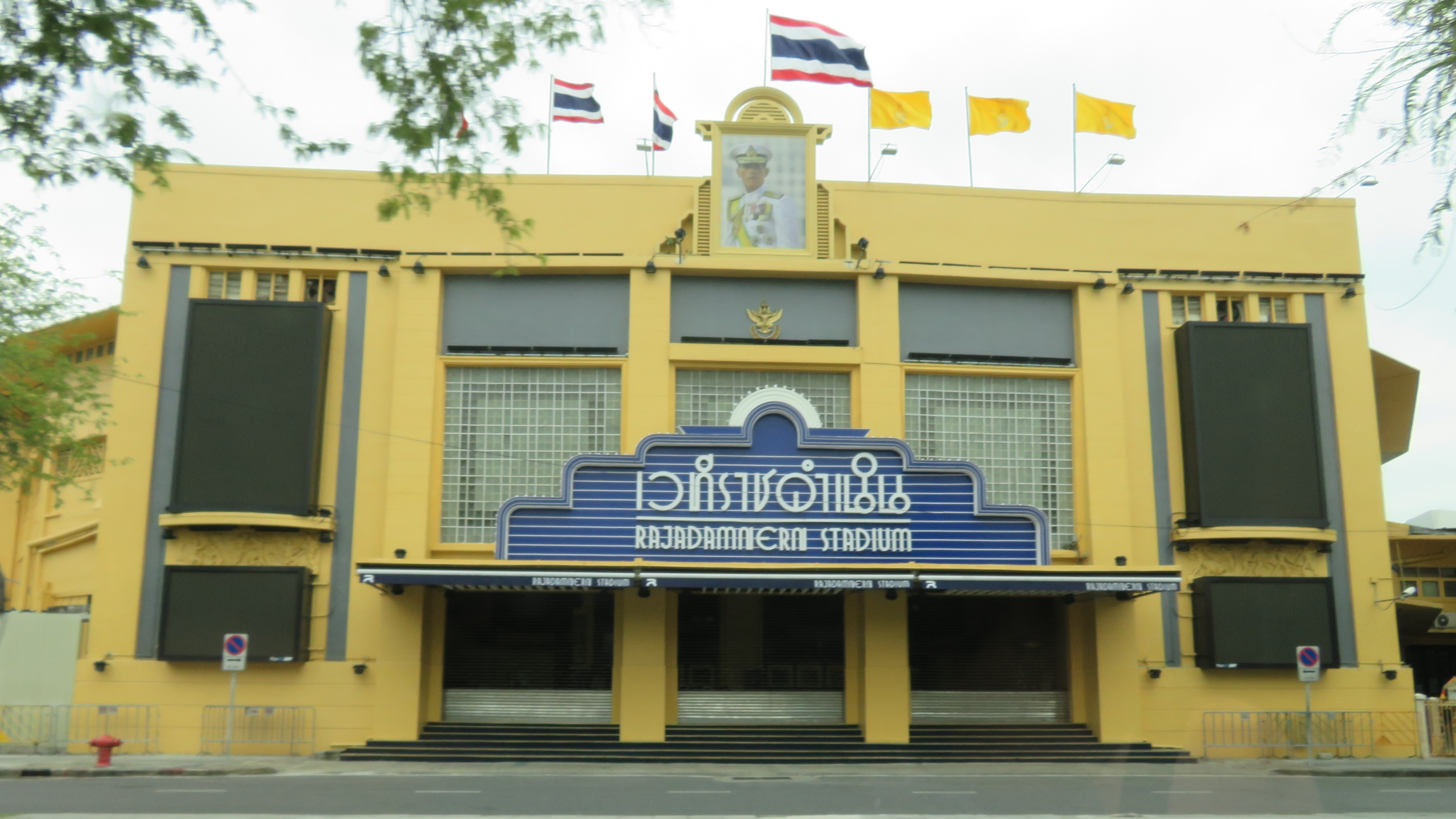
Rajadamnern Stadium

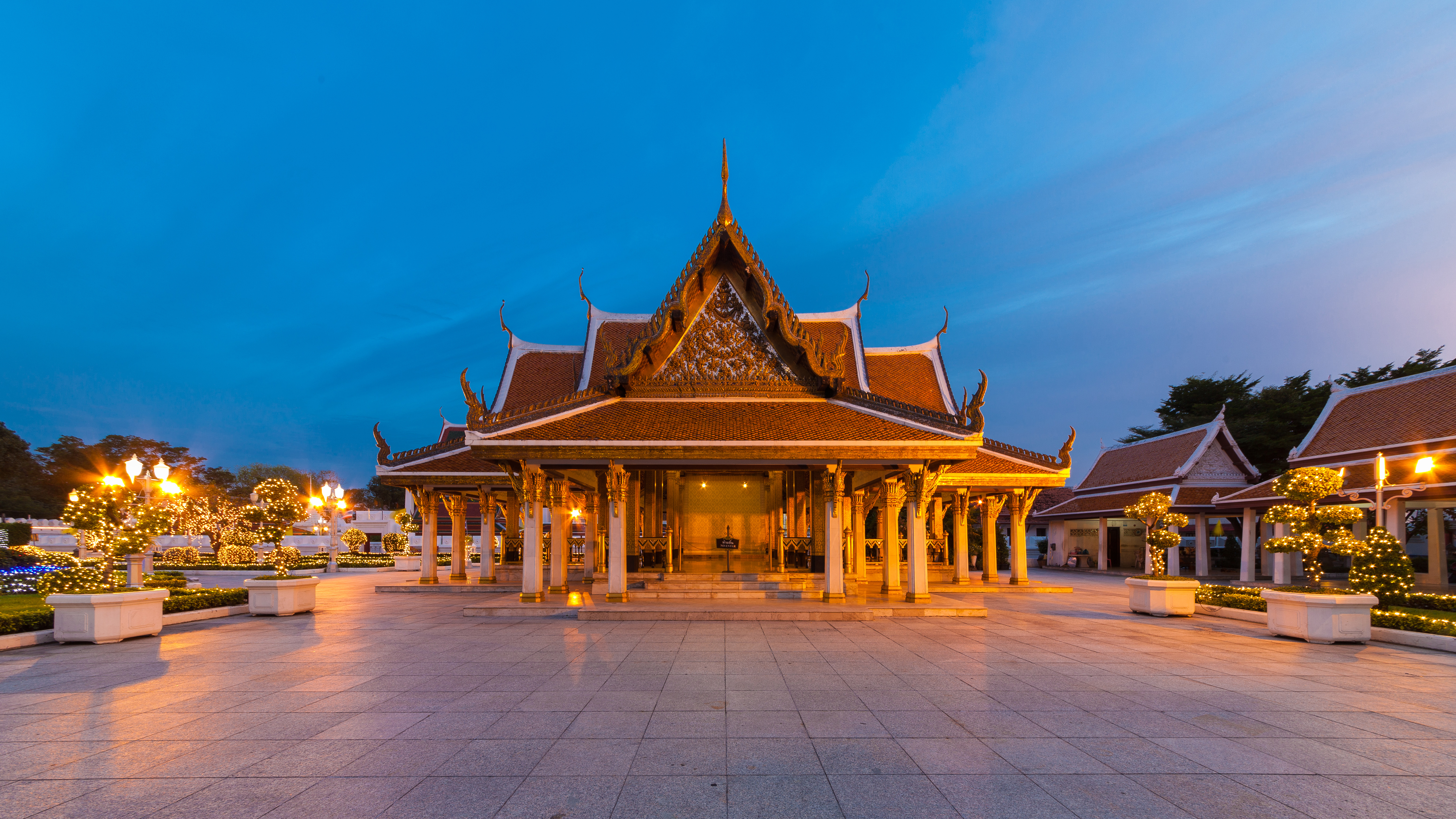
Maha Chetsadabodin Pavilion

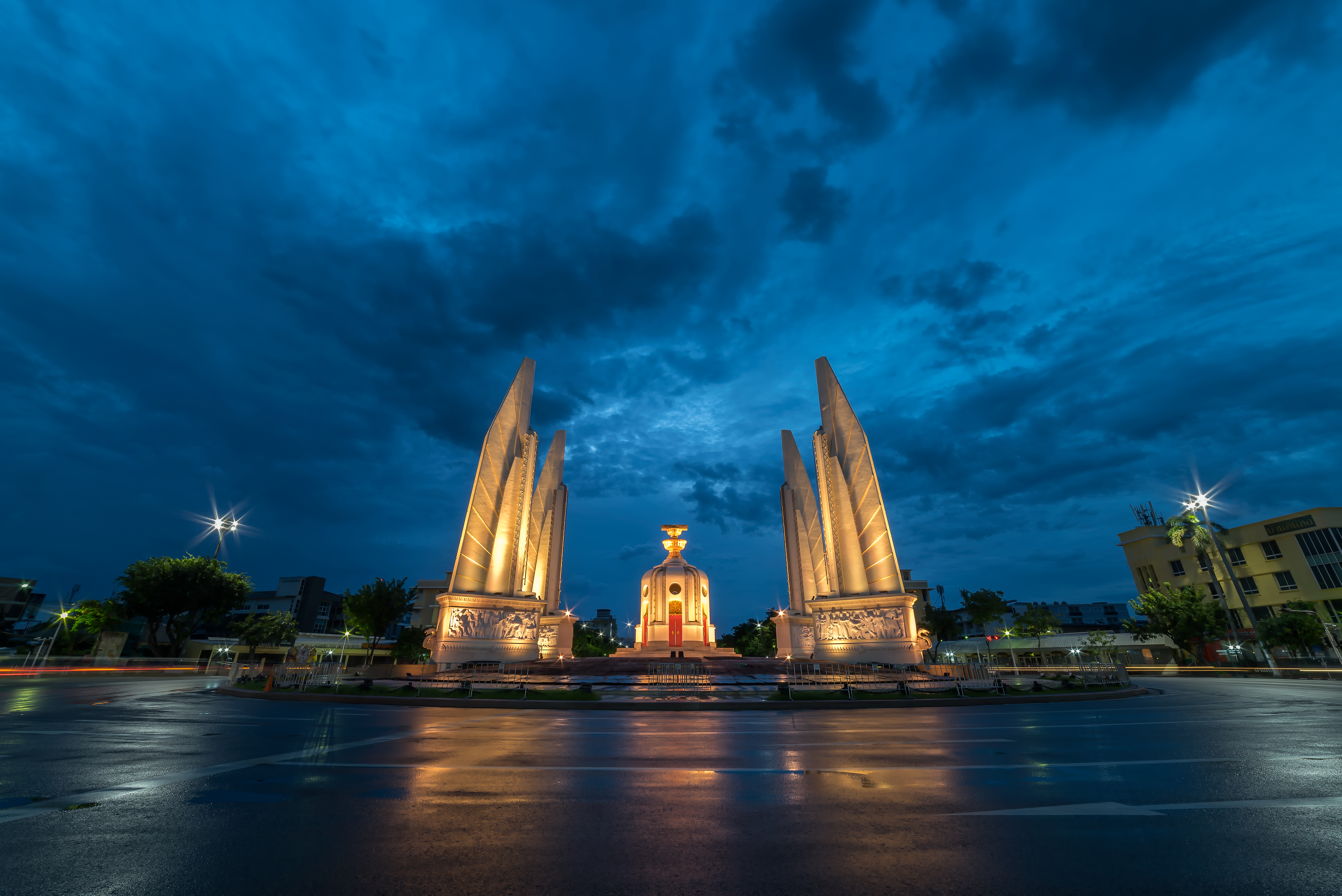
Democracy Monument

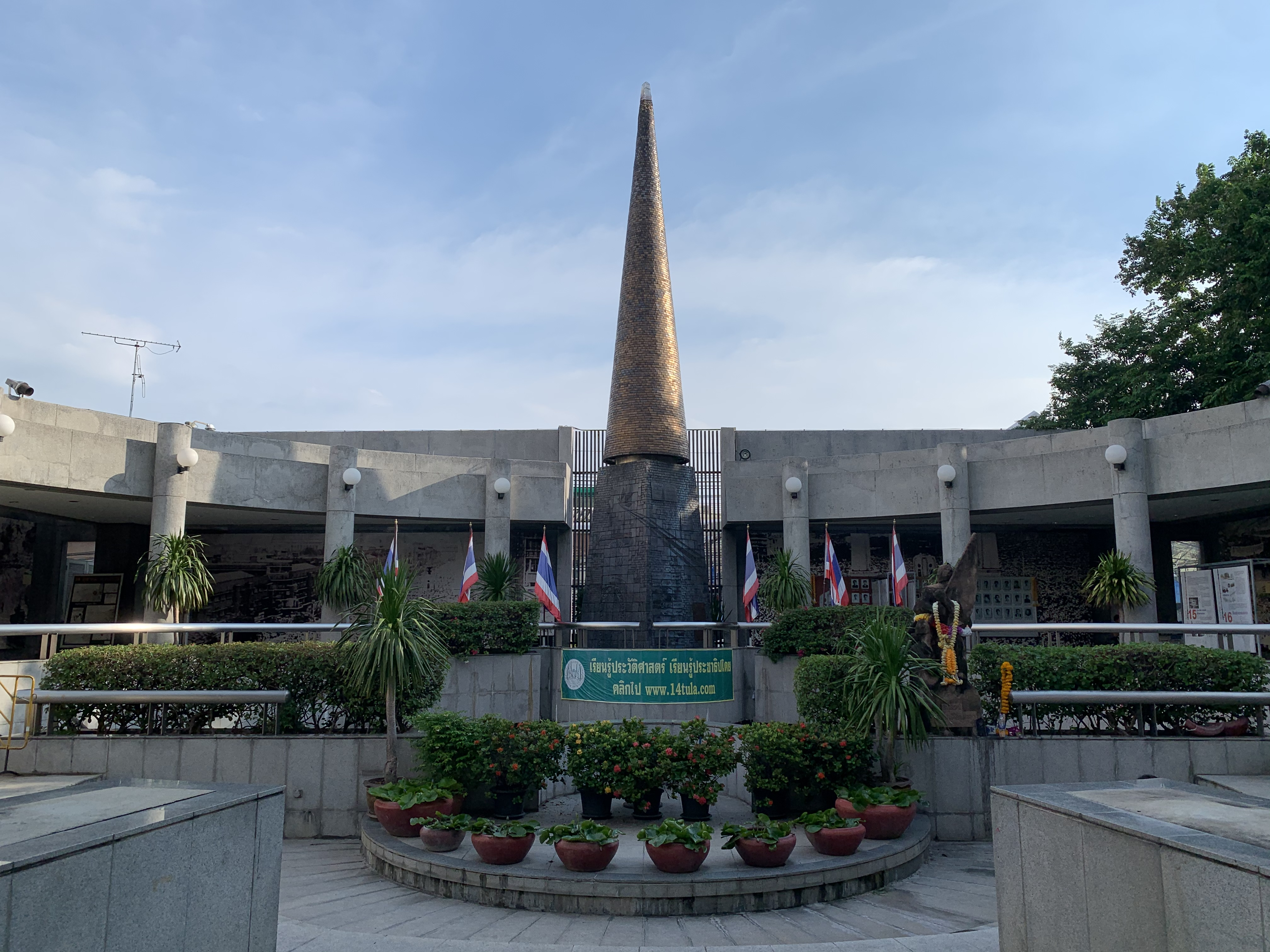
14 October 1973 Memorial

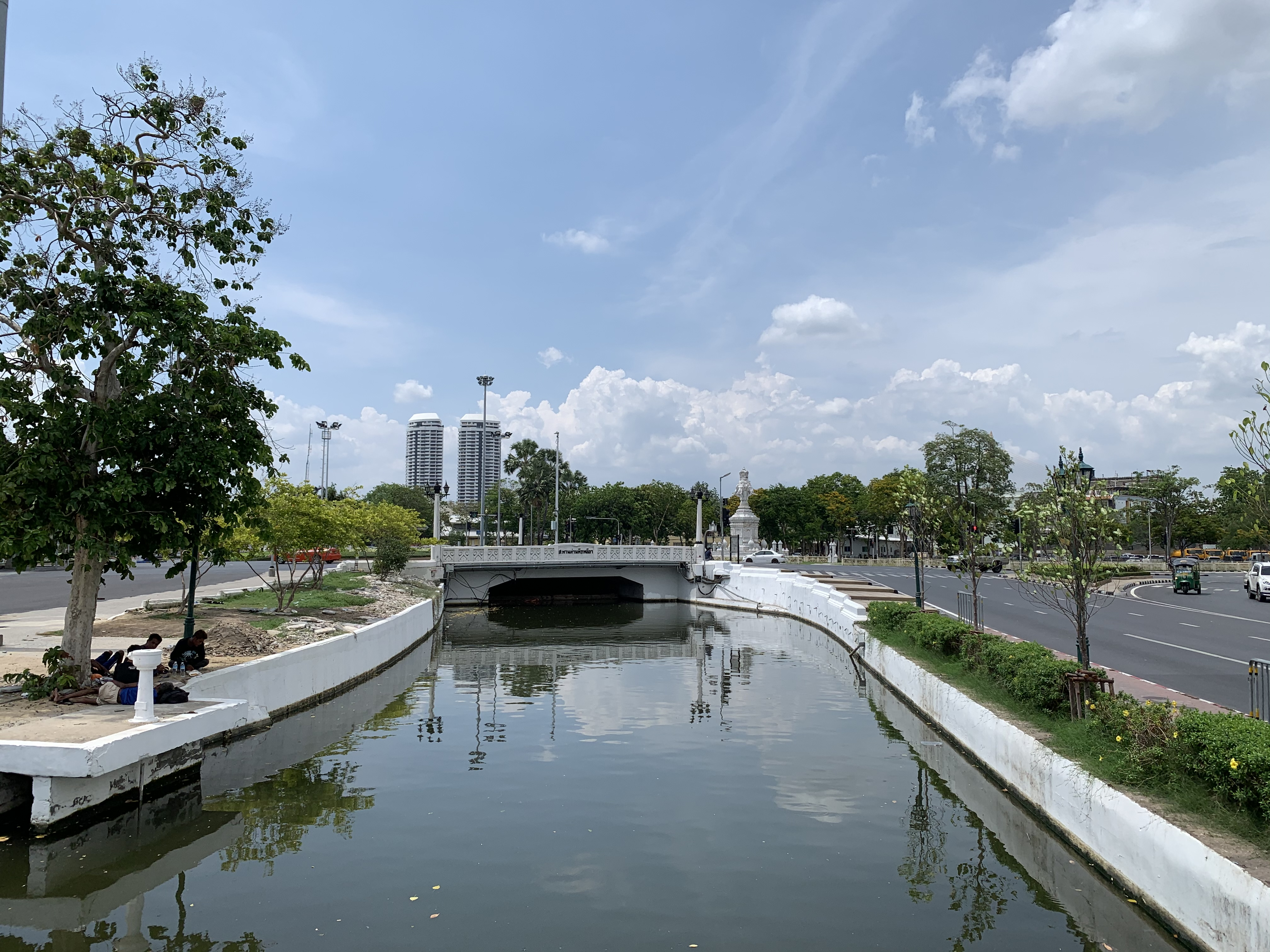
Phan Phiphop Lila Bridge

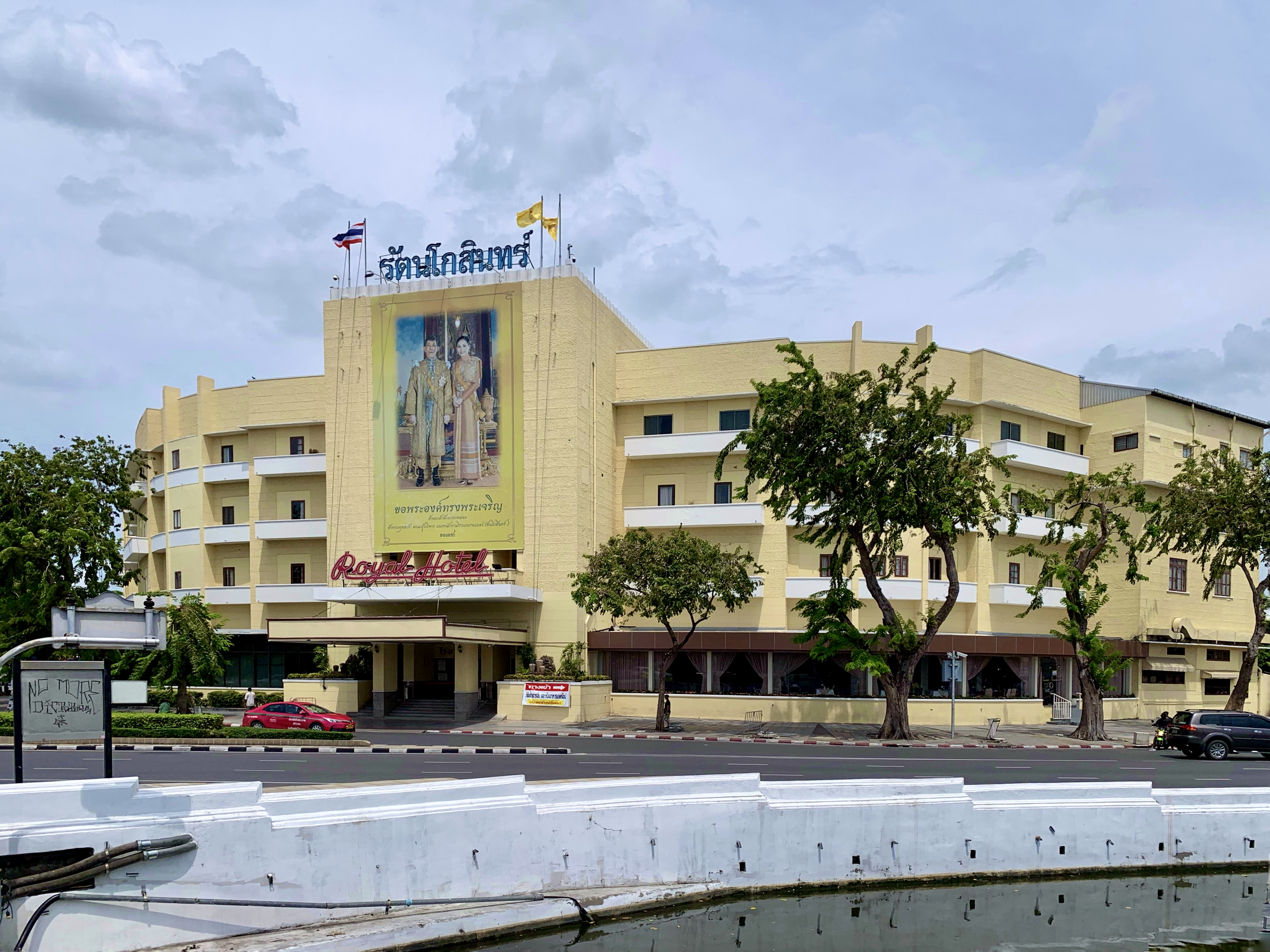
Royal Rattanakosin Hotel

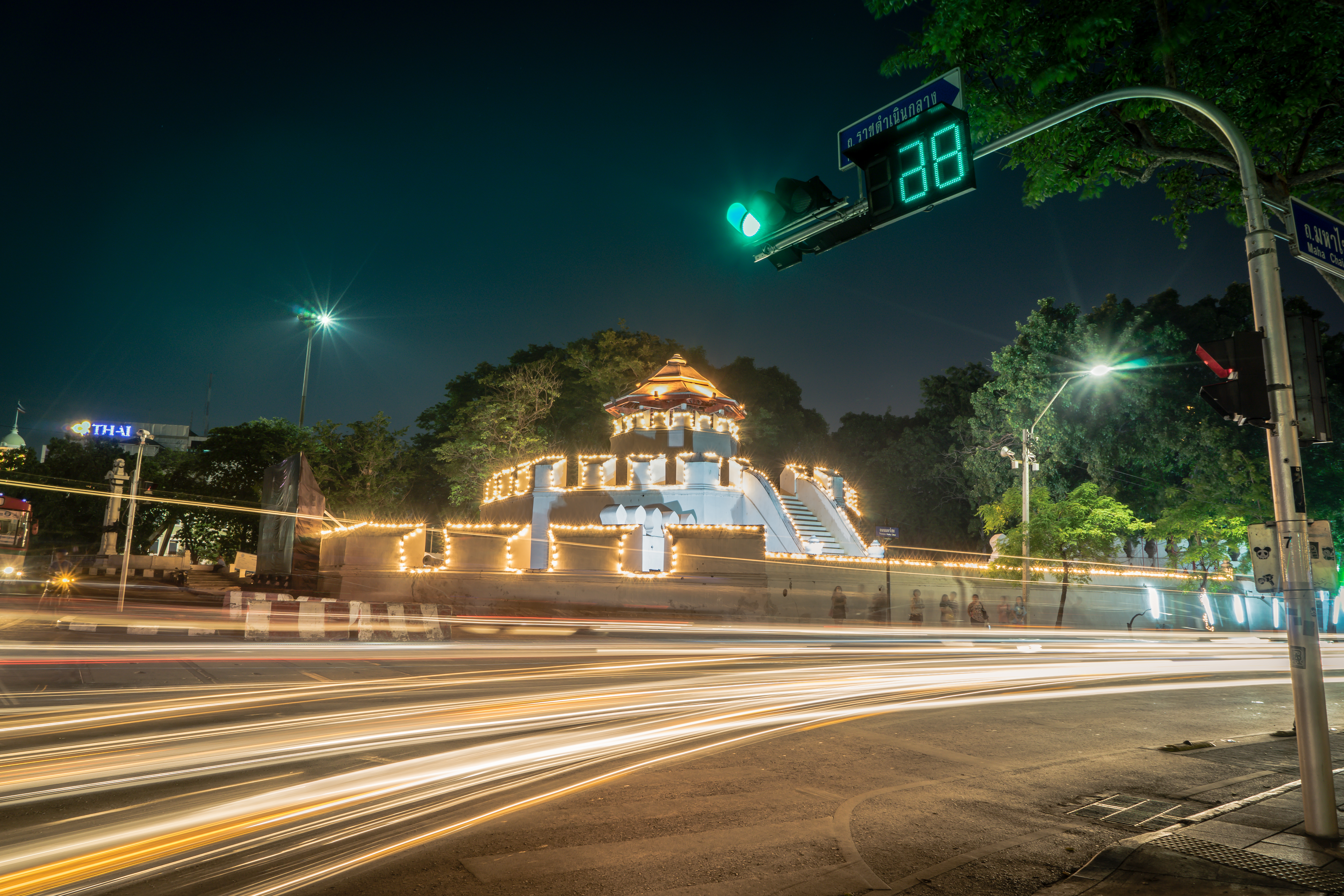
Mahakan Fort

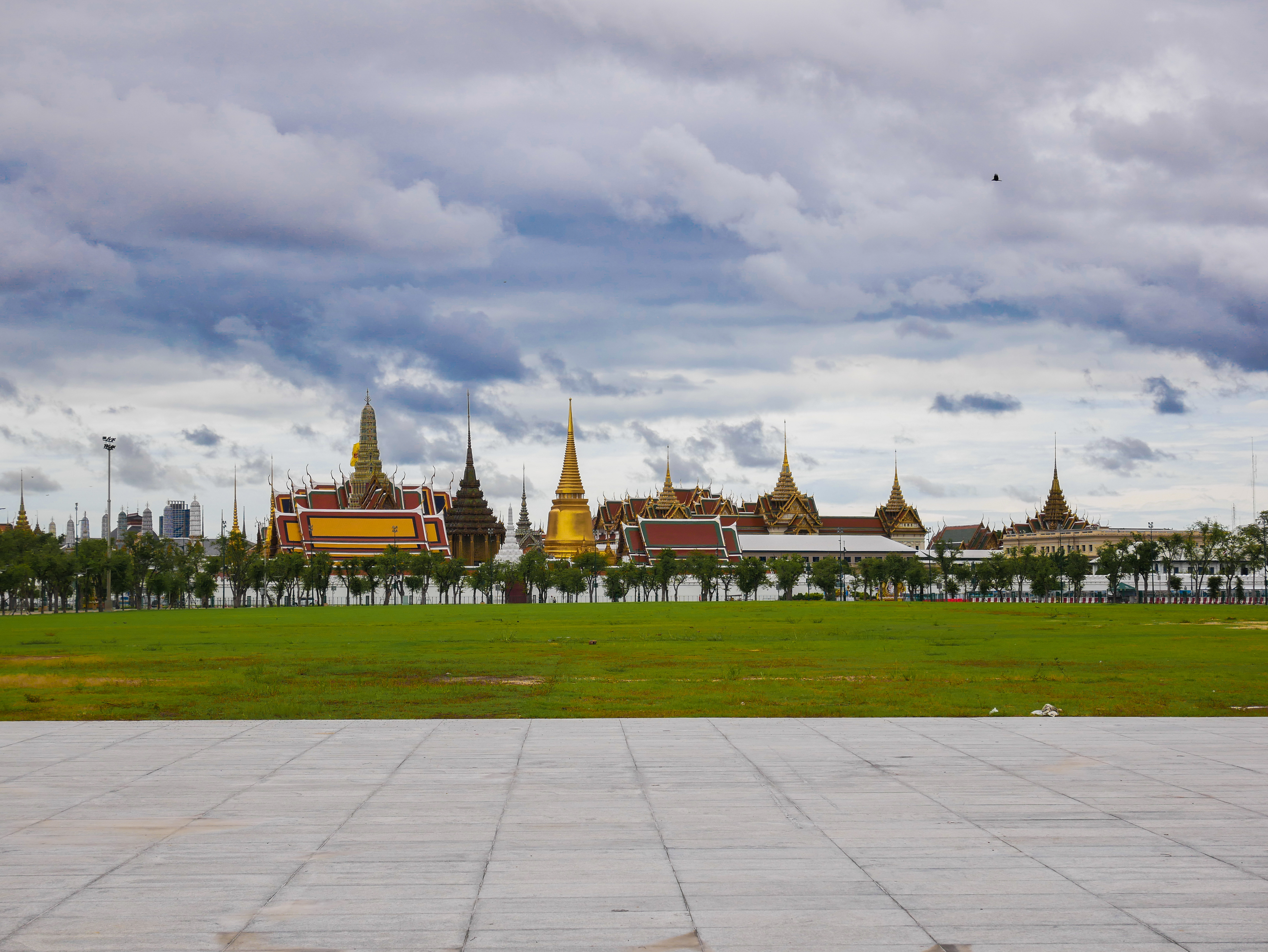
Sanam Luang

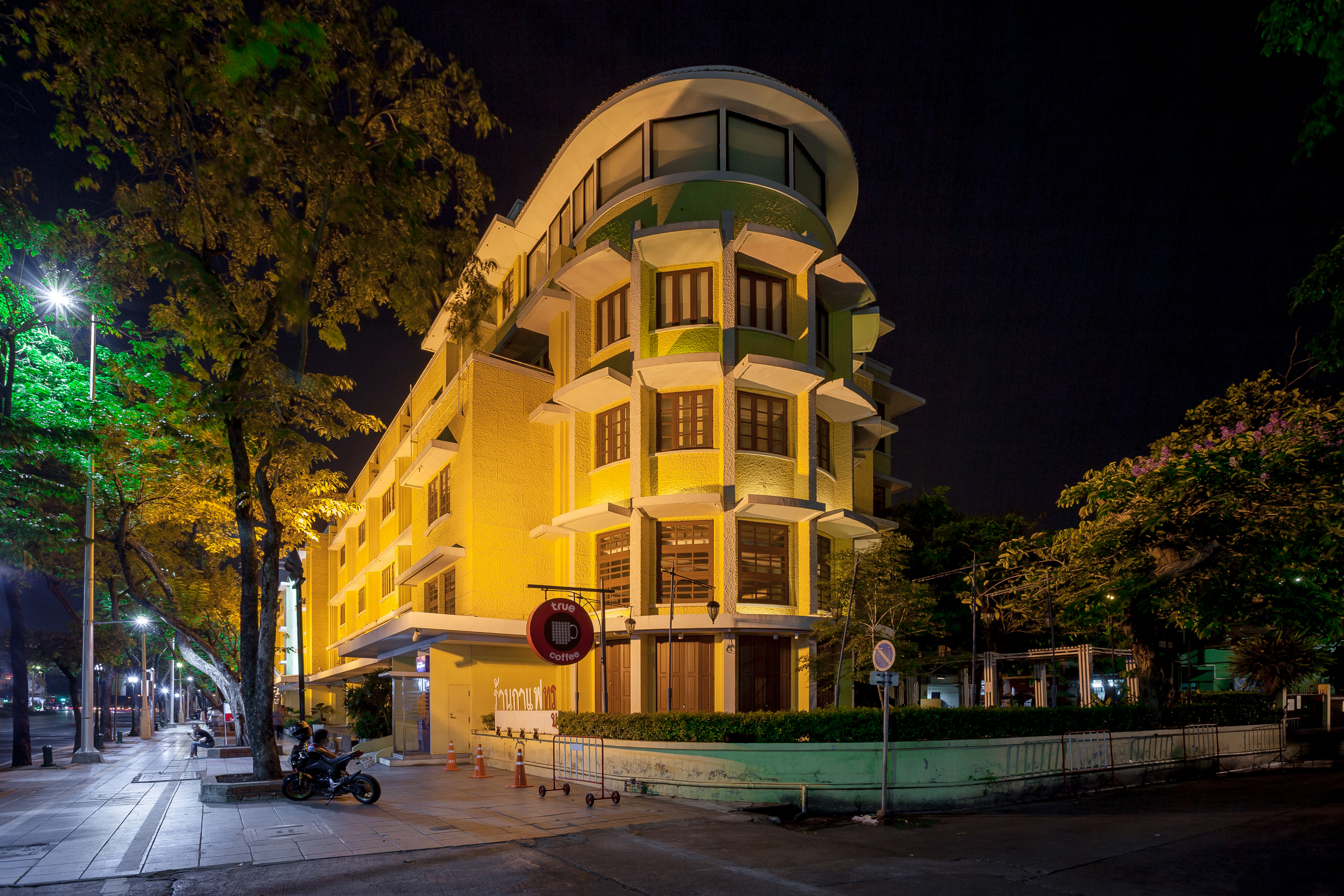
Rattanakosin Exhibition Hall

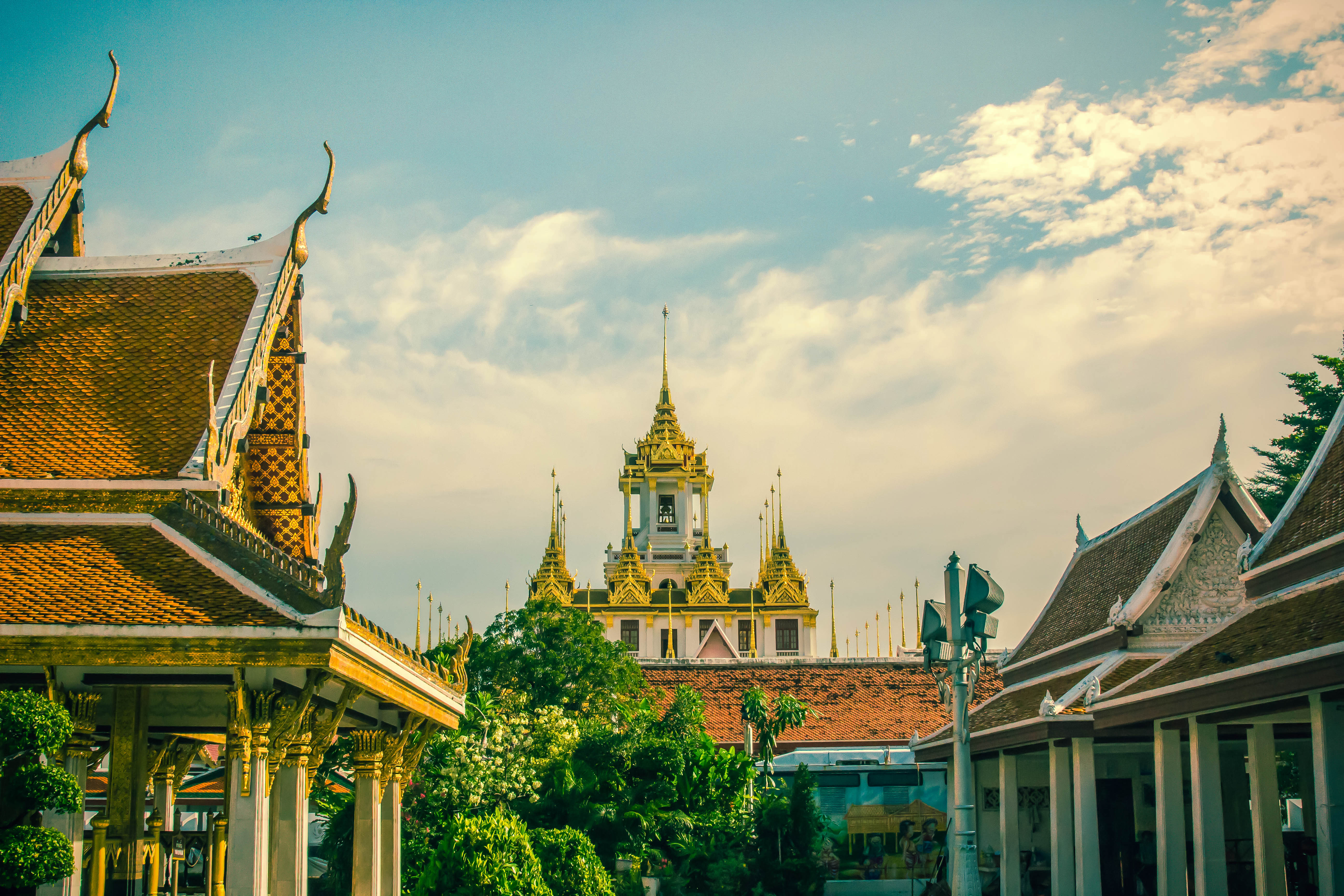
Wat Ratchanatdaram

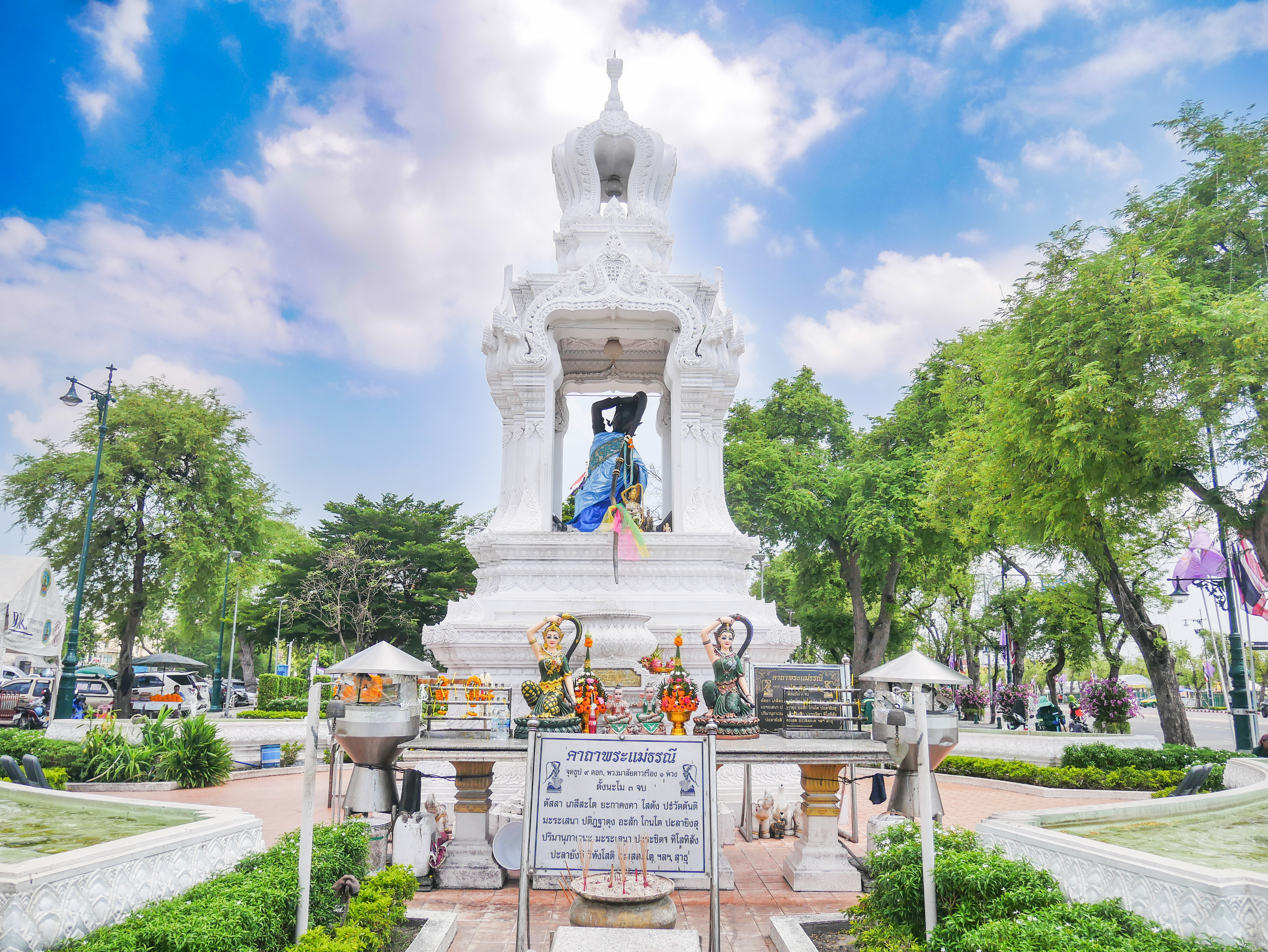
Statue of the Goddess of Earth squeezing water out of her hair bunt
