= 14 October 1973 Memorial =

Memorial in Thailand

Coordinates: 13°45′24″N 100°29′57″E

- อนุสรณ์สถาน 14 ตุลา
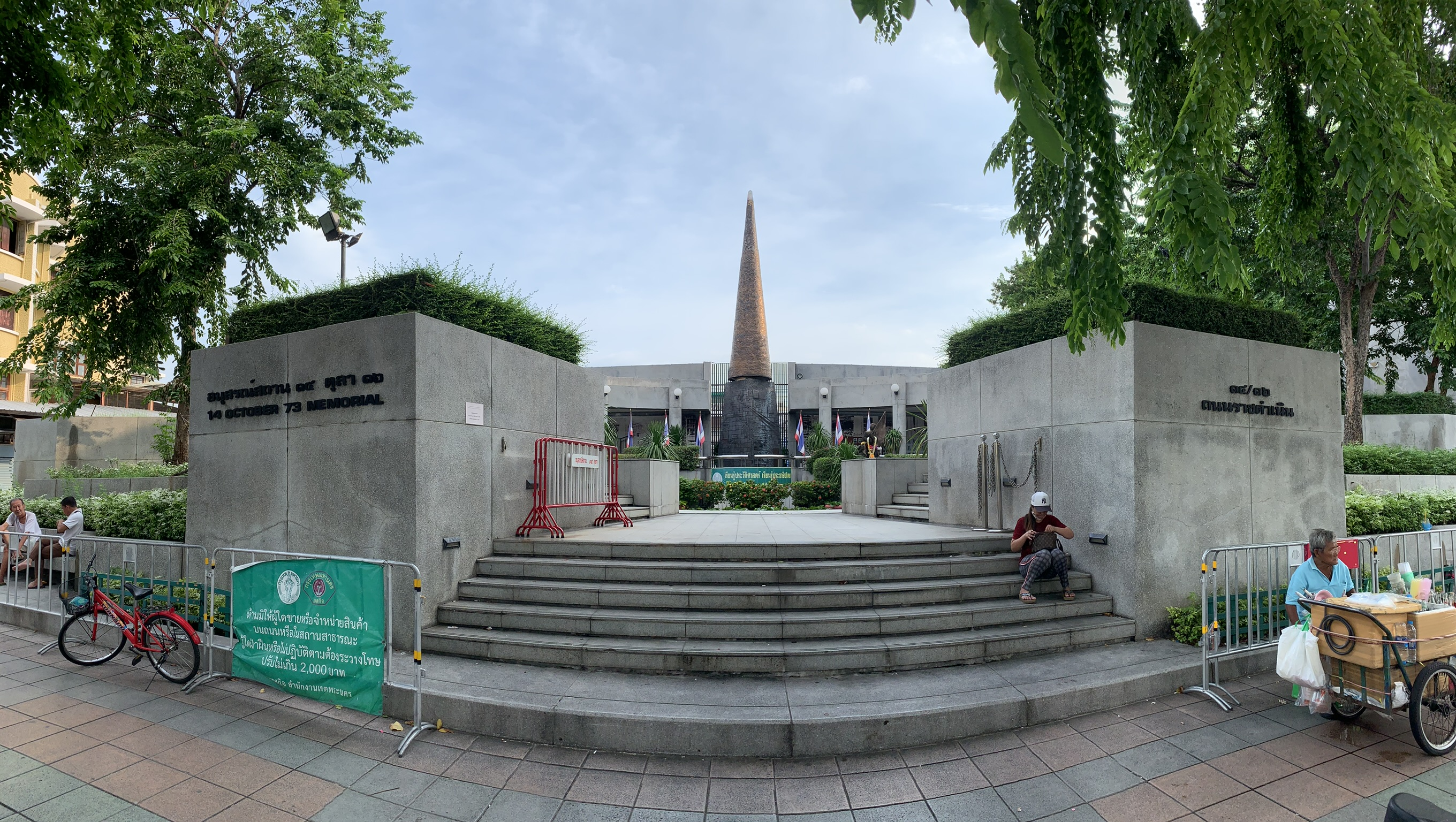
- Interactive map of 14 October 1973 Memorial
- Location: Ratchadamnoen Klang Avenue, Bangkok, Thailand
- Opening date: 1998
- Dedicated to: Victims of the 1973 Thai popular uprising

The 14 October 1973 Memorial (Thai: อนุสรณ์สถาน 14 ตุลา) is a memorial on Ratchadamnoen Avenue in Bangkok, Thailand, for the victims of the 1973 Thai popular uprising. Regarded as the first memorial in Thailand to commemorate those who fought for democracy, the monument was unveiled in 1998.

The memorial is a gathering place annually on 14 October to commemorate the anniversary of the uprising.
