= Samphanthawong subdistrict =

Coordinates: 13°44′13.9″N 100°30′46.7″E

Samphanthawong สัมพันธวงศ์
- Khwaeng
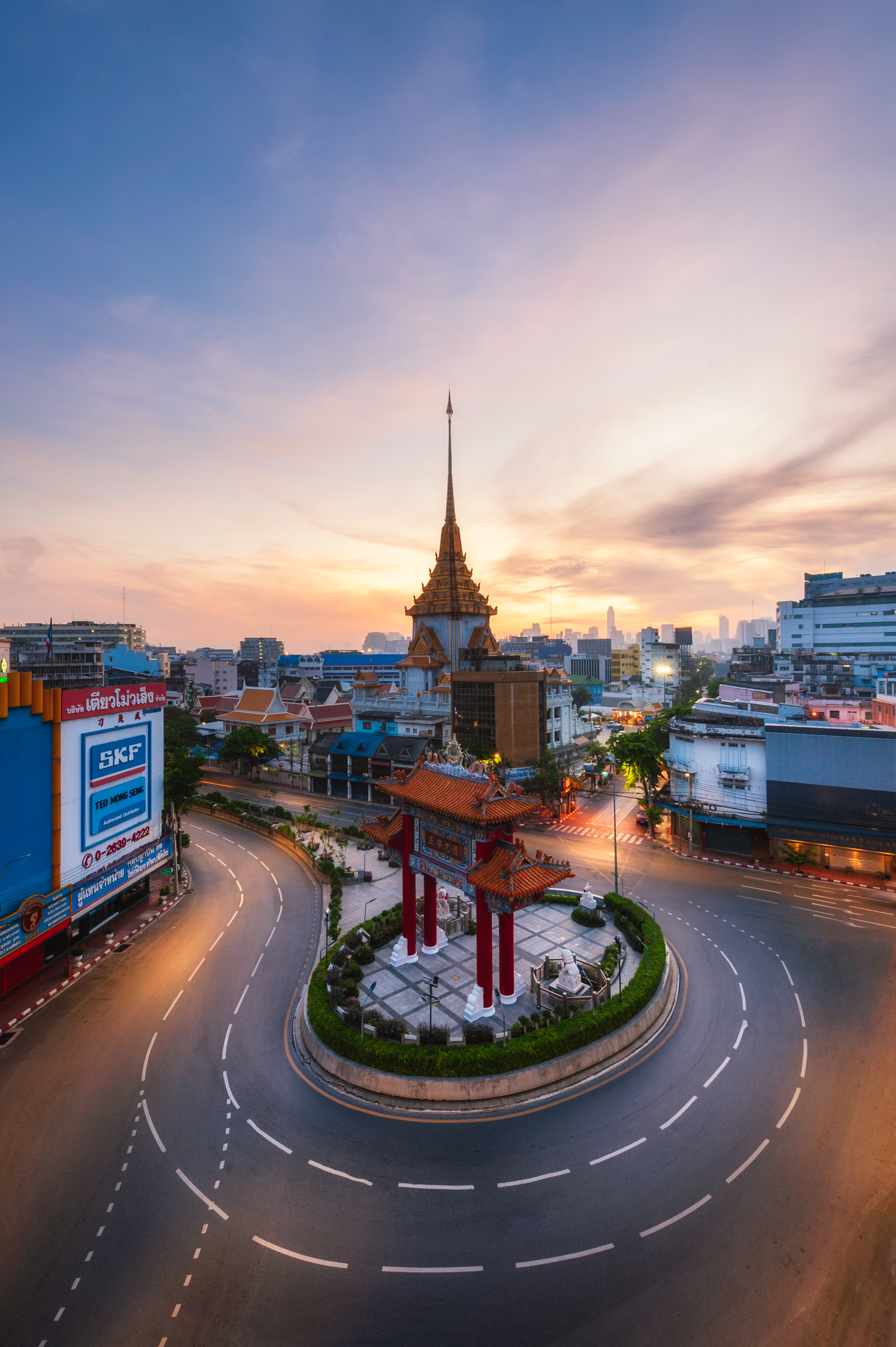
- Aerial view of Odeon Circle and Chinese Gate, while Wat Traimit in the back is located in Talat Noi.

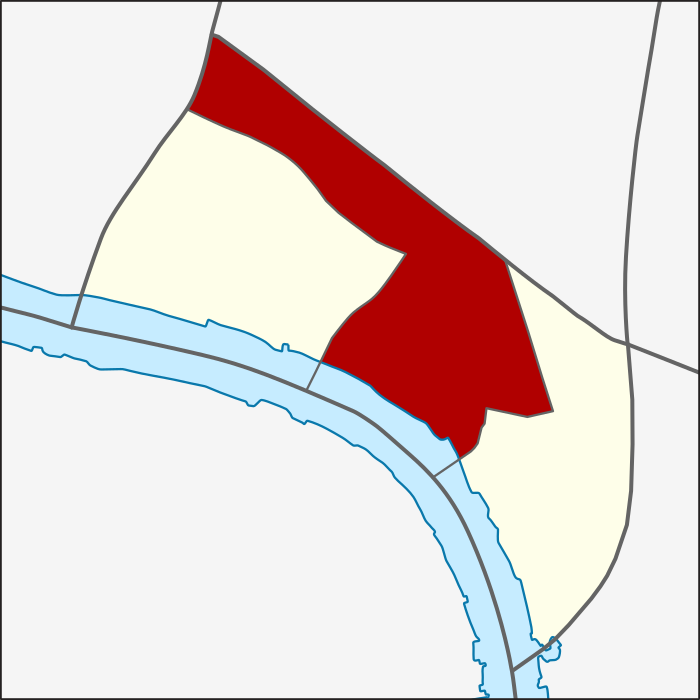
- Location in Samphanthawong district
- Country: Thailand
- Province: Bangkok
- Khet: Samphanthawong

Area
  - Total: 0.483 km^{2} (0.186 sq mi)

Population (2020)
  - Total: 7,998
- Time zone: UTC+7 (ICT)
- Postal code: 10100
- TIS 1099: 101302

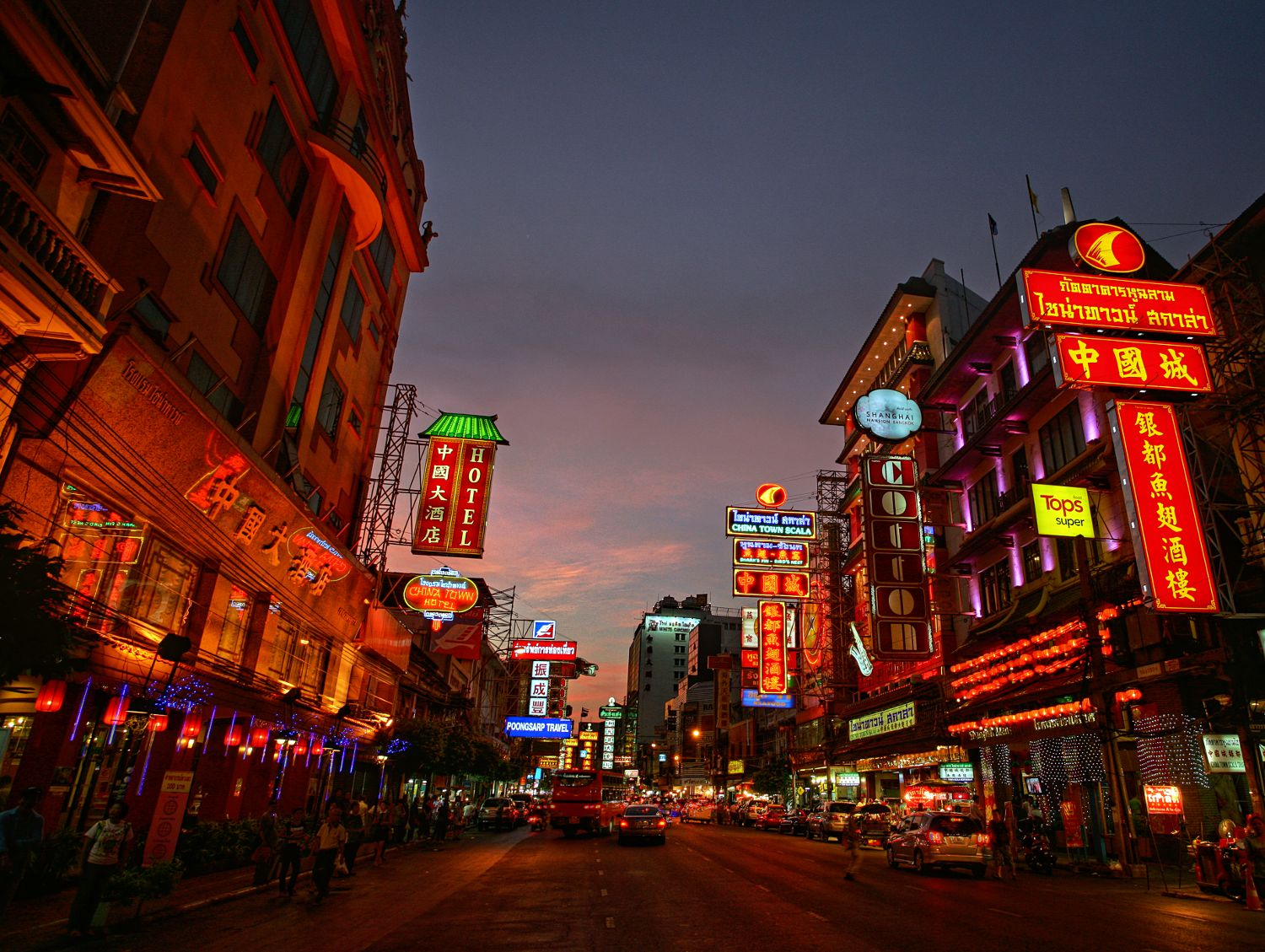
Yaowarat Road near Chaloem Buri Intersection.

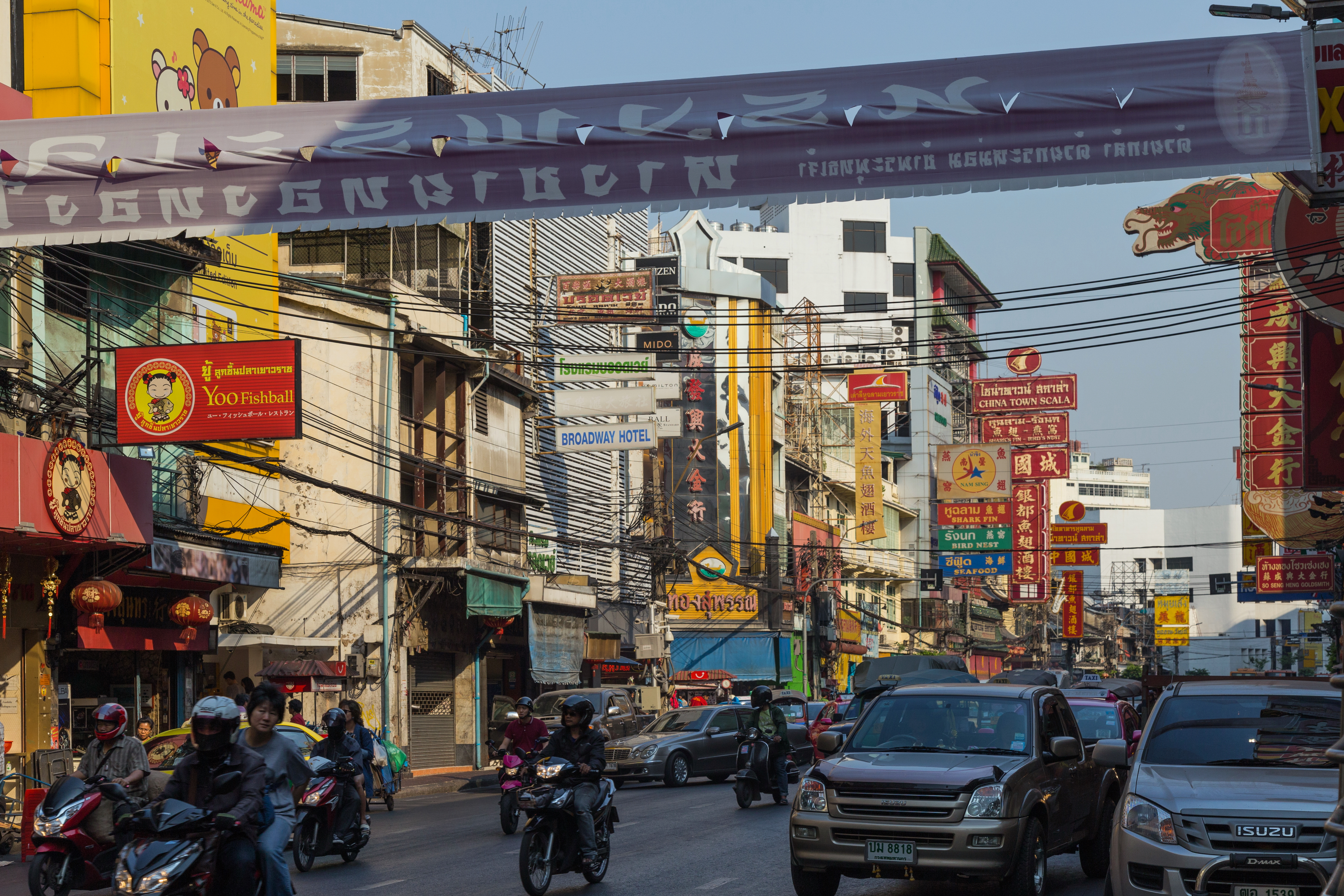
Daytime of Yaowarat Road.

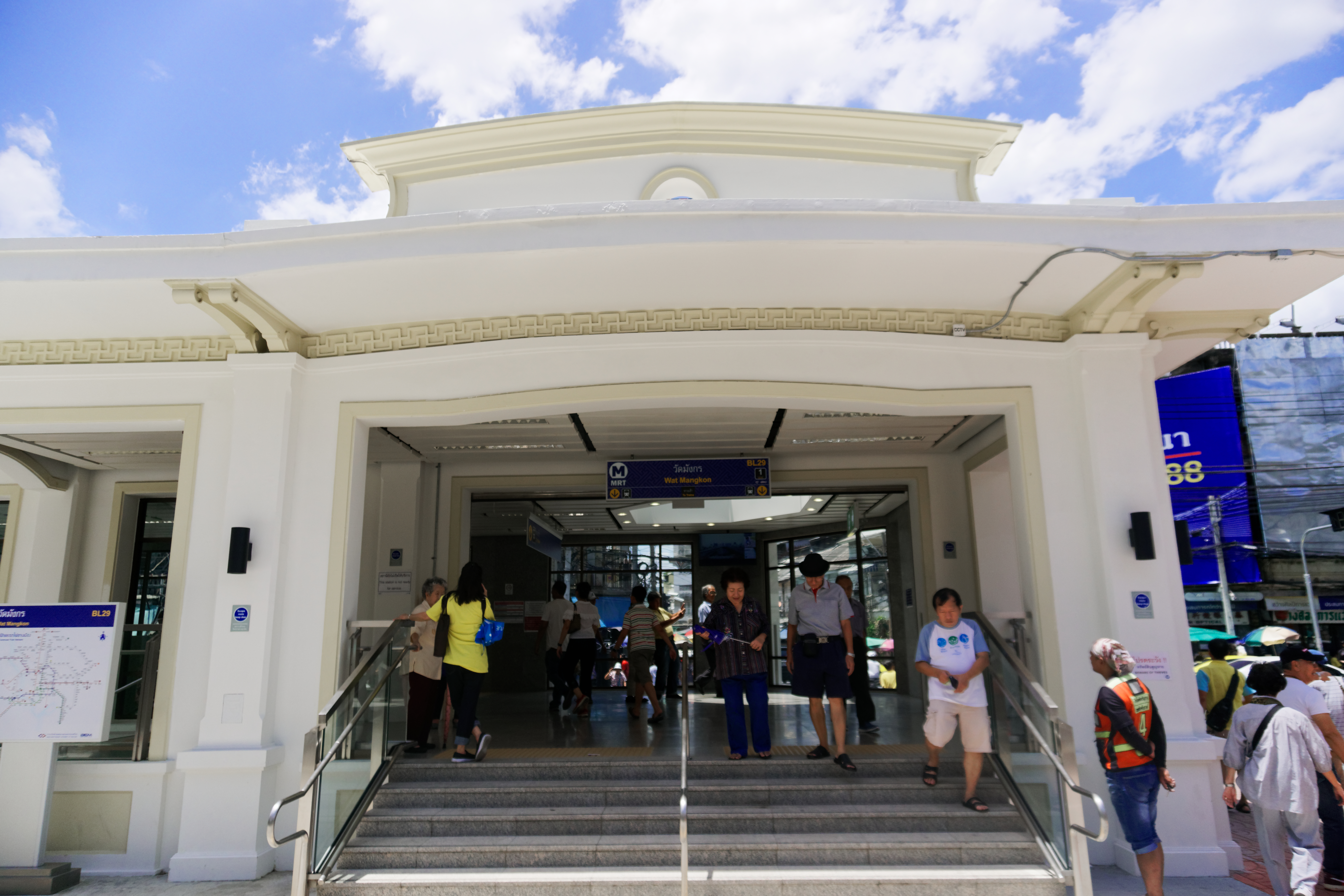
Entrance 1 of Wat Mangkon MRT Station adjacent to the entrance of Plaeng Nam Road.

Samphanthawong (Thai: สัมพันธวงศ์, pronounced [sǎm.pʰān.tʰā.wōŋ]) is one of the three khwaeng (subdistrict) of Samphanthawong district, Bangkok, regarded as the main area of the district.

== History ==
After the King Rama I established Rattanakosin (now Bangkok) as the new capital of Siam (now Thailand) on the right bank of Chao Phraya River in 1782. He allowed overseas Chinese who living around the Grand Palace to move to live in a new place far from the downtown at that time southeastward next to the Chao Phraya River known as "Sampheng", resulting in being a Chinatown and active commercial district from that time onwards.

Its name "Samphanthawong" after the local temple, Wat Samphanthawong. It dates from the Ayutthaya period and was known as Wat Ko (วัดเกาะ; lit: "island temple") due to its location surrounded by water. It was renovated by entirely by King Rama I and the name was changed to Wat Ko Kaew Langkaram (วัดเกาะแก้วลังการาม). In the reign of King Rama IV the name was again changed to what it is called today in honour to Prince Khrom Luang Phitak Montri, a nephew of King Rama I, who was the leader of the temple restoration.

The land near this temple was also the first lodging in Siam of Dan Beach Bradley, an American Protestant missionary, who also came to evangelize during the reigns of King Rama III and King Rama IV.

Yaowarat Road, which is regarded as the main artery of the district, was built in 1892 during the reign of King Rama V in order to expand traffic routes and habitats for the people of Bangkok continuing from Charoen Krung Road

In 1915, corresponding to the reign of King Rama VI. Samphanthawong was an amphoe (district) of Phra Nakhon province, same as neighbouring Sam Yaek, Sampheng, and Chakkrawat.

Later in 1931, during the reign of King Rama VII. When economic downturn, the Siamese government therefore has to save the nation's budget. Therefore, had to merge the Chakkrawat and Sampeng together with Samphanthawong since then.

Until the year 1973, Bangkok Metropolitan Administration (BMA) was officially established. Samphanthawong therefore changed the status to a full district and subdistrict until now. Samphanthawong is the smallest district of Bangkok, with a total area of only 1.4 km^{2} (0.5 sq mi).

== Geography ==
Neighbouring subdistricts are (from north clockwise): Ban Bat and Pom Prap of Pom Prap Sattru Phai District, Talat Noi in its district, Khlong San of Khlong San District (across Chao Phraya River), and Chakkrawat in its district. Samphanthawong regarded as the central part of the district.

== Demography ==
In 2017 it had a total population of 8,890 people (4,310 men, 4,580 women) in 4,415 households.

== Places ==
- Odeon Circle
- Wat Pathum Khongkha (Wat Sampheng)
- Wat Samphanthawong (Wat Ko)
- Thian Fah Foundation Hospital (Guanyin Shrine) and Samitivej Chinatown Hospital
- Chaloem Buri Intersection
- Yaowarat Road
- Plaeng Nam Road
- Phadung Dao Road (Trok Texas)
- Woeng Nakhon Khasem (Thieves' Market)
- Wat Mangkon MRT station (BL29)
- Wat Bamphen Chin Phrot (Yong Hok Yi)
- Leng Buai Ia Shrine
- Khlong Thom
- Soi Wanit 1 (Sampheng)
