= Mo Mi =

Road intersection in Bangkok, Thailand

Coordinates: 13°44′25.55″N 100°30′44.03″E

- หมอมี
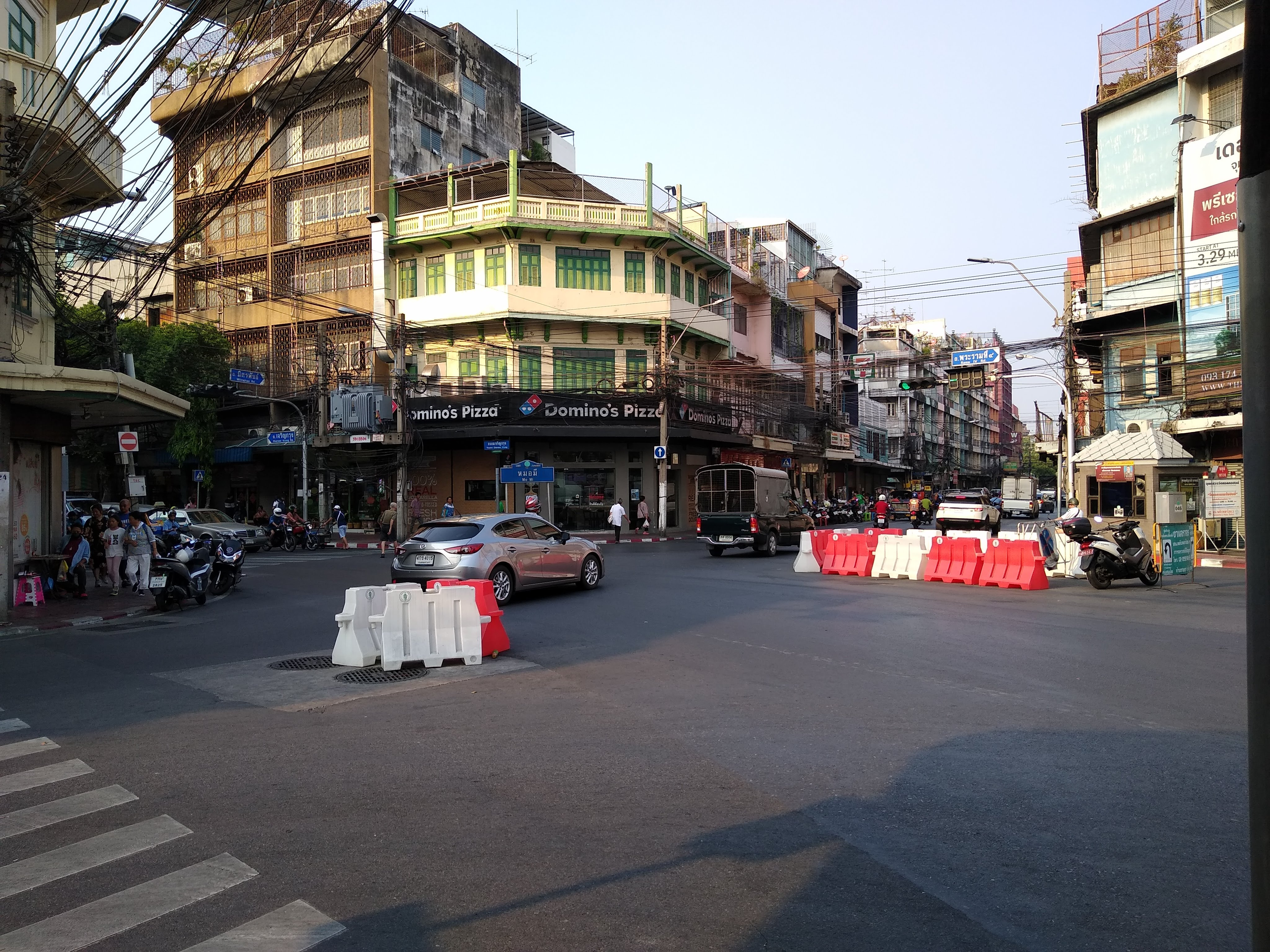
- Seen from Song Sawat road

Location
- Pom Prap Sattru Phai and Samphanthawong districts, Bangkok
- Roads at junction: Mittraphan (northeast); Rama IV (southeast); Charoen Krung (south–northwest); Song Sawat (southwest)

Construction
- Type: Five-way at-grade intersection

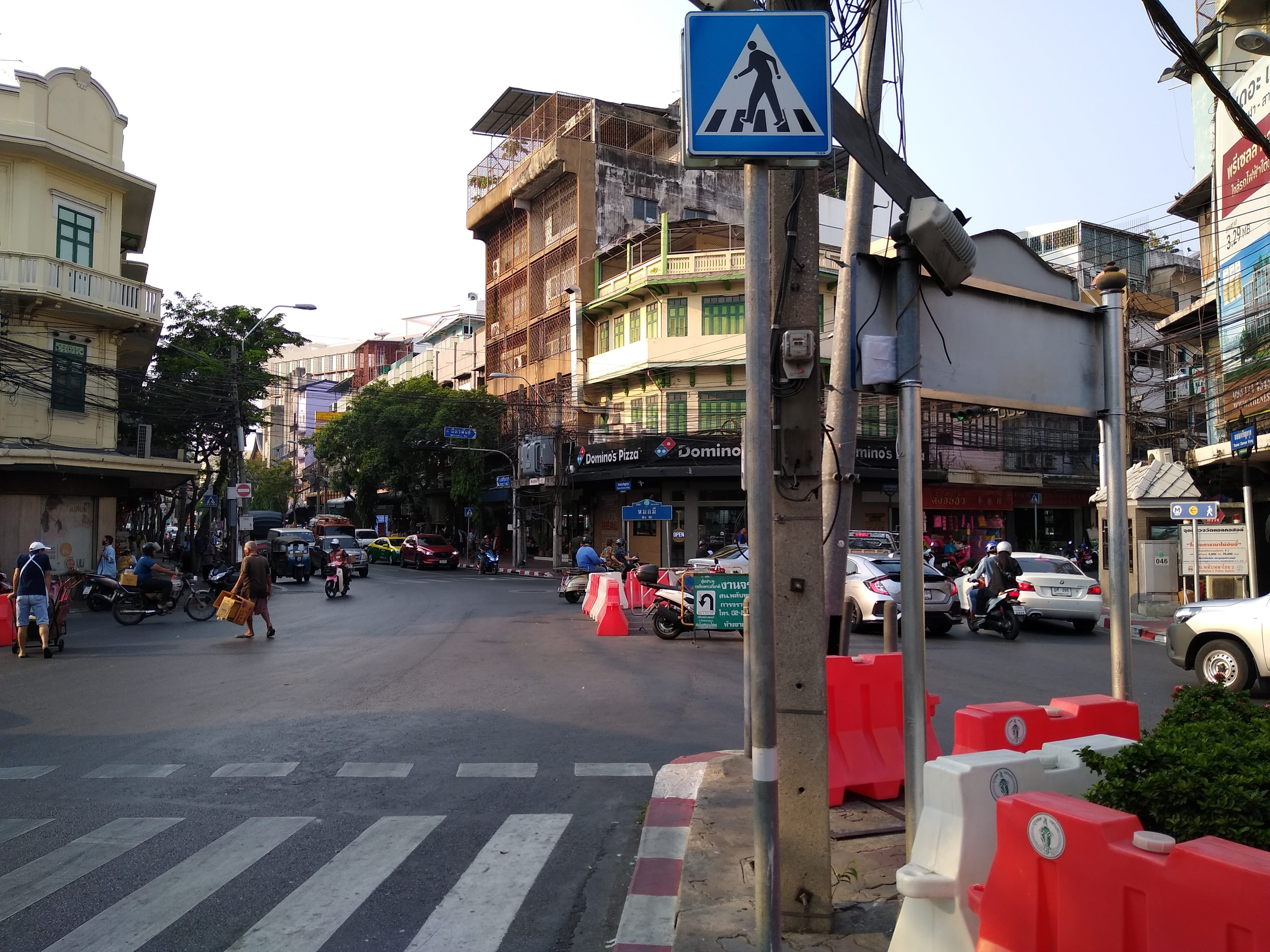
View of Mo Mi from Charoen Krung road toward Canton Shrine and Wat Mangkon Kamalawat

Mo Mi (Thai: หมอมี, pronounced [mɔ̌ː mīː]) is a large intersection located in the centre of Bangkok's Chinatown quarter lies on the tripoint between Pom Prap of Pom Prap Sattru Phai district and Talat Noi with Samphanthawong of Samphanthawong district.

This intersection consists of the following roads: Charoen Krung (toward Odeon Circle and Wat Traimit), Rama IV (toward Hua Lamphong), Song Sawat (from Wat Samphanthawong and Sampheng, via Song Wat road) and Mittraphan (toward July 22nd Circle).

The boundaries of Mo Mi are considered to be where Rama IV and Mittraphan roads originate, and where Song Sawat road terminates.

Mo Mi, formerly and still colloquially known as Sam Yaek (สามแยก, pronounced [sǎːm jɛ̂ːk], lit. 'Three-Way Junction'), and Sam Yaek Charoen Krung (สามแยกเจริญกรุง, pronounced [sǎːm jɛ̂ːk t͡ɕā.rɤ̄ːn krūŋ], lit. 'Three-Way Junction of Charoen Krung'). The original name of Mo Mi came from the fact that during King Mongkut (Rama IV)'s reign, Mo Mi was only a three-way junction consisting of Charoen Krung and Thanon Trong roads which later became Rama IV road.

Charoen Krung Road that runs through this area from Damrong Sathit bridge (Saphan Lek) to here also serves as an administrative boundary between Pom Prap Sattru Phai (left side) with Samphanthwawong (right side) districts, and also has one-way traffic as well.

Under the past administration of Amphoe Samphanthawong, this area or tambon (lit. 'sub-district') was called "Tambon Sam Yaek" in the province of Phra Nakhon (known today as Bangkok).

In 1898, a fire occurred in this area, spreading rapidly across the neighbourhood because of its contemporary design of wooden framing with thatched roofs combined with the high density of houses. Since then, the government in general banned the construction of wooden dwellings. The surviving Phlapphla Chai 2 Police Station site on Phlapphla Chai road was known as Sam Yaek Police Station at the time of the fire.

"Mo Mi" was named after Boonmi Kasemsuvan, also affectionately known as Mo Mi, a pharmacist who specialized in herbal and medical chemistry, especially snuff. His dispensary was located in the area.

The area around Mo Mi in the past was well-known as a centre of chick and duckling stores, but at present there is only one left on Rama IV Road. It was also home to many leading movie theatres, now closed. In 1921, during the reign of King Rama VI, a period that promoted both professional boxing and Muay Thai, several boxing arenas were established across Bangkok. One of these was located in the Mo Mi area and was named Phatthanakan Stadium, after the district's most renowned movie theatre.

One interesting thing about this intersection is the location of Tai Sia Huk Chou Shrine, a small old joss house on Rama IV road, the only one shrine dedicated to Sun Wukong in the Chinatown area.

At present the land plot around Mo Mi belongs to the Crown Property Bureau (CPB), and is well known as the centre of foods and desserts with famous ancient restaurants, like Singapore, which has been the first to sell cendol iced sweet dessert in Thailand for over 100 years. At the end of 2023, CPB renovated the shophouses to be more modern. These restaurants had to move to new locations in nearby areas.

The vacant land from the demolition was developed into Chinatown Market Chaloem Buri (named after Chaloem Buri, a parallel crossroads on the opposite side of Yaowarat road), a new night market, along with the installation of a Chinese archway called "Vajirathamrong 72 Phansa" to celebrate the 72nd birthday of King Vajiralongkorn (Rama X), alongside a similar archway at the foot of Damrong Sathit bridge.

The night market operated for a short period but closed in May 2025 to make way for the construction of the Grande Centre Point Chinatown Hotel, part of the same hotel chain as the Grande Centre Point Surawong in the Bang Rak area.
