= Wat Samphanthawongsaram =

- Wat Ko
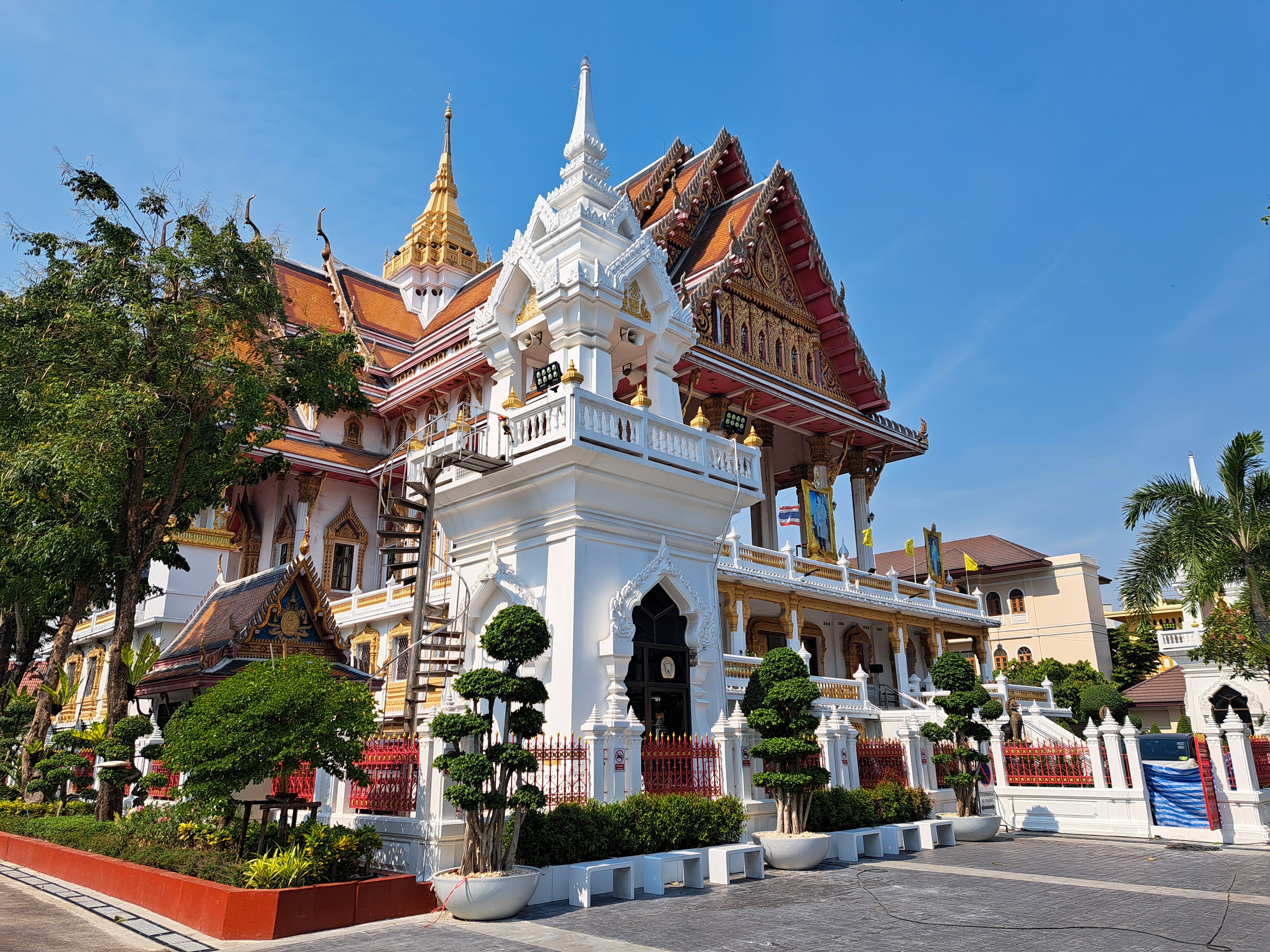

- Location within Bangkok

Religion
- Affiliation: Buddhism
- Sect: Thammayut

Location
- Location: 579 Song Sawat Rd, Samphanthawong, Samphanthawong, Bangkok
- Country: Thailand
- Interactive map of Wat Samphanthawongsaram
- Coordinates: 13.738559°N 100.509962°E

Wat Samphanthawongsaram Worawiharn (Thai: วัดสัมพันธวงศาราม วรวิหาร), also known in short Wat Samphanthawongsaram is a third grade royal Buddhist temple of Worawihan in Dhammayuttika Nikaya sect. It is situated in the area of Sampheng, also known as Bangkok's Chinatown.

The monastery is an ancient temple, which was built in Ayutthaya period. It was formerly surrounded by natural khlong (canal) bridging to Chao Phraya River which brought its local name Wat Ko (the island temple). In the beginning of Rattanakosin in 1796, King Rama I renovated the entire temple and made it a royal temple with the name Wat Ko Kaew Langkaram. Later on, in the reign of King Rama IV, the name was changed to Wat Samphanthawongsaram Worawiharn in present, to honour Prince Samphanthawong (Chui), King Rama I's nephew who was the head of major temple restoration (its name also became the name of the district later).

The principal Buddha image inside the ordination hall is a seated Buddha in Maravijaya attitude, made of hollow log with lime covering. The image's arms are made of wood with gold application. Inside the image and under its base contain numbers of silver and lead votive tablets.

The area of the temple was once the first lodging in Dan Beach Bradley's country of Siam (Thailand in those days), an American physician and Protestant missionary who came to Siam to evangelise. He was also the founder of the first printing house in Siam. For this reason, there were many printing houses around the temple in those days.

In the reign of King Rama V, he presided over the Thot Kathin ceremony at this temple along with nearby temple Wat Pathum Khongkha.

Moreover, in the 1932 Siamese revolution. The naval faction of Khana Ratsadon (People's Party), they had mobilised about 500 armed sailors occupying the Royal Plaza in the dawn of June 24, 1932, claiming to suppress the Chinese uprising at this temple.
