= Leng Buai Ia Shrine =

Chinese shrine in Thailand

Coordinates: 13°44′31″N 100°30′33″E

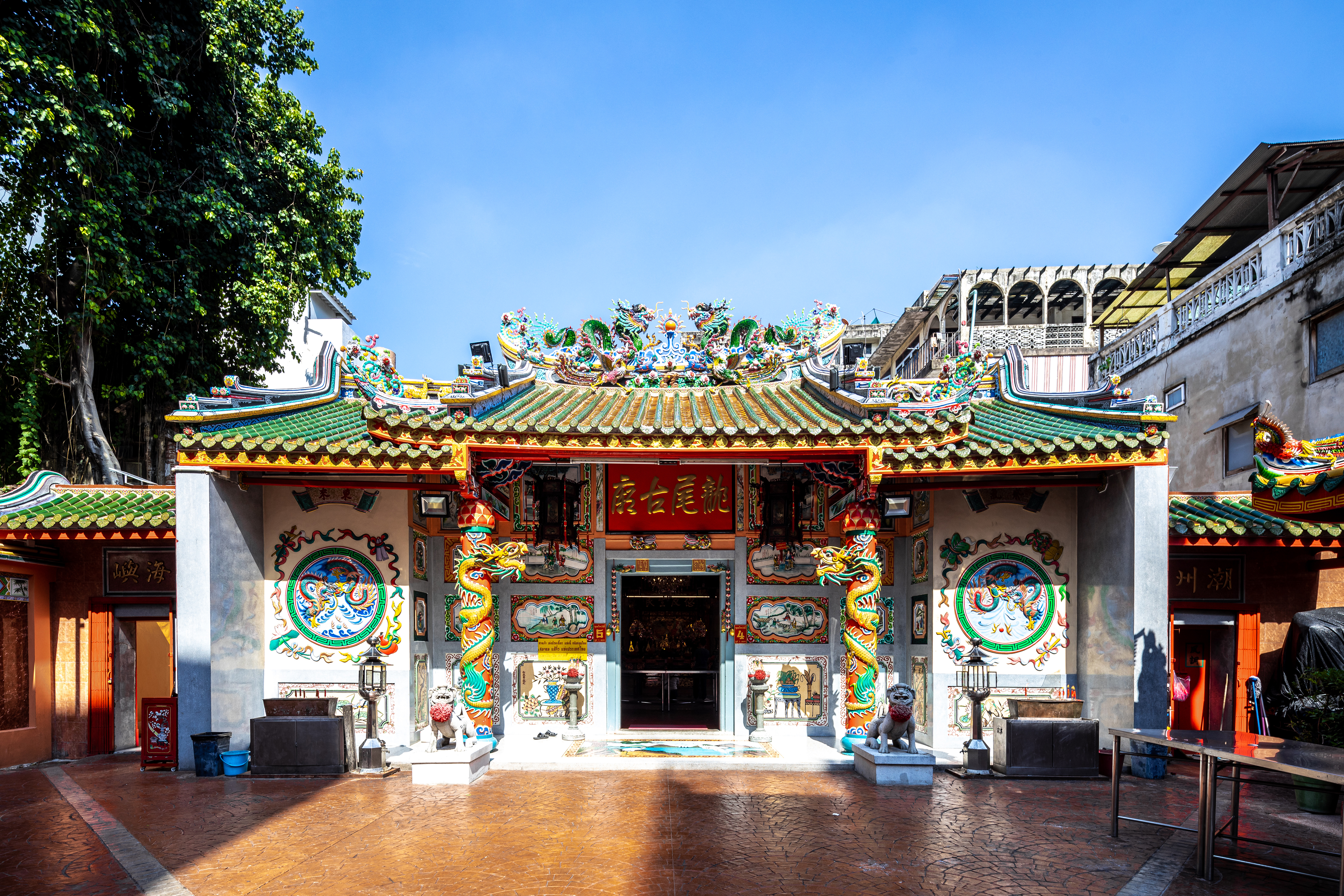
Leng Buai Ia Shrine in 2023

Leng Buai Ia Shrine (Thai: ศาลเจ้าเล่งบ๊วยเอี๊ยะ; Chinese: 龍尾古廟; pinyin: Lóngwěi Gǔmiào) is a Chinese shrine, in the Samphanthawong district of Bangkok's Chinatown. It is located within Talat Kao market on Yaowarat Soi 6, off Yaowarat Road.

== History ==
The shrine is considered to be the oldest Chinese shrine in Thailand, based on a plaque contained inside with a Chinese inscription stating that it was built in 1658, during the Ayutthaya period. However, this claim lacks concrete evidence. The founding year recorded on the shrine's bell indicates the 23rd year of Daoguang Emperor of the Qing dynasty, corresponding to 1843, which falls during the reign of King Nangklao (Rama III) in the Rattanakosin era.

Thought to have originally been a Teochew-style shrine, it would have been used by Chinese businessmen aiming to improve the prosperity of their businesses and to establish social connections.

== Style and layout ==
Built in a classic Chinese architectural style, the shrine has a roof made of glazed colored tiles, adorned with two ceramic-clad dragons. The two main columns at the shrine entrance are also entwined by ceramic-clad dragons.

The shrine contains, at its center, an altar dedicated to Leng Buai Ia and his wife. To the left and right there are altars dedicated to the Martial Deity, Lord Guan (Guan Yu) and the Queen of Heaven, Tianhou respectively.

Near the entrance is an ancient bell attributed to the Daoguang Emperor, towards the end of the Qing dynasty.

Other items inside the shrine include three plaques from the reign of the Kangxi Emperor in the Qing dynasty, a bell inscribed with the name of Choen Thai Chue, and a container for incense sticks given as a gift from King Chulalongkorn (Rama V).
