= Phadung Dao Road =

Road in Bangkok, Thailand

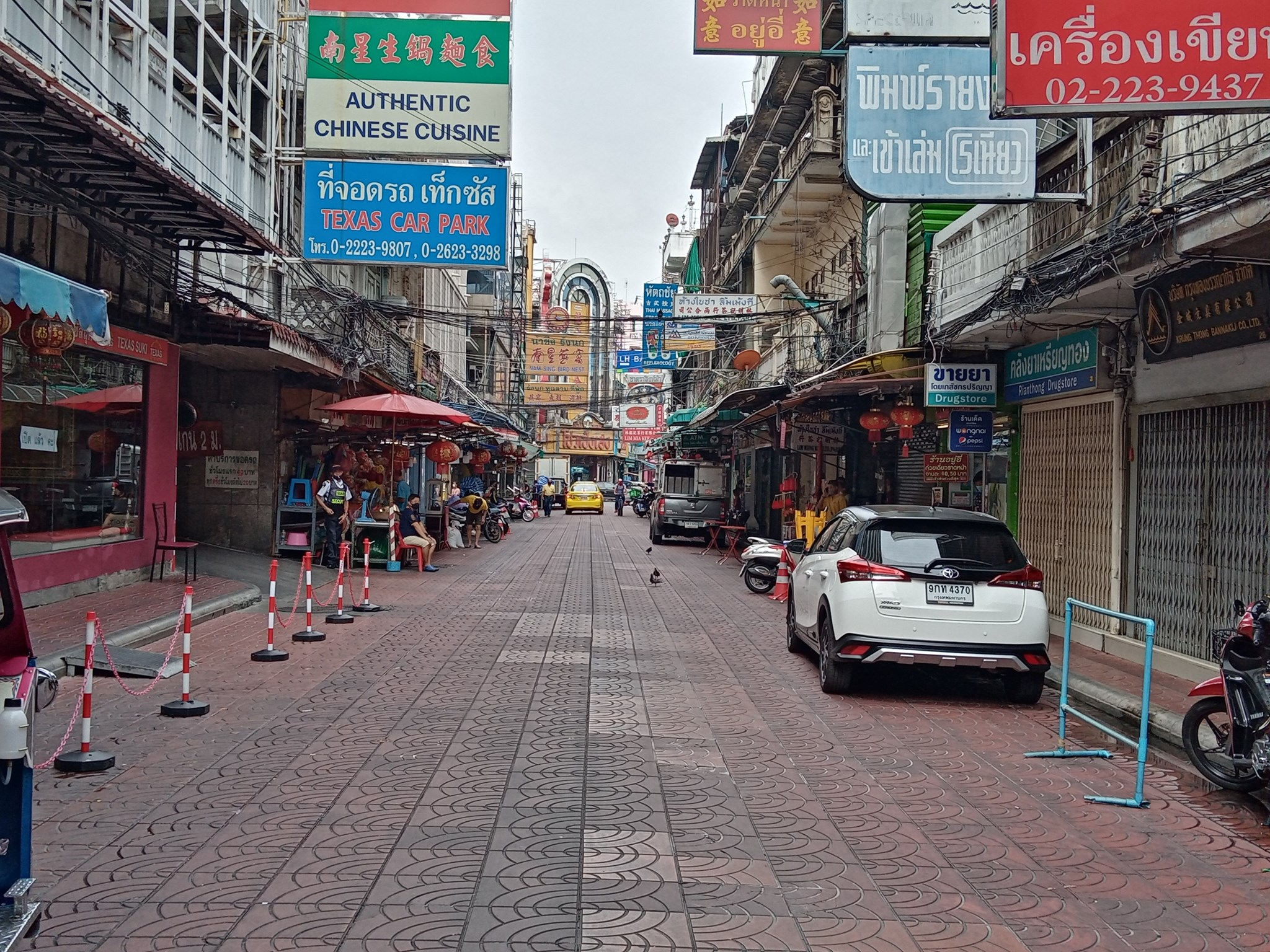
- Phadung Dao Road (view toward Yaowarat side)
- Interactive map of Phadung Dao Road
- Native name: ถนนผดุงด้าว
- Length: 200 m (660 ft)
- Location: Samphanthawong, Bangkok, Thailand
- Coordinates: 13°44′26″N 100°30′39″E
- Southwest end: Phat Sai Road
- Northeast end: Charoen Krung Road

Phadung Dao Road (Thai: ถนนผดุงด้าว, RTGS: Thanon Phadung Dao, pronounced [tʰā.nǒn pʰā.dūŋ dâːw]) is a road located in Bangkok's Chinatown area and can be considered a soi (alleyway). The road consists of two short sections: the first runs from the east side of Charoen Krung Road (New Road) toward Yaowarat Road; the second extends from Yaowarat Road up to Phat Sai Road. Its total length is approximately 200 m (0.12 mi).

In the year 1932 during the reign of King Prajadhipok (Rama VII), the Ministry of Interior requested the names of some roads in Bangkok from the king, for celebrate the 150th anniversary of Rattanakosin (Bangkok). He offered that names of the new roads should be neutral names, like Bamrung Mueang or Fueang Nakhon. The Krom Phra Alak (Royal Scribe Department) at that time thought of the name of roads that ran from Charoen Krung to Phat Sai Roads and it was divided into two parts. The Ministry of Interior suggested that they should actually be one road, so the Krom Phra Alak had thought of the names for the roads that started from Charoen Krung Road followed by Phadung Phao Road or Phadung Dao Road, Yaowarat Road, Phat Sai Road. Finally, the king had selected the name of the road to be "Phadung Dao Road" (lit. 'the road upholding the land'), and he also announced that it is appropriately to be the one road.

However, it is still colloquially known as Trok Texas and Soi Texas (Texas Lane), since in the past it was the location of a movie theater named Texas. The theater specialized in showing Bollywood films that were popular at the time. Today, the former Texas Theater building houses a restaurant named Texas Suki. Notably, in July 1974, nearby at the Phlapphla Chai area, a crowd gathered in front of the Phlapphla Chai police station. This gathering eventually escalated into a violent riot, with many of those involved being people who had just left the Texas Theater after watching a movie.

During that period, it was a red-light district and was the first place in Thailand where porn magazines were sold.

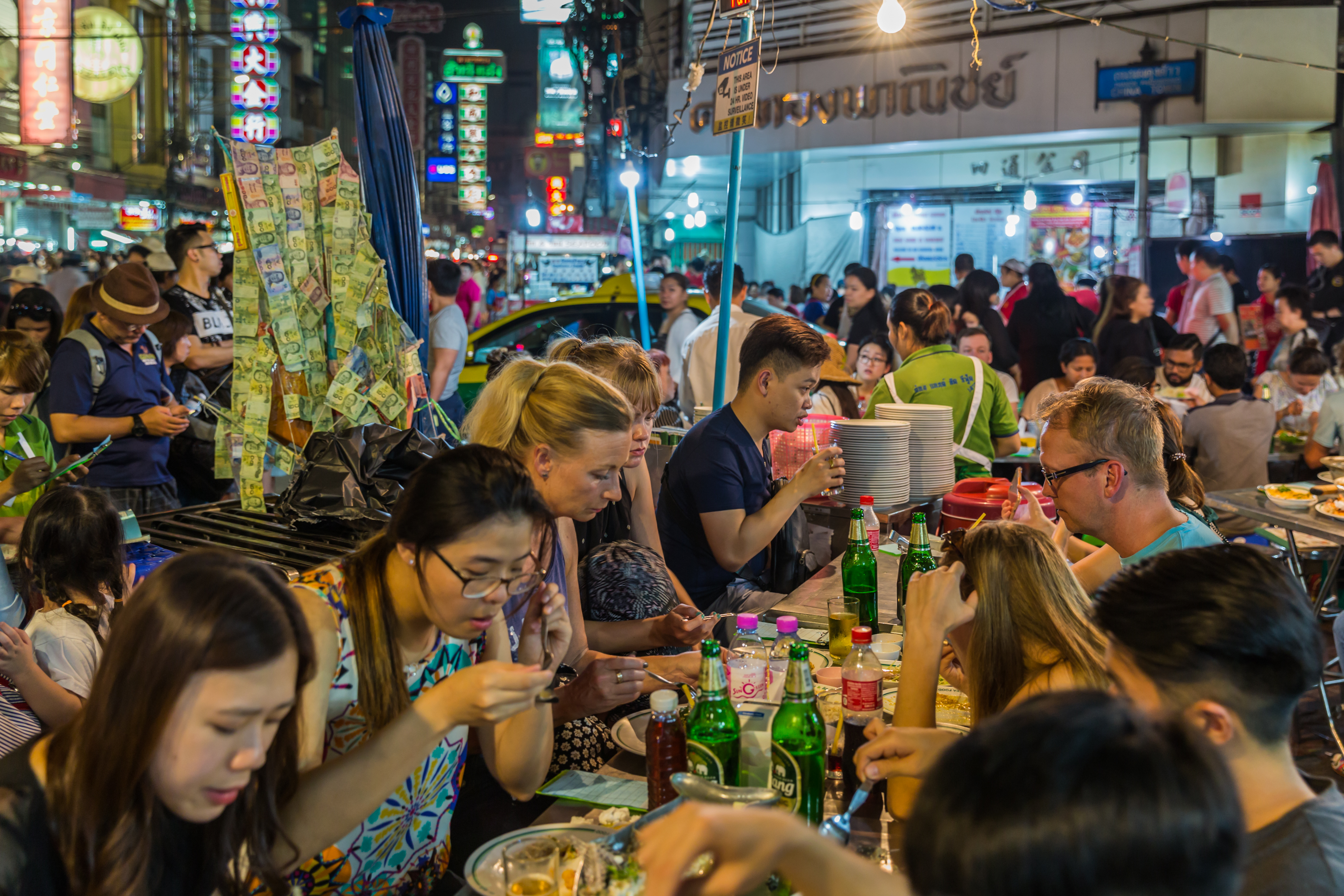
The vibrant nighttime atmosphere of Bangkok's Chinatown at the entrance to Phadung Dao Road on the Yaowarat side, where two grilled seafood street stalls are located.

Phadung Dao Road is well-known as a vibrant hub of various restaurants and street food vendors, especially at night. In addition to the previously mentioned suki restaurant, it also offers a wide range of other delicious options, such as oyster omelet, blanched and steamed clams, barbecued red pork in sweet gravy with rice, Hainanese chicken rice, crocodile and chevon stewed with Chinese herb, and traditional Chinese sweet dragon's beard candy. At the entrance where it intersects with Yaowarat Road, there are two particularly popular side-by-side grilled seafood street stalls that are longtime local favorites.

== See more ==
- Plaeng Nam Road – a counterpart road
