= Chaloem Buri =

Area of Samphanthawong district, Bangkok, Thailand

Coordinates: 13°44′21.98″N 100°30′41.27″E

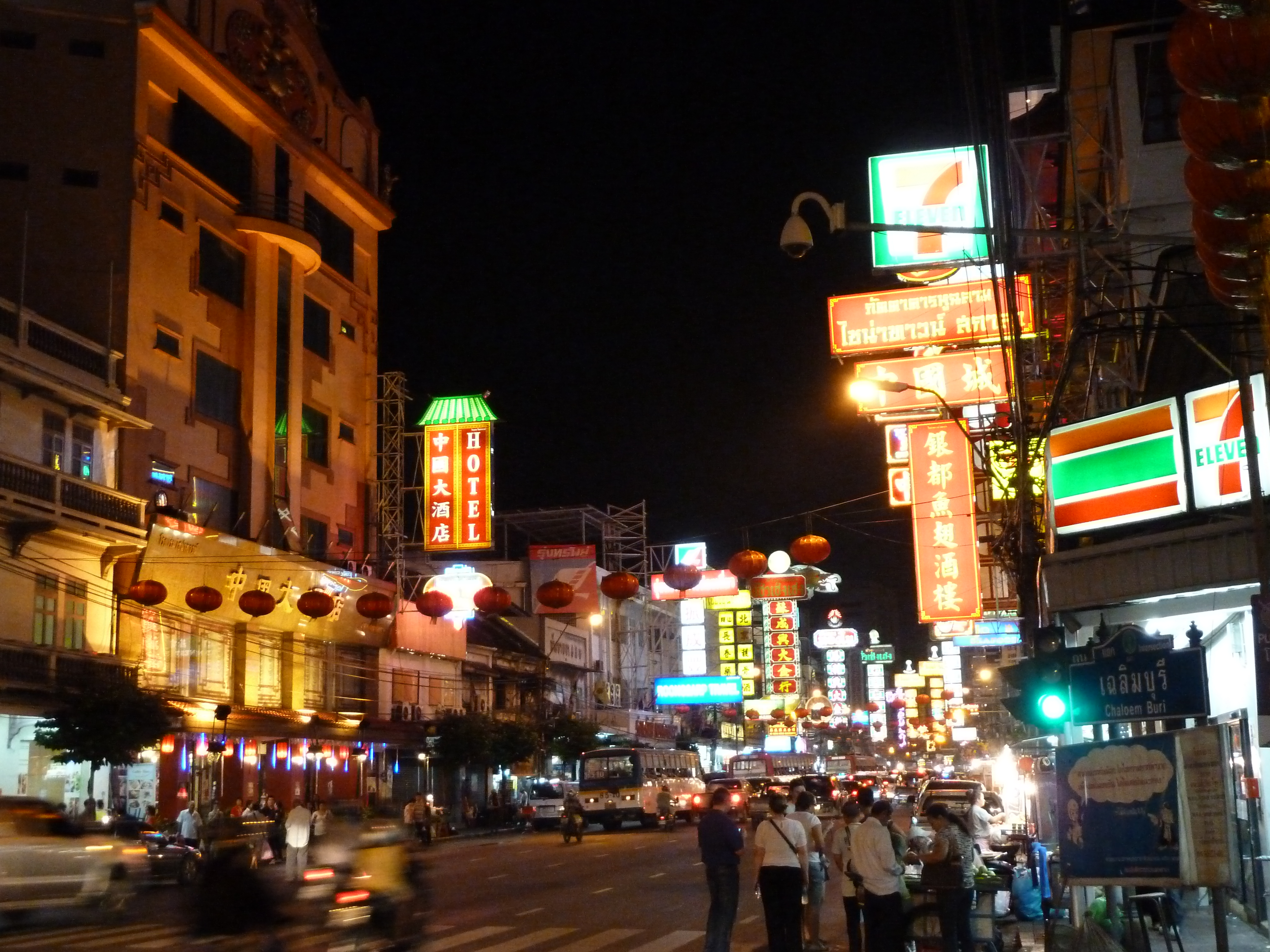
Chaloem Buri at night

Chaloem Buri (Thai: เฉลิมบุรี, pronounced [t͡ɕʰā.lɤ̌ːm bū.rīː]) is the area south of the intersection of Yaowarat and Songsawat Roads in Bangkok's Samphanthawong District.

Chaloem Buri is considered as the second intersection of Yaowarat from nearby Odeon Circle, and parallel to Mo Mi on Charoen Krung side. Its name comes from the name of a cinema, it was in the area on Songsawat Road. Originally, the cinema was named "Singapore" before it was demolished and rebuilt in 1932 along with the Sala Chalermkrung Royal Theatre in the occasion of 150th anniversary celebration of Rattanakosin (Bangkok) and renamed "Chaloem Buri" (lit. 'celebrate the city').

Nowadays, the area around Chaloem Buri is home to many hotels including several restaurants with travel agency. At nighttime, there're also many street food stalls such as rad na, rice noodle roll and popia, yam, or grilled pathongko. They're very popular with tourists. In addition in the past, Chaloem Buri was also the location of the first pork satay restaurant in Thailand.

Chaloem Buri was used as the filming location for Lisa's MV Rockstar which was released on June 28, 2024, at 7:00 am (ICT). Just seven hours since it was published on YouTube, has created a phenomenon with over 12 million views and has caused people to flock to this intersection and Yaowarat to follow in her footsteps.

Since late 2023, the row of shophouses along Songsawat Road near the Charoen Krung side of Mo Mi, which sits on land owned by the Crown Property Bureau (CPB), was demolished for modern redevelopment. It briefly became the Chinatown Market Chaloem Buri night market, but after only a few months of operation, it was closed to make way for the Grande Centre Point Chinatown Hotel.

== See also ==
- Bangkok's Chinatown
