= Thian Fah Foundation Hospital =

Hospital in Bangkok, Thailand

Coordinates: 13°44′17.52″N 100°30′44.28″E

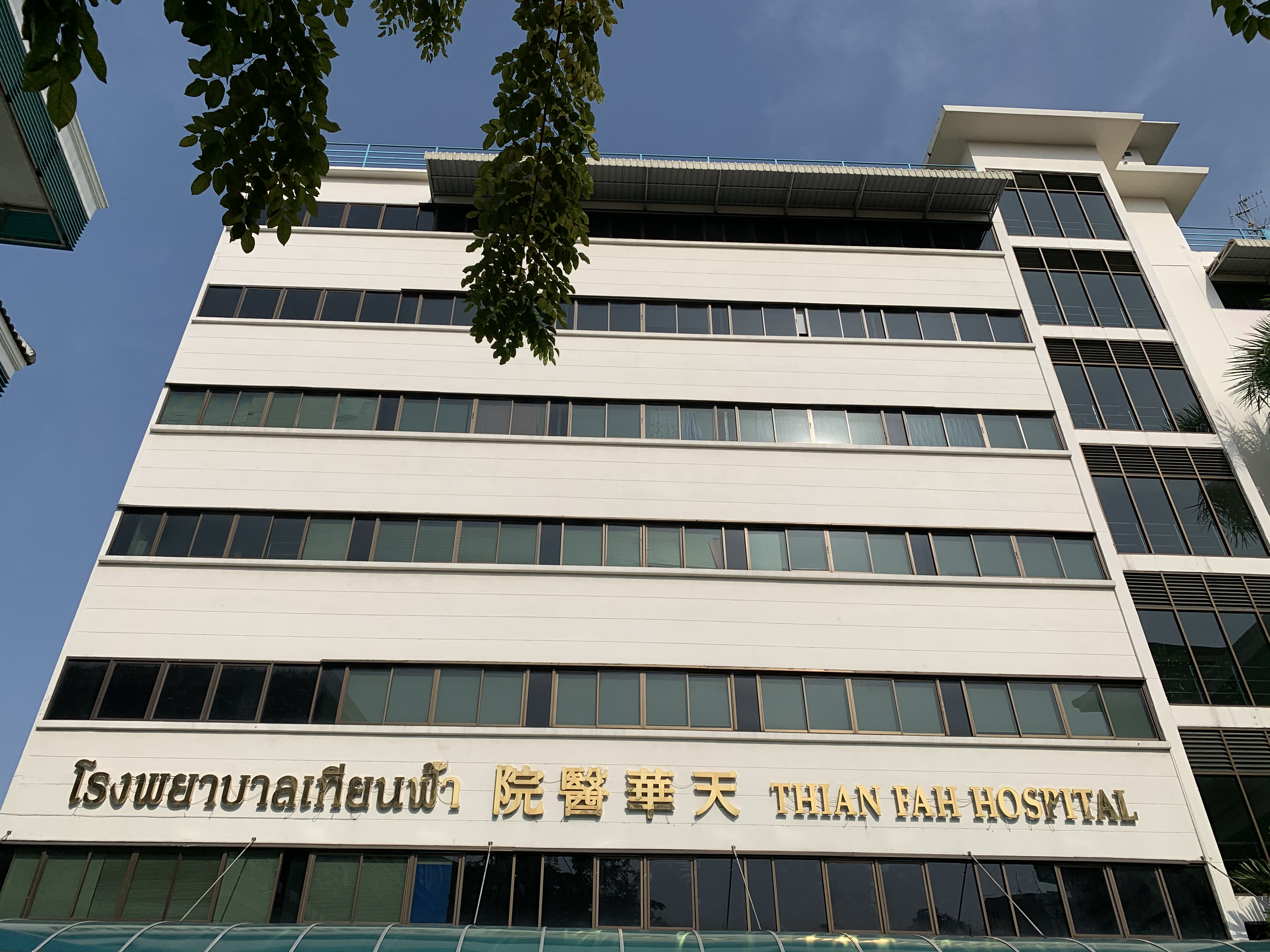
Thian Fah Hospital in Khet Samphanthawong

Thian Fah Foundation Hospital, shortened to Thian Fah Foundation (Thai: โรงพยาบาลเทียนฟ้ามูลนิธิ, เทียนฟ้ามูลนิธิ; traditional Chinese: 天華醫院; simplified Chinese: 天华医院; pinyin: Tiān huá yī yuàn), is the first foundation and private hospital in Thailand, including shrine. Located at 606 Yaowarat Road, Samphanthawong Subdistrict, Samphanthawong District, Bangkok near Wat Traimit, Odeon Circle and Chaloem Buri Intersection.

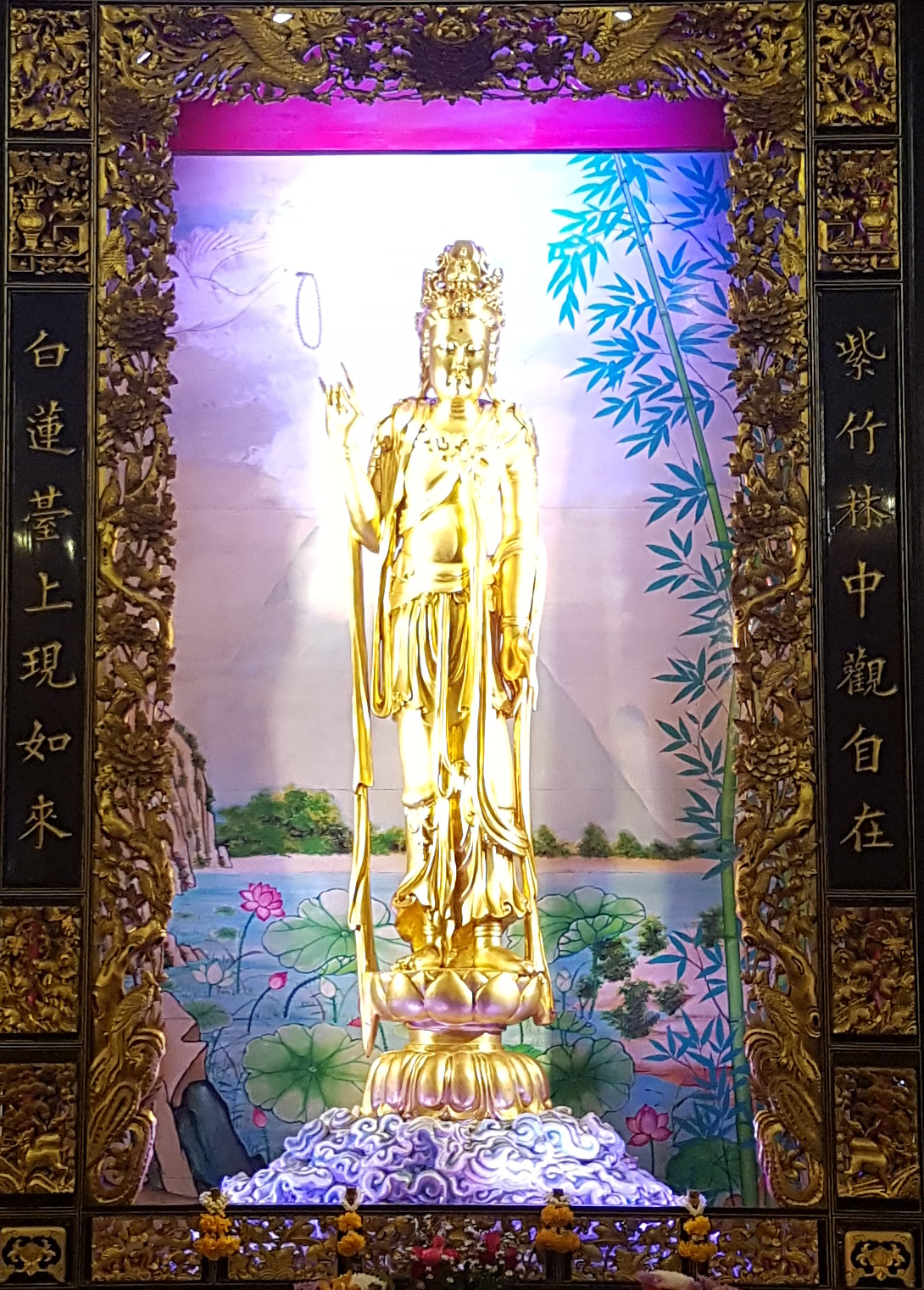
Golden Guanyin statue

It was established during the reign of King Chulalongkorn (Rama V) in 1903 and completed in 1905. This was due to the merge of five Chinese dialect groups with the intention of helping the poor who could not afford medication at that time. They have both modern and traditional Chinese treatments and the foundation is preserved till today. There is a beauty statue of Bodhisattva Guanyin estimated to be about 800–900 years old since the Song dynasty. The statue was carved with the sandalwood and painted in gold. In 1958, it was invited from China and enshrined until today. This shrine open 24 hours and so popular among people both Thai and Chinese to pray for good health especially during Chinese New Year and some of them are teenagers to pray for the university entrance exam.
