= Odeon Circle =

Roundabout in Bangkok with Chinese-style gate

- 崇圣牌楼
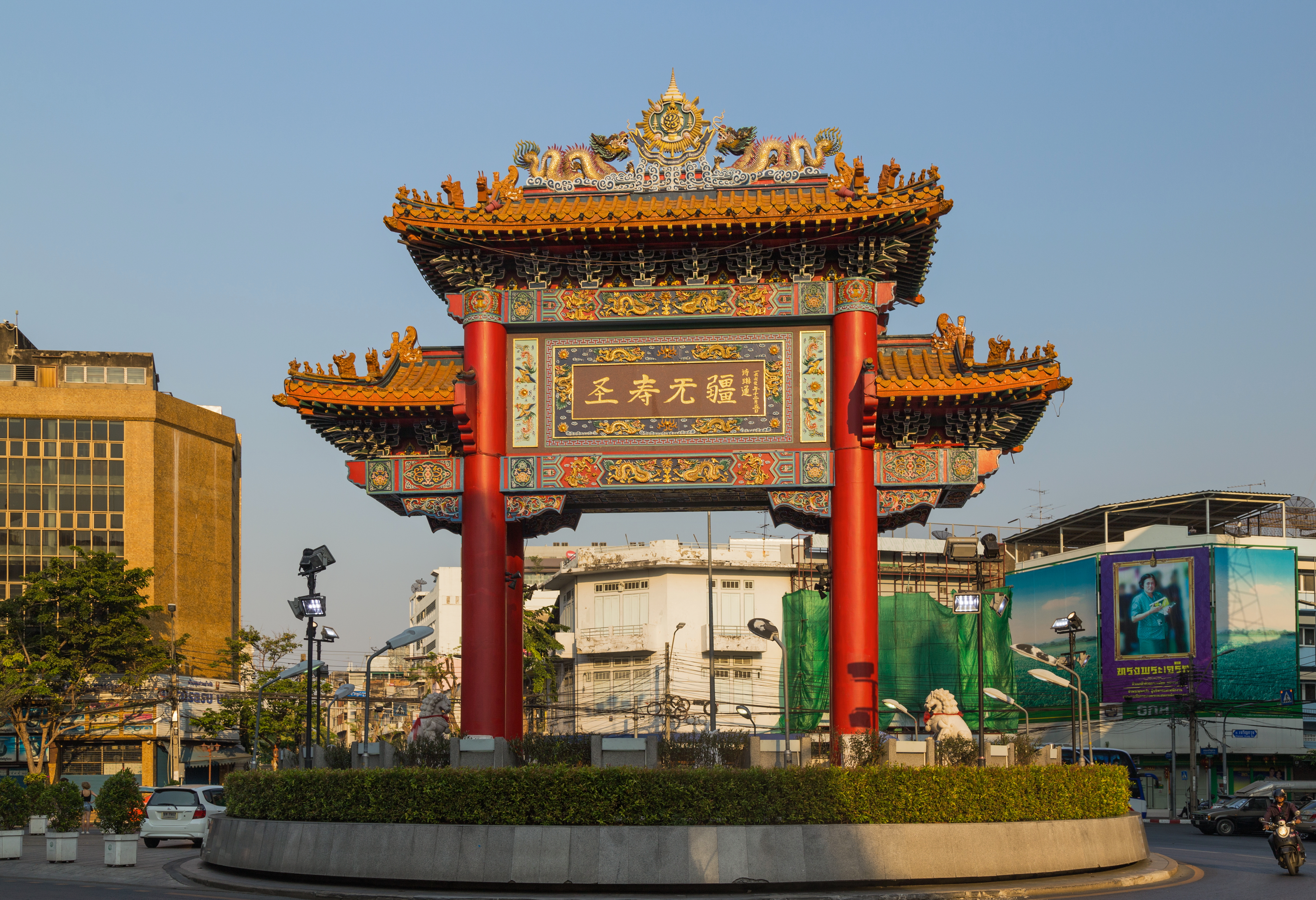
- Odeon Circle in 2016

General information
- Status: Completed
- Location: Intersection of Yaowarat Road, Charoen Krung Road, and Tri Mit Road (Mittaphap Thai–China Road), Samphanthawong District, Bangkok 10100, Thailand
- Coordinates: 13°44′14″N 100°30′47″E
- Construction started: 1999; 27 years ago
- Completed: 5 December 1999; 26 years ago
- Opened: 5 December 1999; 26 years ago

Design and construction
- Architect: Teochew Men.

Odeon Circle or Wongwian Odeon (Thai: วงเวียนโอเดียน, pronounced [wōŋ.wīan ʔōː.dîan], RTGS: Wongwian Odian; Chinese: 崇圣牌楼; pinyin: Chóng shèng páilóu) is a roundabout in Bangkok. It is the intersection of Yaowarat, Charoen Krung, and Tri Mit or Mittaphap Thai-China roads in Samphanthawong district. A red paifang, which was built by Thai Chinese descents as part of the celebrations of King Bhumibol's 72nd anniversary in 1999, is located at the centre of the circle. It is known as a gateway of Bangkok's Chinatown which Yaowarat as a main artery.

The circle gained its name from a movie theatre in the area, which in turn was named after a cinema of the same name in the United Kingdom. The theatre ceased operations in the late 1980s, and the site has since been transformed into a parking building. The roundabout's center originally had a fountain, until it was replaced by the Chinese gate in 1999. The top of the gate is inscribed in both Thai and Chinese letters on both sides, which means that "Gate of Commemorates the 6th Cycle Anniversary of HM the King's Birthday". The gate was officially opened on 5 December 1999 by Princess Sirindhorn presiding over the ceremony.

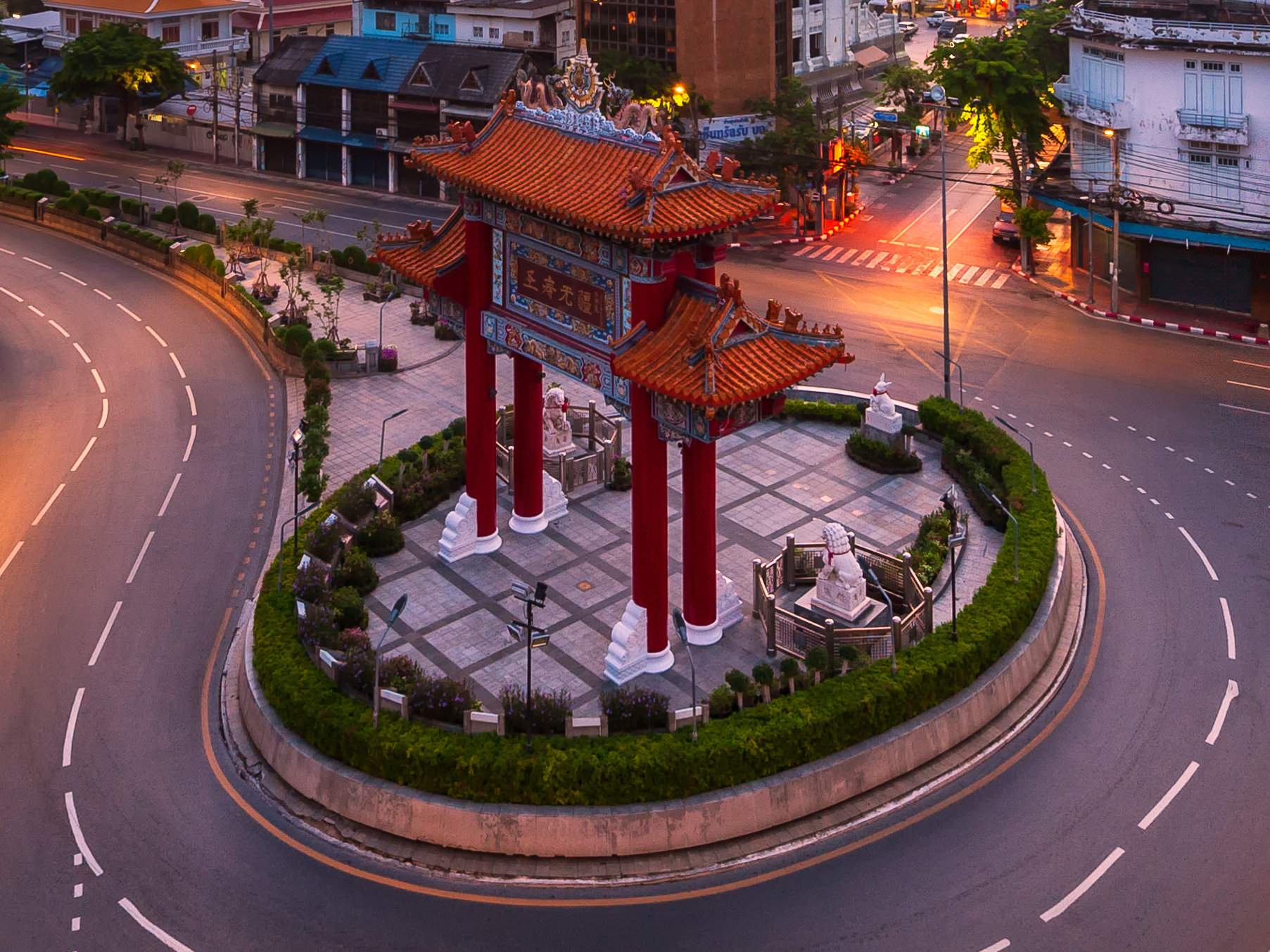
Odeon circle, as seen in 2018

On the ground floor of the roundabout. There is a brass plate with a Chinese inscription (地; de) that translates to "earth" or "soil" and at the same point. At the top there is another Chinese inscription (天; tiān) means "heaven" or "sky". According to the belief of the Chinese. If anyone is standing at this point, that person will be given the cosmic energy according to faith in Feng Shui.

On the side of the gate, there are two lion statues made from white jade, which was given by the government of China as part of the celebrations of King Bhumibol's 80th anniversary in 2007. The male lion puts his right foot on a ball, while the lioness puts her left foot on a cub. There is also a rabbit statue made of white jade in front of the gate, it was sent from government of China in 2011 as part of the celebrations of King Bhumibol's 84th anniversary, because he was born in the year of the Rabbit.

Odeon Circle was dubbed "Dragon Head" because it was the beginning of Yaowarat, which it was called "Dragon Road". It's a symbolic and one of the landmarks of Bangkok's Chinatown and also an emblem of Samphanthawong district office.

== Neighbouring places ==
- Wat Traimit and Golden Buddha
- Samitivej Chinatown Hospital
- Dragon Head Building
- Thian Fah Foundation Hospital and Guan Yin Shrine
- Chaloem Buri Intersection
