= Yaowarat Road =

Road in Bangkok, Thailand

Yaowarat Road ~ 耀華力路
- ถนนเยาวราช 耀華力路
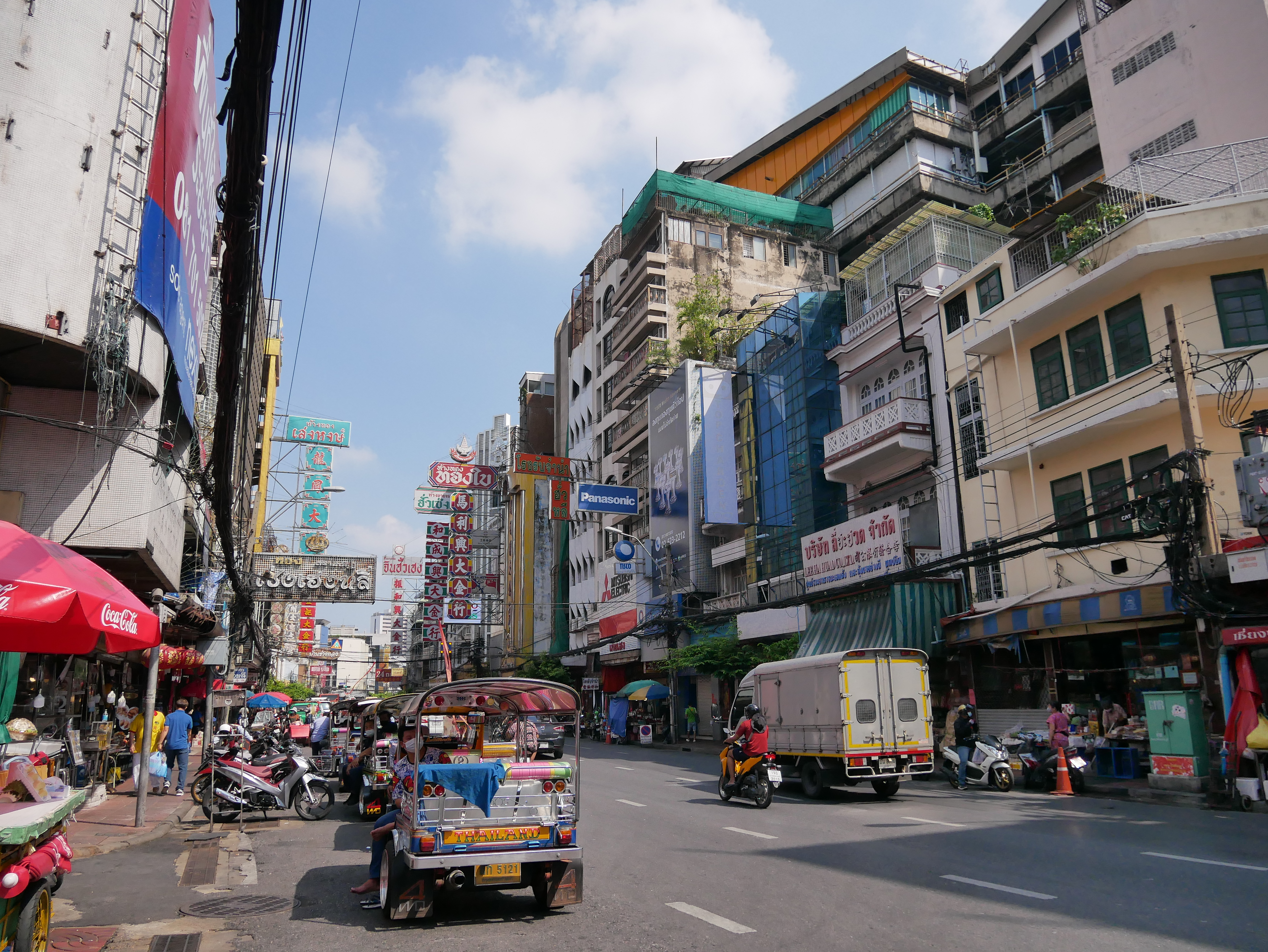
- Yaowarat Road in the Old Market area in 2021
- Length: 1,532 m (5,026 ft)
- Location: Khwaeng Samphanthawong and Khwaeng Chakkrawat, Khet Samphanthawong, Khwaeng Wang Burapha Phirom, Khet Phra Nakhon, Bangkok
- Postal code: 10100
- Coordinates: 13.741136°N 100.508305°E
- East end: Charoen Krung Road
- Major junctions: Odeon Circle; Chaloem Buri; Ratchawong; Wat Tuek; Wang Burapha
- West end: Maha Chai Road
- East: Charoen Krung Road
- West: Maha Chai Road

Yaowarat Road (Thai: ถนนเยาวราช, romanized: Thanon Yaowarat, pronounced [tʰā.nǒn jāw.wā.râːt]; Chinese: 耀華力路) in Samphanthawong District is the main artery of Bangkok's Chinatown. Modern Chinatown now covers a large area around Yaowarat and Charoen Krung Road. It has been the main centre for trading by the Chinese community since they moved from their old site some 200 years ago to make way for the construction of Wat Phra Kaew, the Grand Palace. Nearby is the Phahurat or Little India. The area is bordered by the Chao Phraya River from the west to the south. Yaowarat Road is well known for its variety of foodstuffs, and at night turns into a large "food street" that draws tourists and locals from all over the city.

== History ==
Chinatown is in one of the oldest areas of Bangkok. It is the result of the resettlement of Chinese on the west bank of Chao Phraya River after King Rama I moved the capital of the kingdom from Thonburi to Rattanakosin. From there Chinese traders operated maritime junk trade between (Siam) and China throughout the Rattanakosin period. By the end of 1891, King Rama V had ordered the construction of many roads, including Yaowarat Road. The areas that will become these roads were previously rice fields and canals. Chinatown does not consist of only Yaowarat Road, but also includes others such as Charoen Krung Road, Mangkon Road, Songwat Road, Songsawat Road, Ratchawong Road, and Chakkrawat Road. Yaowarat's Sampheng Market is the center of the area. The path of the road is said to resemble a dragon's curvy body, making it an auspicious location for business. Since it was built to avoid the existing cluster of houses of the people according the king's policy. Yaowarat is a road with a length of about 1.5 km (0.93 mi), 20 m (65 ft) wide and takes 8 years to build (1892–1900). There are many shops selling gold, garments, textiles, stationery, souvenirs, second-hand parts and equipment, electric goods, computer parts, antiques, imported musical instruments and local delicacies. Based on 2002, there were a total of 40 gold shops and a total of 132 shops in Chinatown, considered as the area with the most gold shops in the world. Therefore, it was dubbed as "Golden Road" in tandem "Dragon Road".

Land prices around Yaowarat Road have always been among the most expensive in Bangkok and Thailand due to limited land which is mostly owned by prominent Thai-Chinese families.

This road was originally named "Yuppharat Road" and later changed to "Yaowarat Road", which means "young king", in honour to Prince Vajirunhis, the first crown prince of Thailand, who was the first son of King Rama V. Before it was a road, it was just rice fields and canals. In 1894, an electric tram car service passed through Charoen Krung and Yaowarat Roads, this service only ceased in 1968. Prior World War II, regarded as the busiest area in Bangkok, it was the first road where the country's tallest buildings where situated, called seven-storeyed and nine-storeyed buildings on both sides of the road. There were many famous Chinese restaurants, Chaloem Buri Cinema the most modern one in that decade, many reliable gold shops as well as hundred of shops selling both fresh and preserved merchandised used for Chinese food cooking. At present, Yaowarat's significance is not fading. It is still one of the country's most busting commercial and delicious food district.

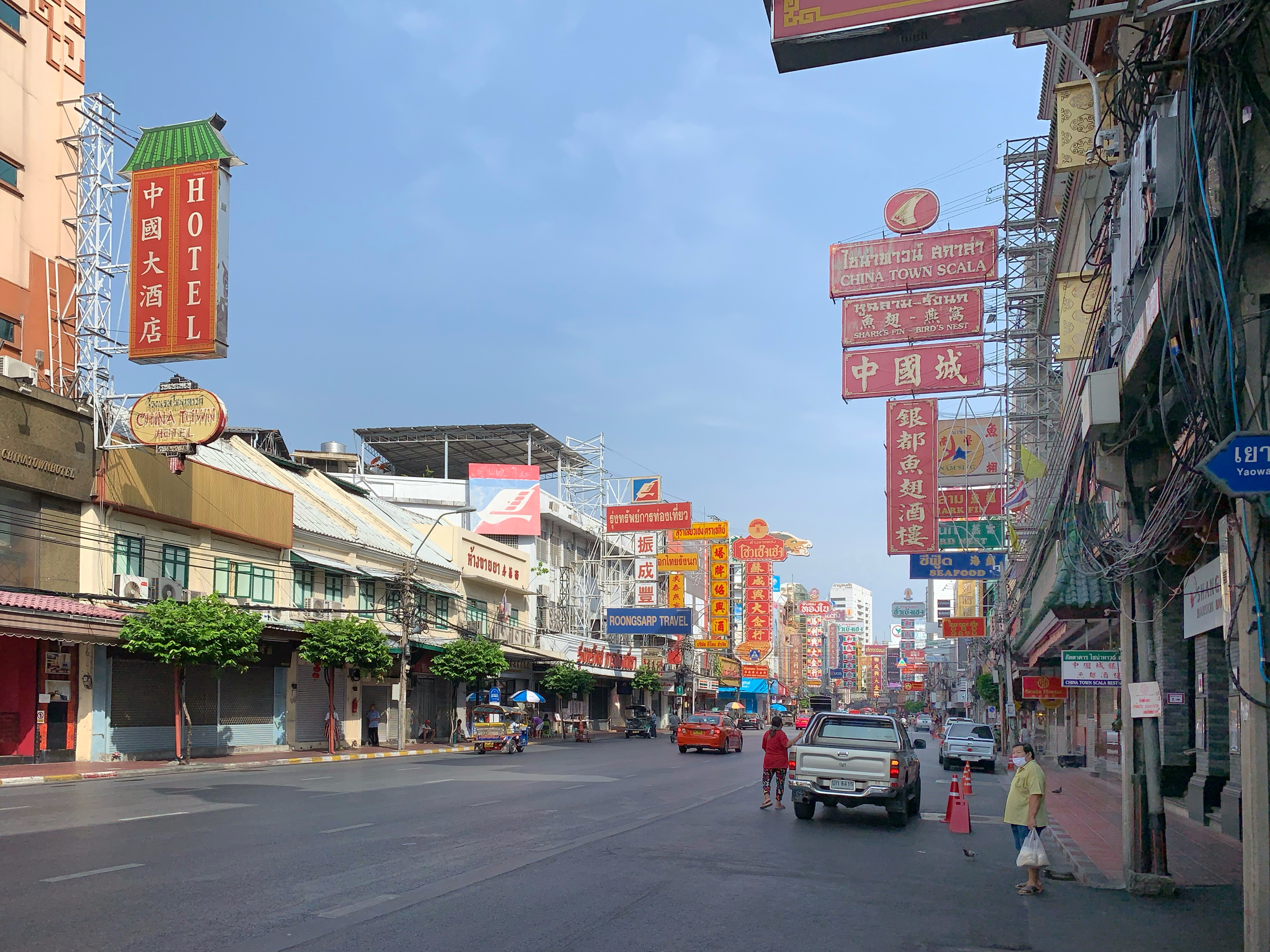
Yaowarat Road in May 2020

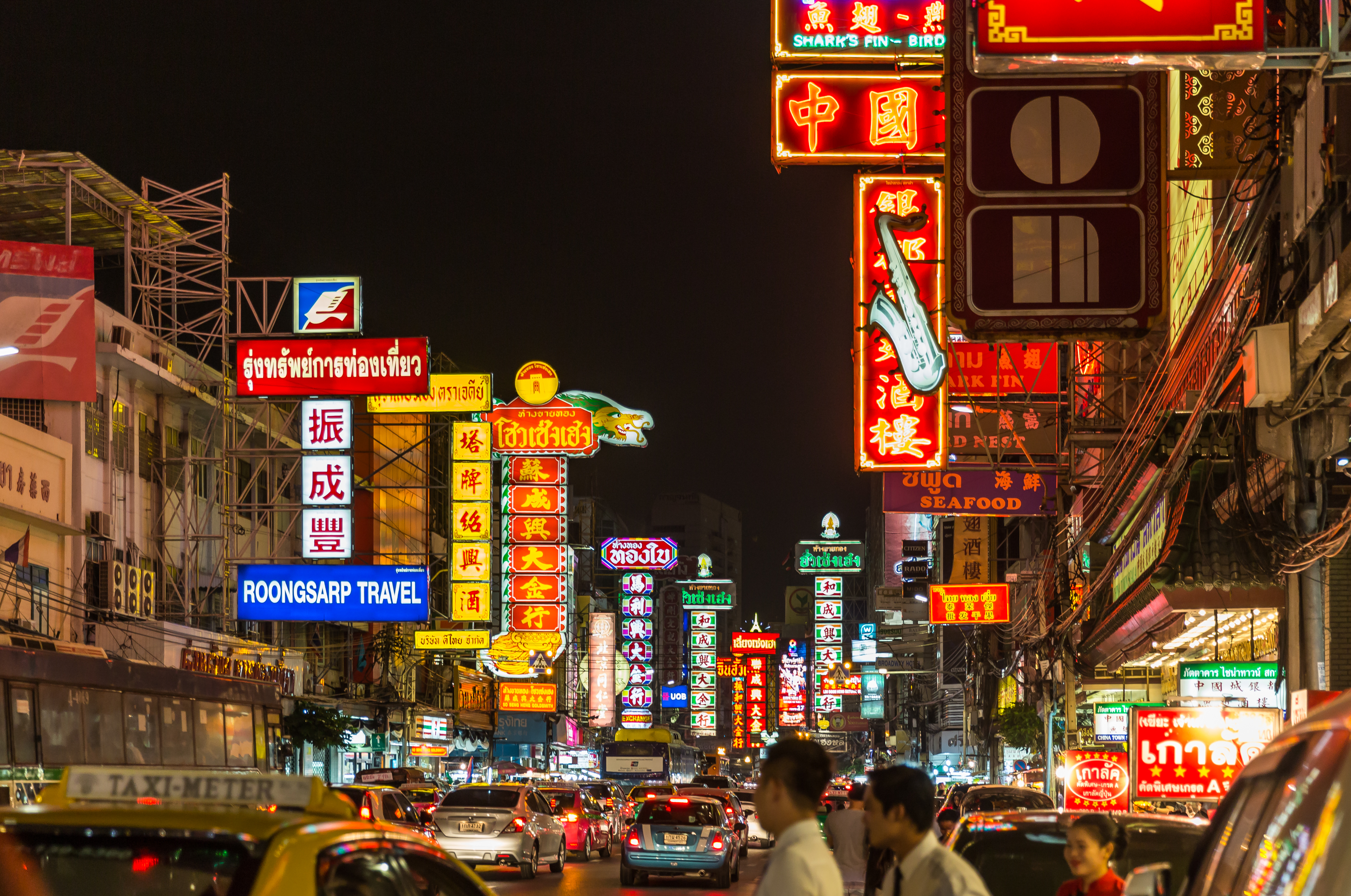
Yaowarat Road at night

On Monday 3 June 1946, King Rama VIII and his younger brother, Prince Bhumibol (later King Rama IX), visited Yaowarat and Sampheng by walking from morning until noon. This event is considered a milestone of Yaowarat and causing conflicts between Thais and Thais of Chinese descent, including overseas Chinese who live in Thailand to end.

On Saturday 6 July 2024, at about 8:41 pm, a fire broke out in the Trok Pho community, a narrow lane separated from Yaowarat Road near Guanyin Shrine and Sampheng, burning out a number of houses, injuring two firefighters, and at least 30 people were affected.

Nowadays, during every Chinese New Year festival, Yaowarat Road becomes a vibrant venue for grand celebrations. The road is closed to traffic and transformed into a full pedestrian street. Princess Sirindhorn has regularly presided over the opening ceremony.

== Characteristics ==
Yaowarat is a road with a total length of 1,532 m (5,026.2 ft), managed as a one-way street running in the opposite direction to the parallel Charoen Krung Road. It starts at the Odeon Circle near Wat Traimit, or Temple of the Golden Buddha, crosses the Khlong Ong Ang, and ends at the Wang Burapha Intersection in front of the Wang Burapha area in Phra Nakhon District.

== Transportation ==
Several bus lines run through Yaowarat, such as 3-35 (1), 3-36 (4), 4-36 (7), 3-7E (25), 4-39 (40), and 2-9 (53). There are four bus stops located along the road: Thian Fah Foundation Hospital, Chaloem Buri, Talat Kao (Old Market), and Wat Tuek.

The road is also served by Wat Mangkon Station of the MRT Blue Line, which runs underneath nearby Charoen Krung Road.
