= Charoen Krung Road =

Road in Bangkok

Coordinates: 13°44′50″N 100°29′40″E

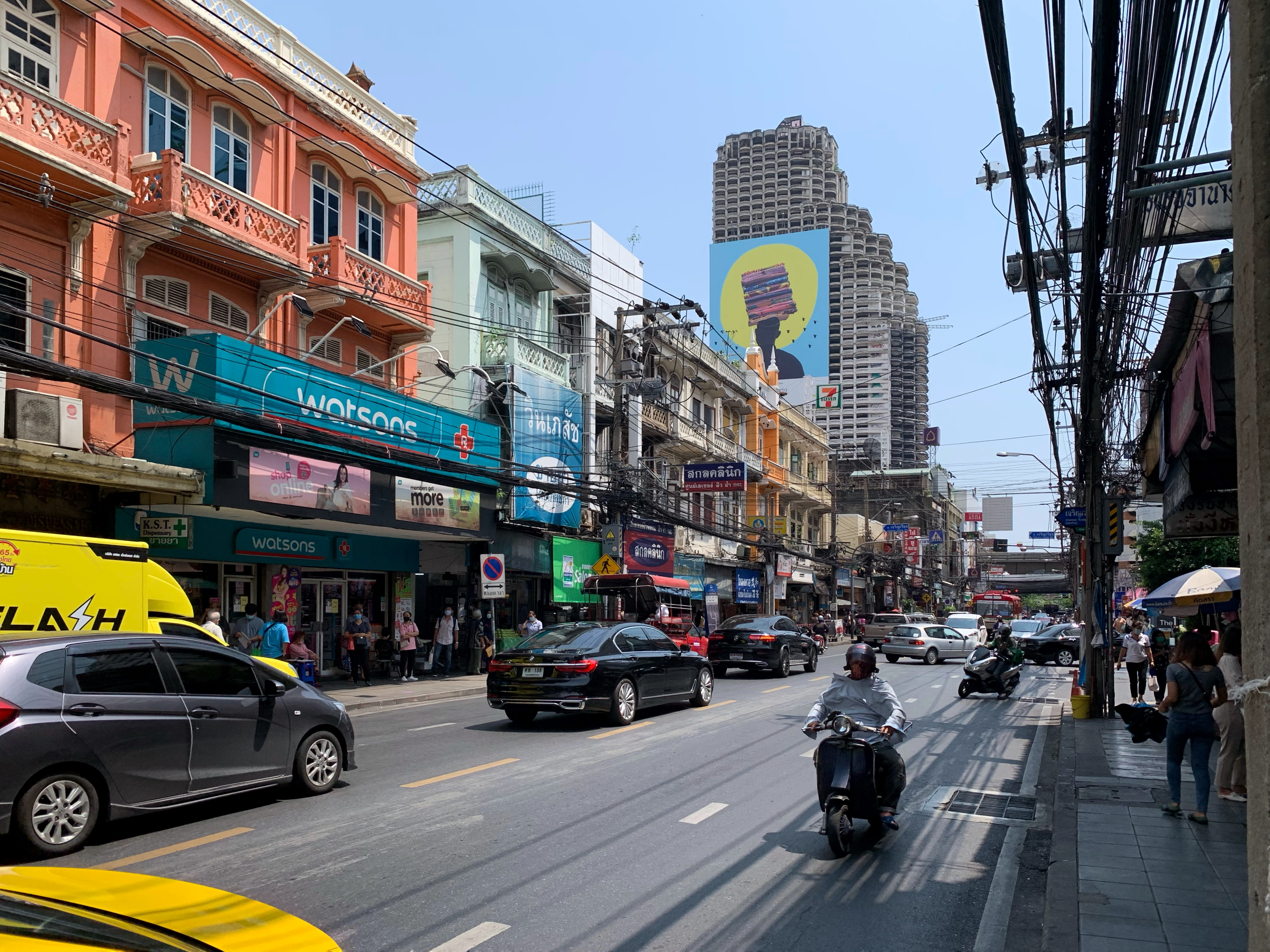
Shophouses along Charoen Krung road with the Sathorn Unique Tower in the vicinity (2021)

Charoen Krung Road (Thai: ถนนเจริญกรุง, romanized: Thanon Charoen Krung, pronounced [tʰā.nǒn tɕā.rɤ̄ːn krūŋ]) is a major road in Bangkok and the first in Thailand to be built using modern construction methods. Built during 1862–1864 in the reign of King Mongkut (Rama IV), it runs from the old city centre in Rattanakosin Island, passes through Bangkok's Chinatown, continues into Bang Rak district, where it formerly served the community of European expatriates, and ends in Bang Kho Laem. Construction of the road marked a major change in Bangkok's urban development, with the major mode of transport shifting from water to land. Charoen Krung Road was Bangkok's main street up to the early 20th century, but later declined in prominence. It is still home to many historic buildings and neighbourhoods, which are beset by changes as extension of the underground MRT is poised to drive new development.

== History ==
Until the mid-19th century, the primary means of transport in Bangkok (and Siam in general) was by boat. This began to change as the country opened up to Western ideas and influences, and underwent modernization during the reign of King Mongkut (Rama IV, r. 1851–1868). The signing of the Bowring Treaty in 1855 marked the beginning of increasing Western political and economic influence, and many foreigners set up diplomatic missions, trading companies and residences on the east bank of the Chao Phraya River, just beyond the newly expanded city limits marked by Phadung Krung Kasem Canal, which had been dug in 1851.

... the foreign consuls all signed their names to a petition which they presented to the King. It said that the Europeans were used to going out in the open air, riding carriages or riding horseback for pleasure. These activities had been good for their health and they had not suffered from illnesses. Since their coming to live in Bangkok, they had found that there were no roads to go riding in carriages or on horseback for pleasure, and they had all been sick very often.

The King, after having heard the contents of this petition, reflected that recently the Europeans had been coming to live in Bangkok in increasing numbers every year. Their countries had roads that made every village or town look orderly, pleasant and clean. Our country was greatly overgrown with grass or climbers; our pathways were but small or blind alleys; our larger pathways were dirty, muddy, or soiled, and unpleasant to look at.

— The Royal Chronicles

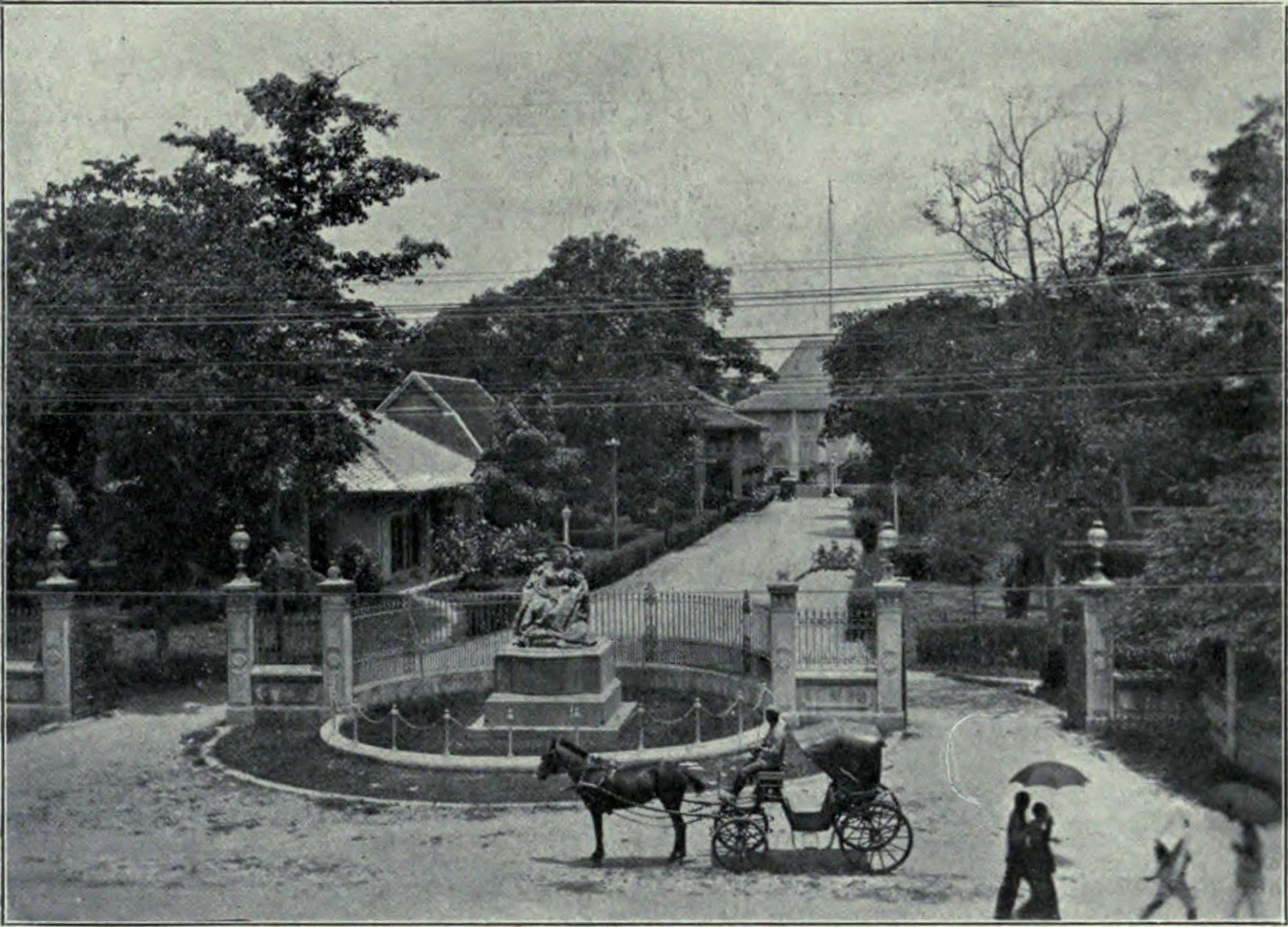
The British legation (pictured c. 1908) was among the European diplomatic missions which came to be served by Charoen Krung Road.

On 19 August 1861, Western consuls, complaining of ill health due to a lack of roads in which they could travel by horse-drawn carriage, requested that the King build a new road on the east side of the river behind the consulates and businesses. The King agreed to the request, and ordered the construction of a new system of roads. The first, which would serve the European district, was begun in 1862 and officially opened to traffic on 16 March 1864. At the time, roads were not officially named, and the road became known as Thanon Mai (ถนนใหม่) or New Road. King Mongkut later gave it the name Charoen Krung, which means "prosperous city" or "prosperity of the city".

The road, constructed in two phases, runs roughly parallel to the Chao Phraya River in a southerly direction from the city centre. The first section ran from the old city moat, crossed Phadung Krumg Kasem Canal, and continued through the European district to end in Bang Kho Laem, where the river made a sharp turn to the east. The second phase, within the old city walls, ran from Wat Pho to meet the earlier section at Saphan Lek ("iron bridge"). When the road was first built, locals remarked of its size and width that there just weren't enough people to walk such large a street. In fact, only one side of the road was regularly used until it was renovated and paved with asphalt in 1922.

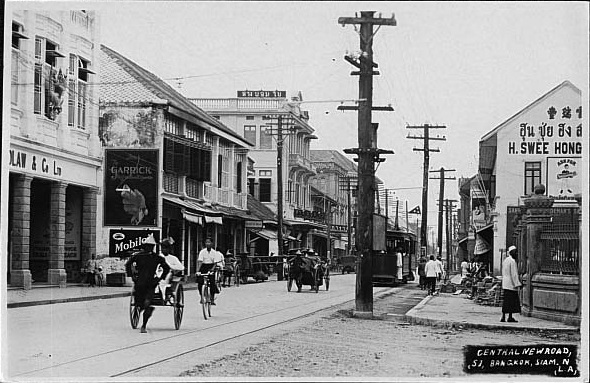
Postcard of Charoen Krung Road, c. 1910s–1920s

The construction of Charoen Krung Road—together with Bamrung Mueang, built shortly after—marked a major change in Bangkok's urban landscape. Land transport soon overtook canals in importance, and the growth of the city now followed roads instead. Charoen Krung remained the city's main road and largest thoroughfare up to the early 20th century, when development expanded in-land along the direction of Bamrung Mueang instead. The city's first tram line began operation on Charoen Krung in 1888. Originally horse-drawn, the tram was electrified in 1894. The service ran until its discontinuation in 1963.

Charoen Krung's importance gradually declined as the city's rapid expansion in the latter half of the 20th century drew real estate development elsewhere. The southern section, although the site of many historic buildings, has lagged in economic potential; up to 20 percent of its commercial buildings were unoccupied in 2013. Lately, in an attempt at urban renewal, there have been efforts to promote the southern Charoen Krung neighbourhood as the Charoenkrung Creative District. Meanwhile, construction of the Blue Line extension of Bangkok's MRT system, which runs directly under Charoen Krung as it passes through the Chinatown and Rattnakaosin areas, has raised concerns that historic communities are being displaced by development.

== Places ==
Map showing Charoen Krung Road in red

Charoen Krung Road runs for 8.6 kilometres (5.3 mi) through the districts of Phra Nakhon, Pom Prap Sattru Phai and Samphanthawong (dividing the two), Bang Rak, Sathon and Bang Kho Laem. It begins at Sanam Chai Road, at the corners of the Grand Palace, Wat Pho, Saranrom Park and the Territorial Defense Command headquarters. It heads east through the Rattanakosin Island, crossing the inner moat at Saphan Mon ("Mon Bridge"), and passes the Ban Mo and Wang Burapha neighbourhoods, as well as the Sala Chalermkrung Royal Theatre.

The road crosses Khlong Ong Ang (the outer moat) at Damrong Sathit Bridge, which is the site of the Saphan Lek market. From here, it serves Bangkok's Chinatown, running southeast, roughly parallel to Yaowarat Road. It passes the historic S.A.B. Intersection near the areas of Nakhon Khasem (Thieves' Market) and Khlong Thom, as well as the Chinese temple Wat Mangkon Kamalawat. The road continues straight until it meets Rama IV Road at Mo Mi Junction, where it bends slightly south. From near the road's beginning at Sanam Chai to Mo Mi Junction, the extension of the MRT's Blue Line runs beneath Charoen Krung, and serves its neighbourhoods via Sam Yot and Wat Mangkon stations, which opened in 2019.

From Mo Mi Junction, Charoen Krung heads south to meet Yaowarat Road at the Odeon Circle, where the Chinatown Gate and Wat Traimit are located. The road then passes the neighbourhood of Talat Noi, before crossing Phadung Krung Kasem Canal at Phitthayasathian Bridge.

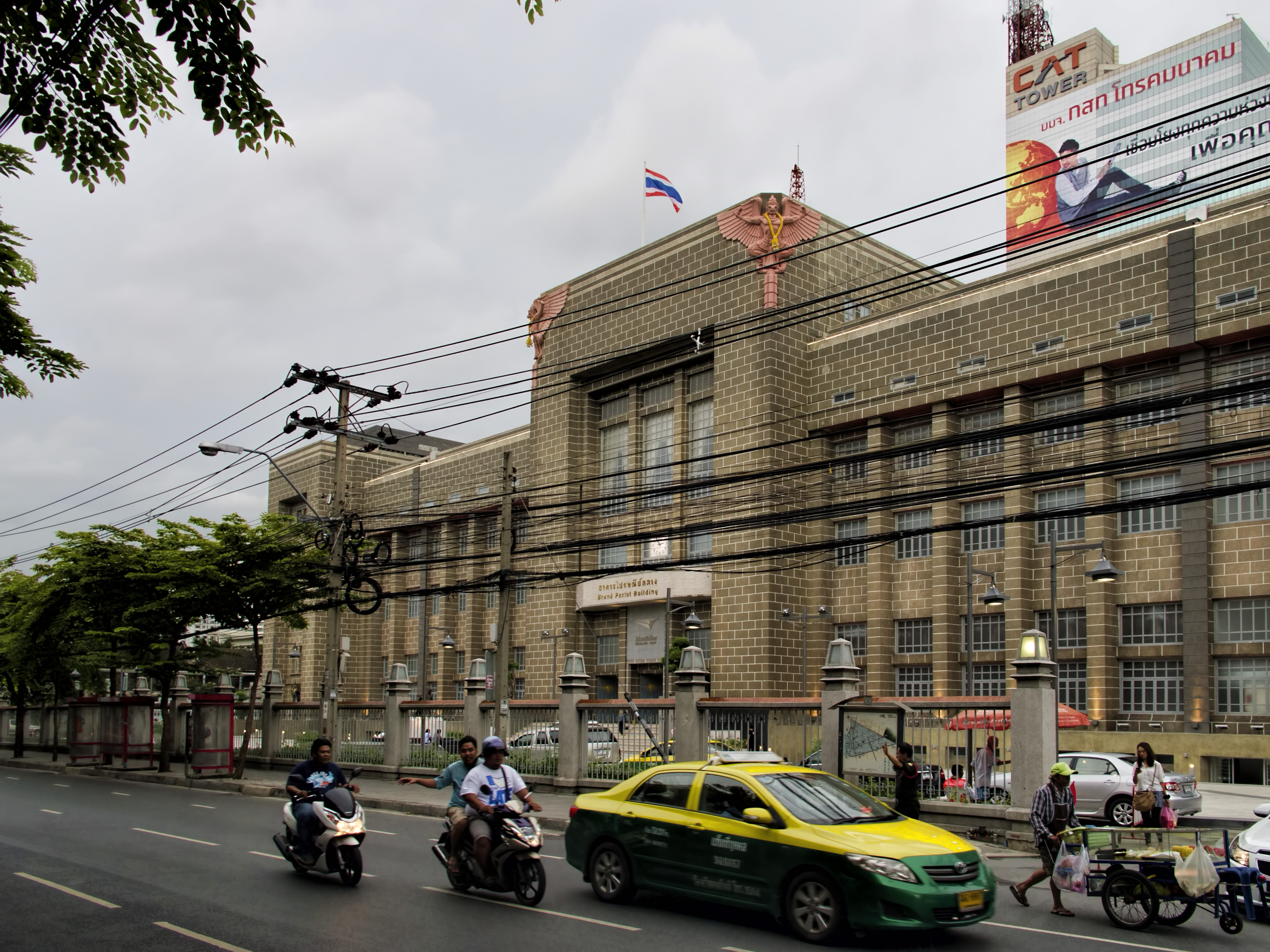
The General Post Office building stands on the former site of the British legation.

Here, the road enters Bang Rak District and runs along the former European quarter of Bang Rak Subdistrict, branching off to historic side-streets (soi) such as Soi Charoen Krung 30 (Captain Bush Lane, location of the Portuguese embassy), Soi Charoen Krung 36 ("Rue de Brest", named to commemorate diplomatic relations with France, whose embassy is located here, along with the Customs House and Haroon Mosque), and Soi Charoen Krung 40 (Soi Burapha, location of the Oriental Hotel, Assumption Cathedral, the Catholic Mission and Assumption College). The General Post Office building is located on the corner of Soi Charoen Krung 32, and Soi 42/1 is home to Wat Suan Phlu and the Shangri-La Hotel.

As it passes through Bang Rak, Charoen Krung meets several roads branching off to the northeast, running parallel to each other. Built during the turn of the 19th–20th centuries as the city expanded southward following the development around Charoen Krung, these roads are Si Phraya, Surawong, Si Lom and Sathon. The latter two form Bangkok's financial district, and on the corner of Charoen Krung and Si Lom stands the State Tower.

Charoen Krung meets Sathon Road under the ramps of Taksin Bridge, near the Saphan Taksin Station of the BTS Skytrain. From here, it enters Sathon District, where it passes Wat Yan Nawa, Sathorn Unique Tower, the Bangkok Dock Company and Wat Suthiwararam School. As the road enters Bang Kho Laem District, the area becomes mostly residential. It passes Shrewsbury International School, the Protestant Cemetery, and the Asiatique night market. The final stretch of Charoen Krung Road, after it intersects Rama III Road under Rama III Bridge, is known as Thanon Tok (ถนนตก, "falling road"), a reference to the fact that if the road continued on, it would fall into the river. At the end of the road, adjacent to Charoenkrung Pracharak Hospital, is the Yan Nawa office of the Metropolitan Electricity Authority, where one of Bangkok's former trams is preserved as a tourist attraction.

== See also ==
- History of Bangkok
