= Wat Pathum Khongkha =

Buddhist temple in Bangkok, Thailand

Wat Pathum Khongkha Ratchaworawihan
- วัดปทุมคงคาราชวรวิหาร
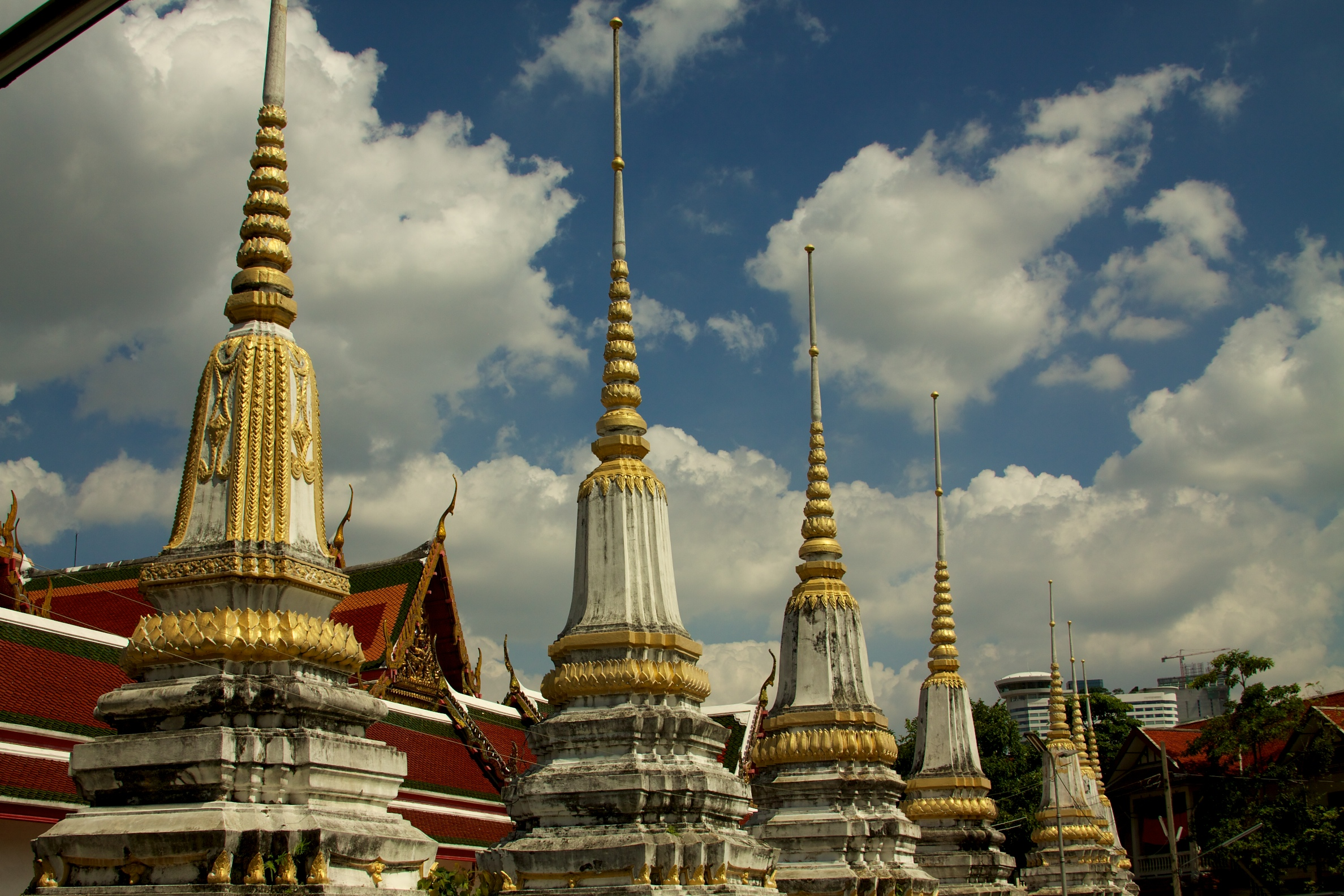
- Stupas at the temple

- Location within Thailand

Religion
- Affiliation: Buddhism
- Sect: Theravāda; Mahā Nikāya

Location
- Location: 1620 Song Wat Rd, Samphanthawong, Samphanthawong, Bangkok
- Country: Thailand
- Interactive map of Wat Pathum Khongkha Ratchaworawihan
- Coordinates: 13°44′11″N 100°30′39″E

Architecture
- Type: Wat
- Style: Thai

Wat Pathum Khongkha Ratchaworawihan, simply known as Wat Pathum Khongkha (Thai: วัดปทุมคงคาราชวรวิหาร, วัดปทุมคงคา), is a second-class royal temple in the Talat Noi area of Bangkok's Chinatown, in Thailand.

The temple dates to the Ayutthaya period, when it was called Wat Sampheng, from its location in Sampheng. Prince Maha Sura Singhanat, younger brother of King Rama I of the Rattanakosin period, renovated the temple, renaming it Wat Pathum Khongkha.
