= Khlong Ong Ang =

Canal in Bangkok, Thailand

Khlong Ong Ang (คลองโอ่งอ่าง)
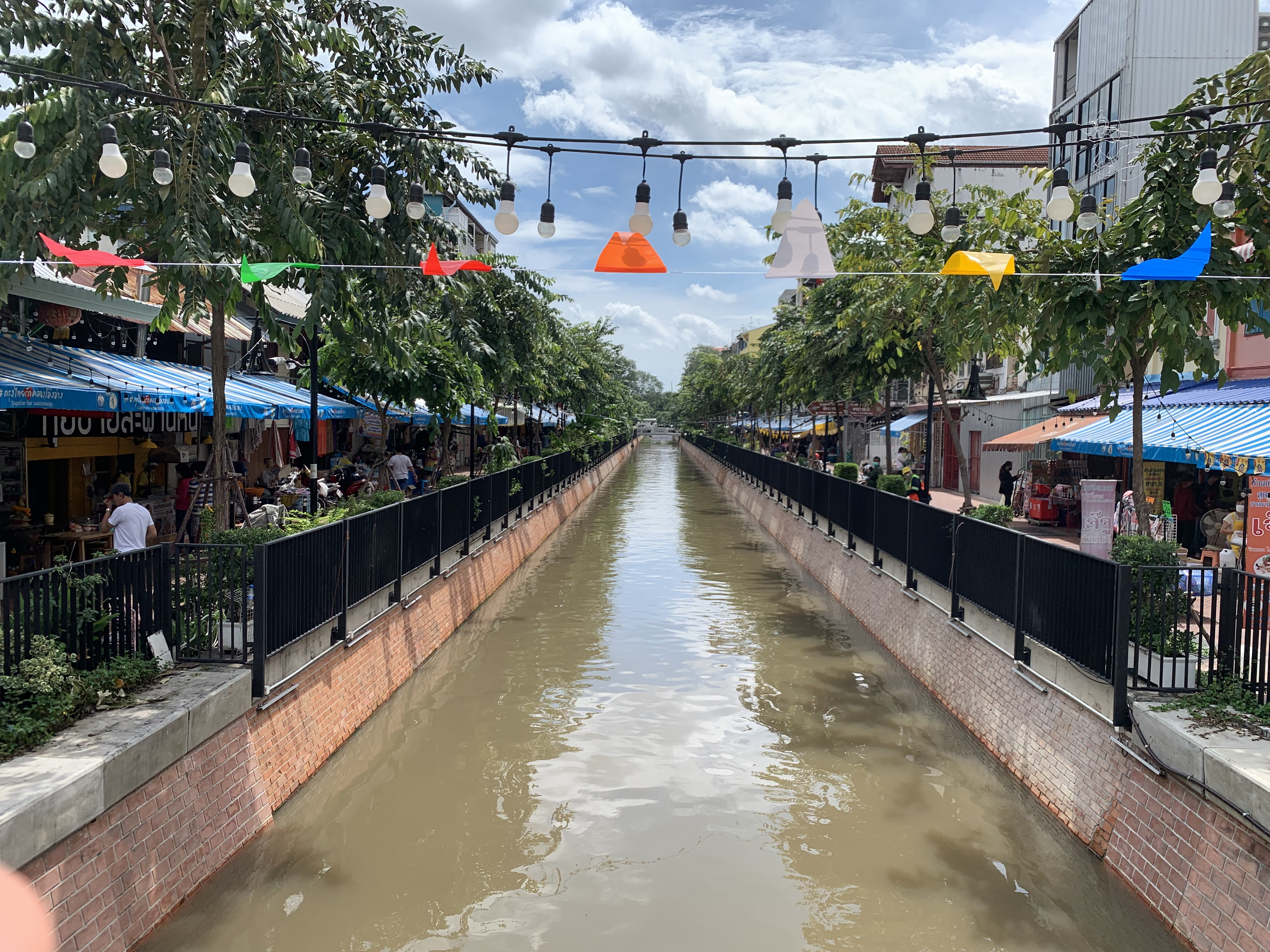
- Saphan Han Bridge crosses over Khlong Ong Ang
- Location: Rattanakosin Island, Bangkok
- Country: Thailand
- Coordinates: 13.745858°N 100.503702°E

Specifications
- Length: 1.826 km (1.135 miles)

History
- Date completed: 1783
- Date restored: 1983; 2015 Pedestrianized

Geography
- Direction: West
- Start point: Khlong Maha Nak and Khlong Bang Lamphu, near the Phan Fa Lilat Bridge
- End point: แม่นำ้เจ้าพระยา ,near the Phra Pok Klao Bridge
- Beginning coordinates: 13.755512°N 100.505998°E
- Ending coordinates: 13.739468°N 100.500135°E
- Branch of: Khlong Rop Krung
- Connects to: Chao Phraya River

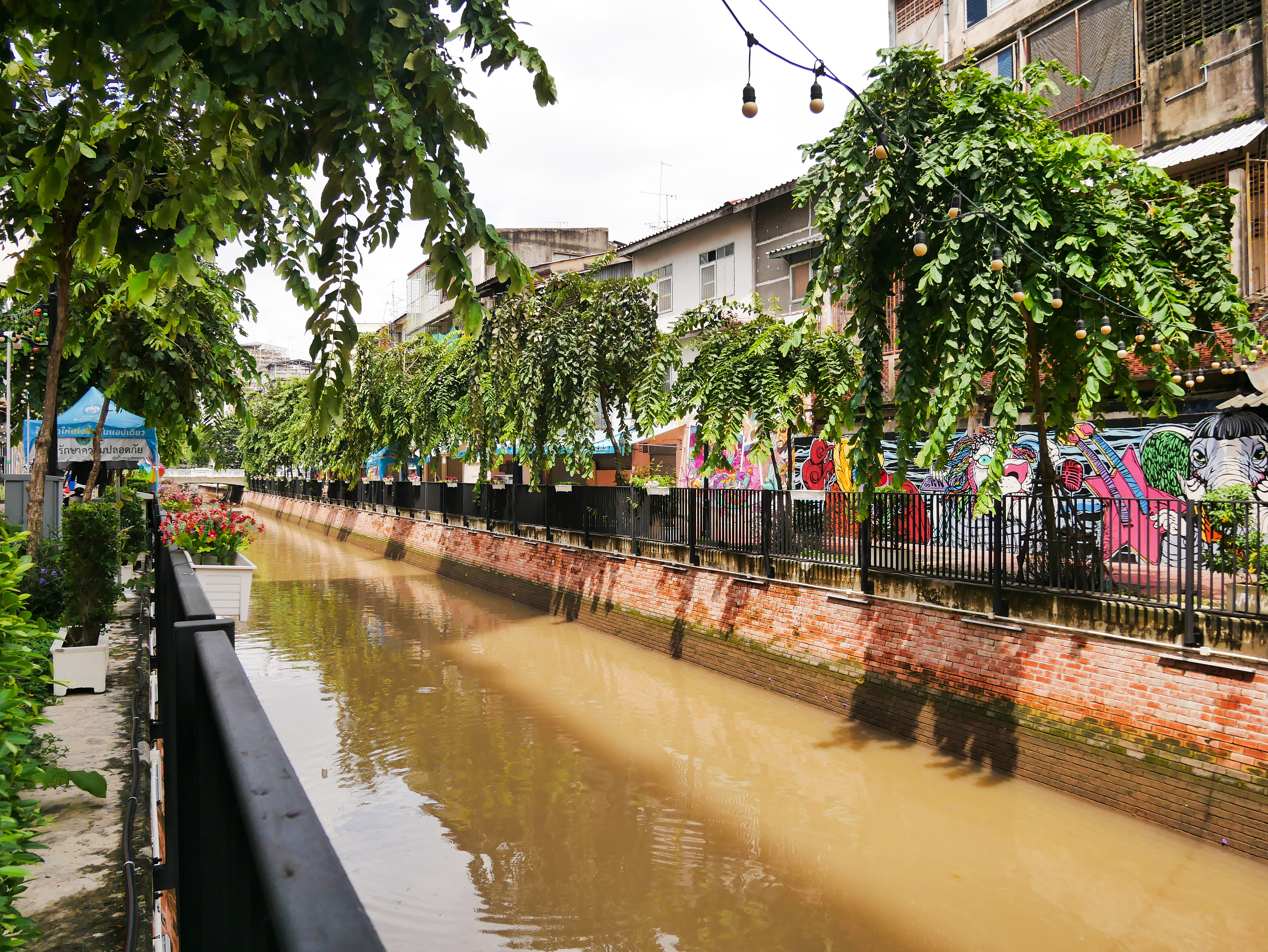
Khlong Ong Ang in 2022

Khlong Ong Ang (Thai: คลองโอ่งอ่าง, pronounced [kʰlɔ̄ːŋ ʔòːŋ ʔàːŋ]) is a canal (khlong) that forms part of the outer moat (Khlong Rop Krung) and marks the eastern edge of Rattanakosin Island in Bangkok. It is in fact the same waterway as Khlong Bang Lamphu, but the names differ depending on the section. The upper part, which flows through the Bang Lamphu area, is known as Khlong Bang Lamphu, while the lower section is referred to as Khlong Ong Ang. Both sections eventually empty into the Chao Phraya river.

In 2020, the canal was restored by the Bangkok Metropolitan Administration (BMA) to feature a walking street and night market. The restoration won a 2020 United Nations Human Settlements Programme (UN-Habitat) Asian Townscape Award. The Khlong Ong Ang Walking Street runs along both sides of the canal, from Saphan Han Bridge to Damrong Sathit Bridge.

Its name means "the canal of jars and bowls" because the area was once a trading hub for jars and pottery, particularly among Mon and Chinese merchants.
