= Chinatown, Bangkok =

Neighborhood in Bangkok, Thailand

Coordinates: 13.74°N 100.51°E

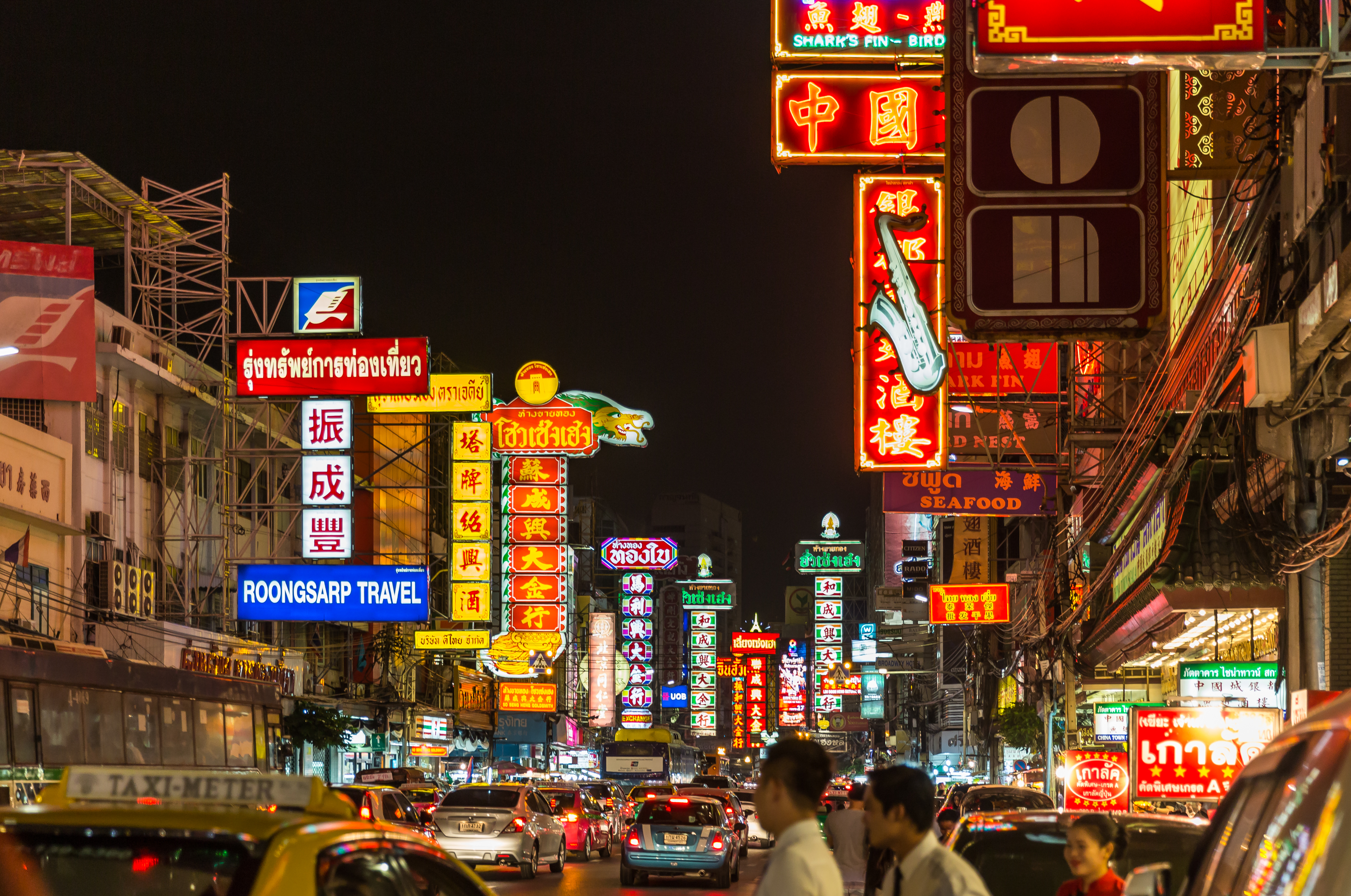
Yaowarat Road is the main artery of Chinatown.

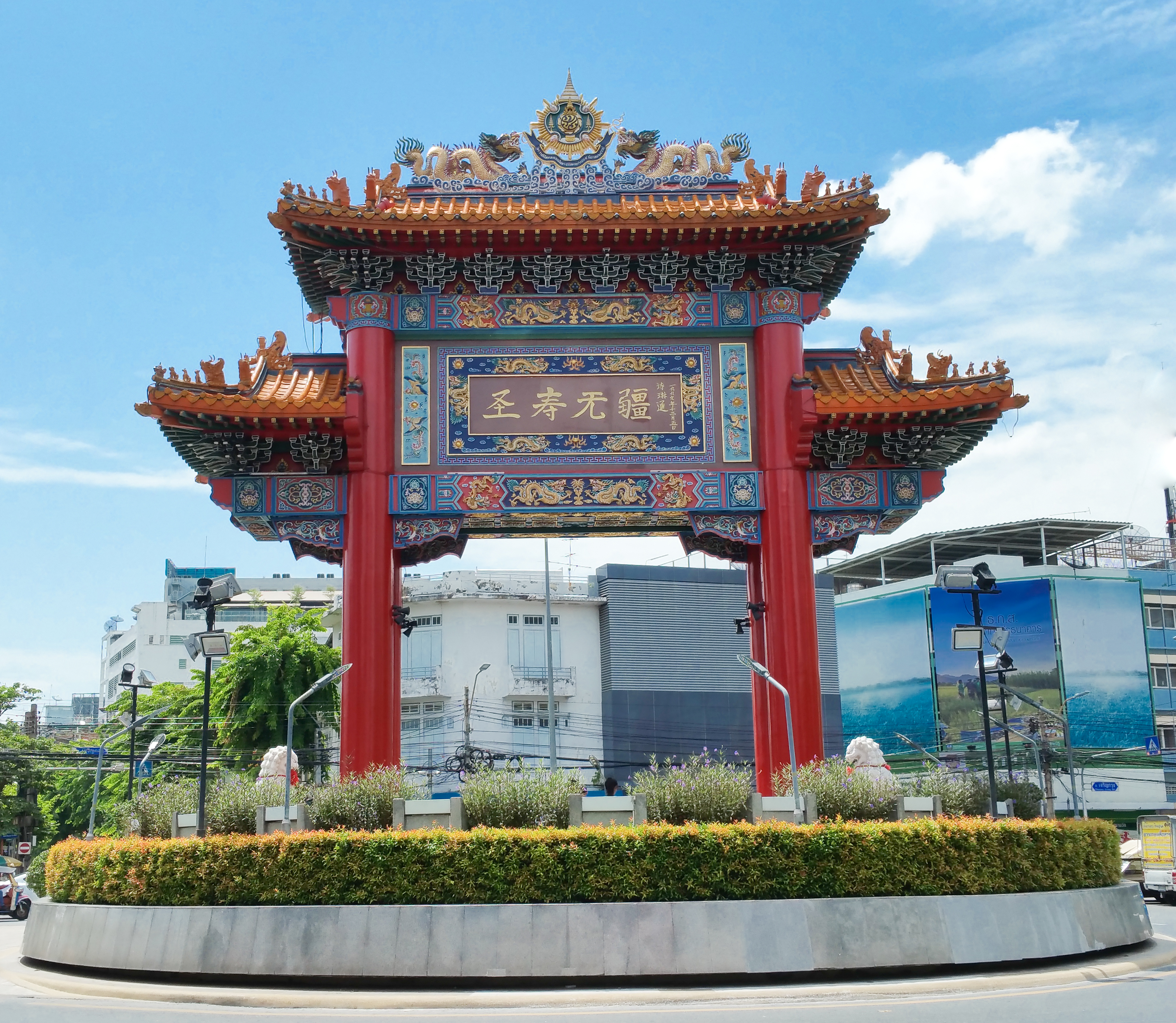
Chinatown Gate, Bangkok

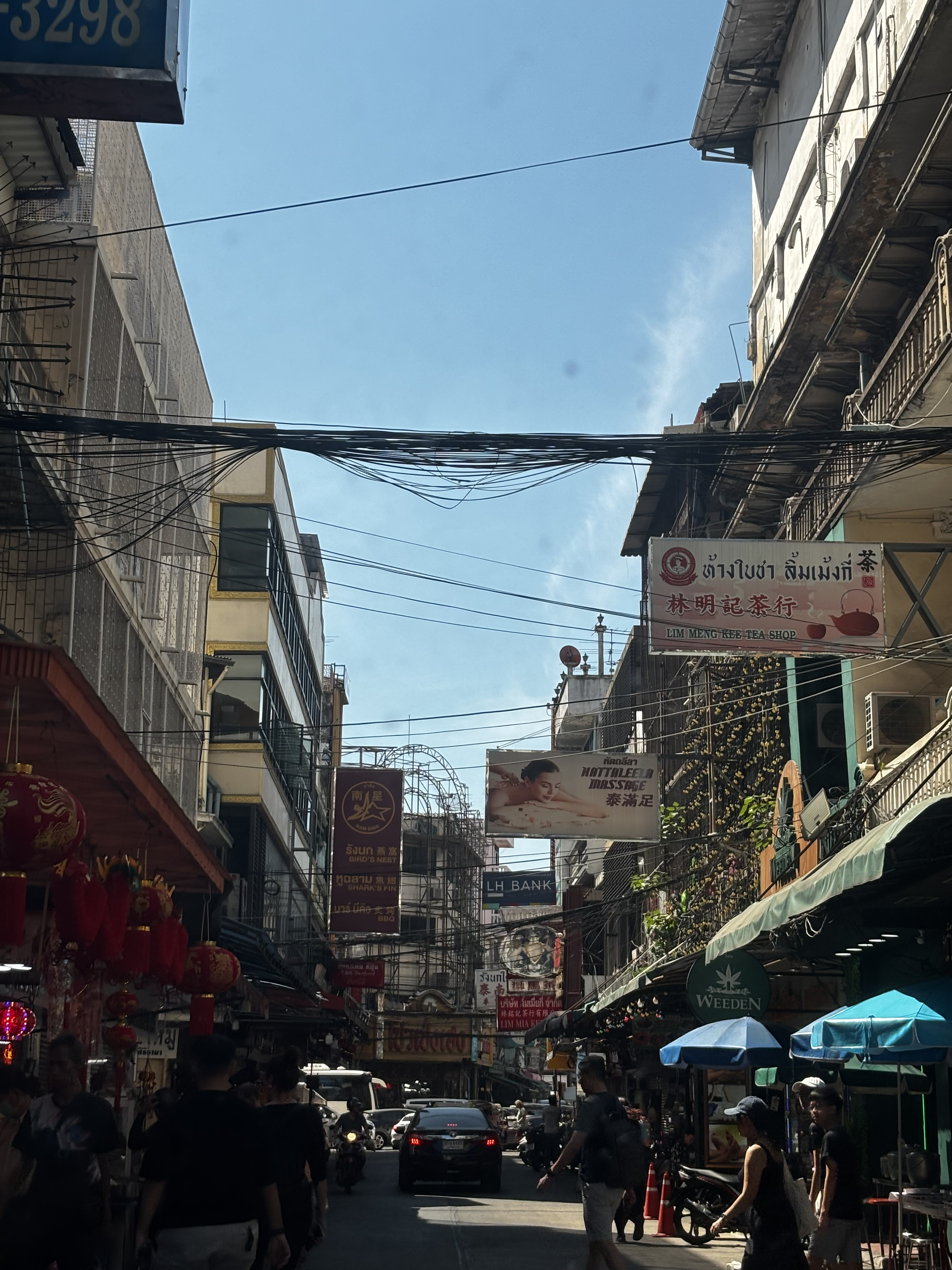
Trok Texas, one of the alleys in Chinatown.

Bangkok's Chinatown is one of the largest Chinatowns in the world. It was founded in 1782 when the city was established as the capital of the Rattanakosin Kingdom, and served as the home of the mainly Teochew immigrant Chinese population, who soon became the city's dominant ethnic group. Originally centred around Sampheng, the core of Chinatown now lies along Yaowarat Road, which serves as its main artery and sometimes lends its name to the entire area, which is often referred to as Yaowarat (Thai: เยาวราช). Chinatown's entire area roughly coincides with Samphanthawong District, and includes neighbourhoods such as Song Wat and Talat Noi along the Chao Phraya River, and Charoen Chai, Khlong Thom and Woeng Nakhon Khasem along Charoen Krung Road.

Originally a wilderness area outside the city walls, Chinatown grew to become Bangkok's commercial hub throughout the late 19th to early 20th centuries, but has since declined in prominence as commercial activity moved elsewhere following the city's expansion. It now serves as a hub of Chinese culture, with numerous shops selling traditional goods, and is especially known as a culinary destination.

== History ==
When King Taksin established the Thonburi Kingdom following the fall of Ayutthaya in 1767, he enlisted the aid of Teochew merchants, with whom he shared ethnic ties, in supplying his new capital at Thonburi with rice and provisions. In return, he granted them many favours, including land on the east bank of the Chao Phraya River, opposite his palace and enclosed by city walls, on which to settle their community. The Teochew prospered under Taksin, at the expense of the previously influential Hokkien, whose community was located in the area of Kudi Chin on the west bank south of the city.

Taksin's reign ended in 1782 when the general Chao Phraya Chakri instigated a coup against him and established the Rattanakosin Kingdom, becoming King Rama I. He had the palace moved to the east bank of the river, which was more strategically secure. This necessitated the relocation of the Teochew community—a move probably motivated by the fact that the Teochew had been supporters of the Taksin, while Rama I had ties to the Hokkien. Rama I had the Teochew resettle in the area of Sampheng, on the river's east bank southeast and downstream from the city centre. The area, between Wat Sam Pluem (now Wat Chakkrawat) and Wat Sampheng (now Wat Pathum Khongkha), was then a swampy, inaccessible area. A small road, later to become Sampheng Lane, linked it to the fortified city.

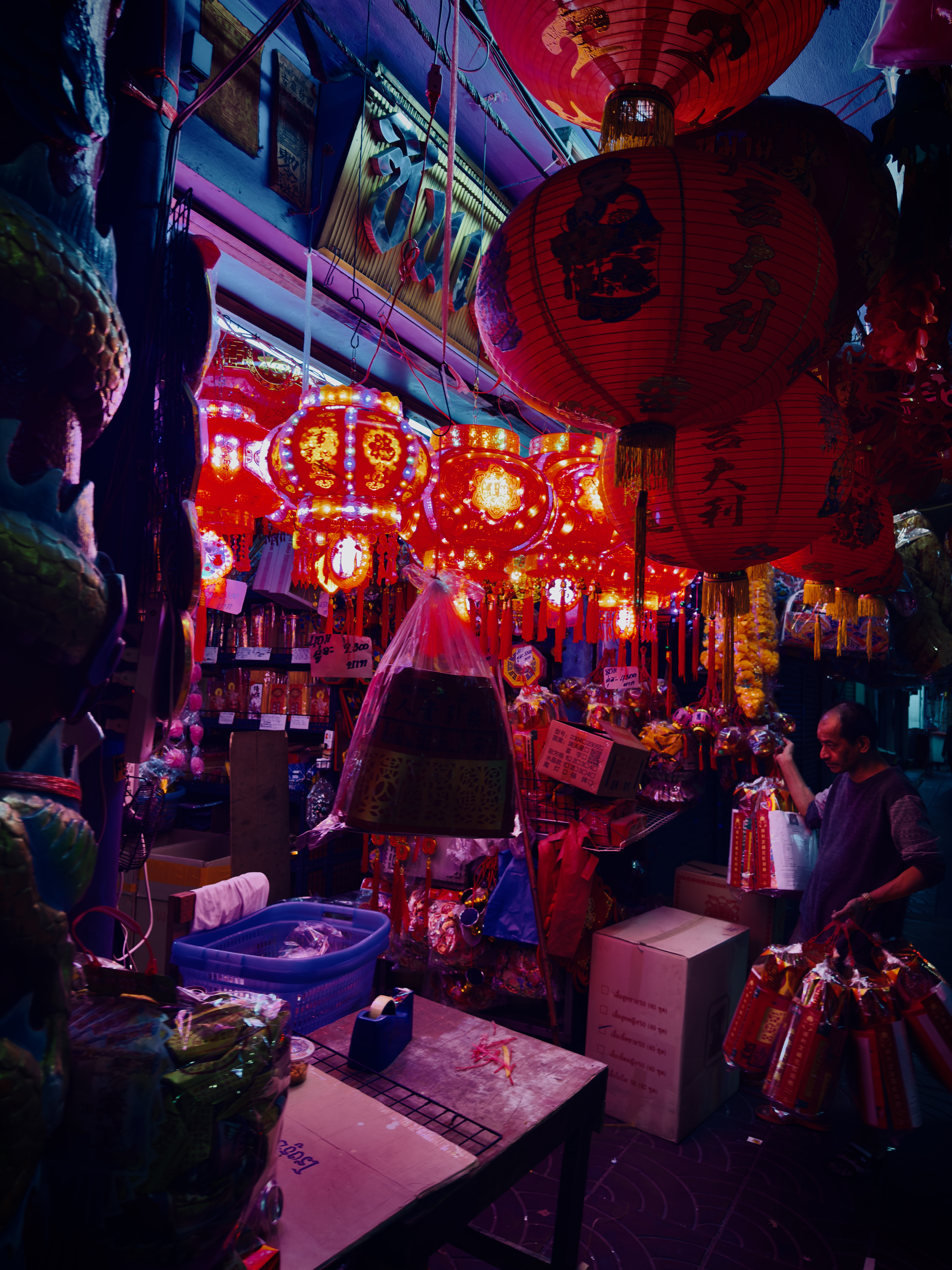
A Chinatown merchant, leading up to the Chinese New Year

As adept merchants, the Chinese community prospered in trade, and gradually grew as immigrants from China (including non-Teochew minorities) increasingly flooded into Bangkok. Chinatown underwent rapid growth following the signing of the Bowring Treaty, which liberalised international trade, in 1855. Import–export businesses flourished and numerous piers and warehouses arose in the area, their operations further facilitated by the construction of Charoen Krung Road in 1864. Chinatown, now a highly dense shantytown, was ravaged by numerous fires during the second half of the 19th century, which cleared the way for the construction of many new roads, including Yaowarat, during the reign of King Chulalongkorn (Rama V). By the turn of the 19th–20th centuries, Chinatown had become Bangkok's main commercial area, as well as a red-light district hosting opium dens, theatres, nightclubs and gambling houses.

In the 20th century, Chinatown's commercial prominence gradually declined as businesses and well-off residents moved to newer areas of the expanding city. Those remaining, however, have continued to practice their culture, making Chinatown a centre of Chinese food, crafts and religion, despite the general Chinese population's gradual assimilation into Thai society.

The direction of Chinatown's future again came into question the 2010s, with the construction of the Blue Line of the underground MRT, whose Wat Mangkorn station now serves the area. There have been calls for urban conservation, among concerns that old communities are being displaced by development.

== Areas ==
Samphanthawong District, containing most of the Chinatown area

- Yaowarat: Yaowarat Road is Chinatown's main artery. It runs from Odeon Circle, where it splits of Charoen Krung Road, to the old city moat of Khlong Ong Ang.
- Odeon Circle: A former traffic circle at the beginning of Yaowarat Road, it is the site of the Chinatown Gate, built in 1999.
- Sampheng: Now known as Soi Wanit 1, Sampheng Lane was the original street serving Chinatown. Today it is a busy market consisting of numerous shophouses lining a narrow pedestrian alley.
- Charoen Chai: A historic community located in Soi Charoen Krung 23, it is Thailand's largest and oldest marketplace for Chinese joss paper, god-honoring items, Moon Festival offering items, and the last source of traditional Chinese wedding items. The community name comes from its location between Charoen Krung and Phlapphla Chai Roads.
- Talat Noi: A fringe neighbourhood southeast of Yaowarat, it is home to several historic buildings.
- Song Wat: The street runs alongside the Chao Phraya River, and used to be the site of numerous cargo piers.
