= Wat Kanmatuyaram =

Buddhist temple in Bangkok, Thailand

Coordinates: 13°44′33″N 100°30′30″E

- วัดกันมาตุยาราม
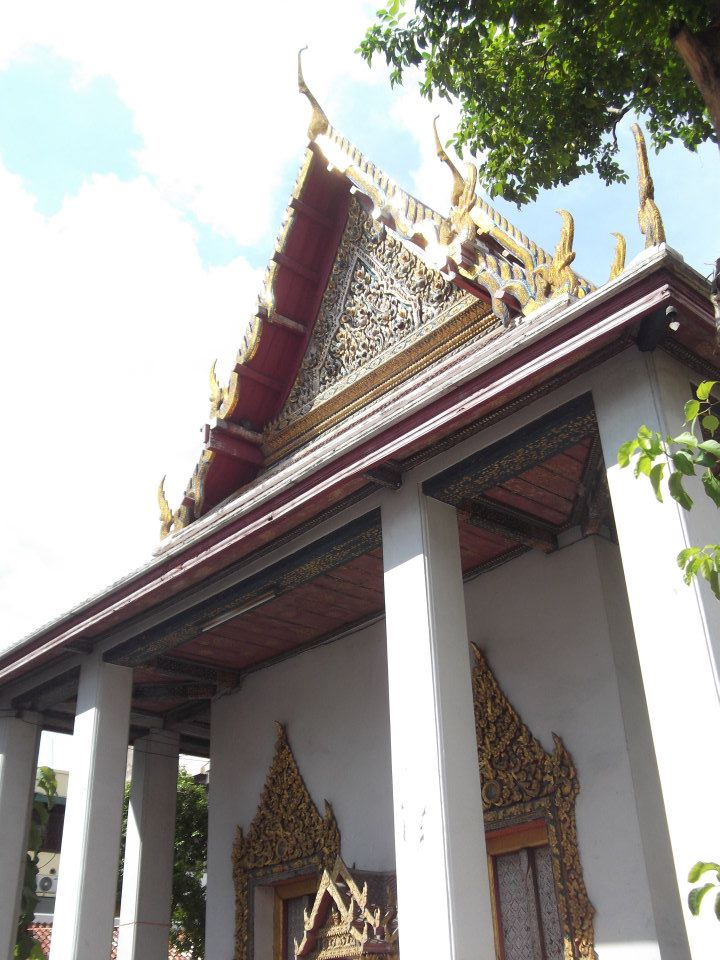
- Ordination hall

- Location within Thailand

Religion
- Affiliation: Buddhism
- Sect: Theravāda, Dhammayuttika

Location
- Location: 800 Mangkon Rd, Samphanthawong, Samphanthawong, Bangkok, Thailand
- Country: Thailand
- Interactive map of Wat Kanmatuyaram

Architecture
- Founder: Mrs. Kleap Sakhonwasi
- Completed: 1864

Wat Kanmatuyaram, or written as Wat Kanma Tuyaram (Thai: วัดกันมาตุยาราม) is a small Thai civilian temple in Bangkok, located on Mangkon Road, Samphanthawong Sub-district, Samphanthawong District, regarded as another Thai temple located in the area of Bangkok's Chinatown, in addition to Wat Traimit. The entrance of the temple on Charoen Krung Road located diagonally from Chinese temple Wat Mangkon Kamalawat. The temple belongs to Dhammayuttika Nikaya of Theravada Buddhism.

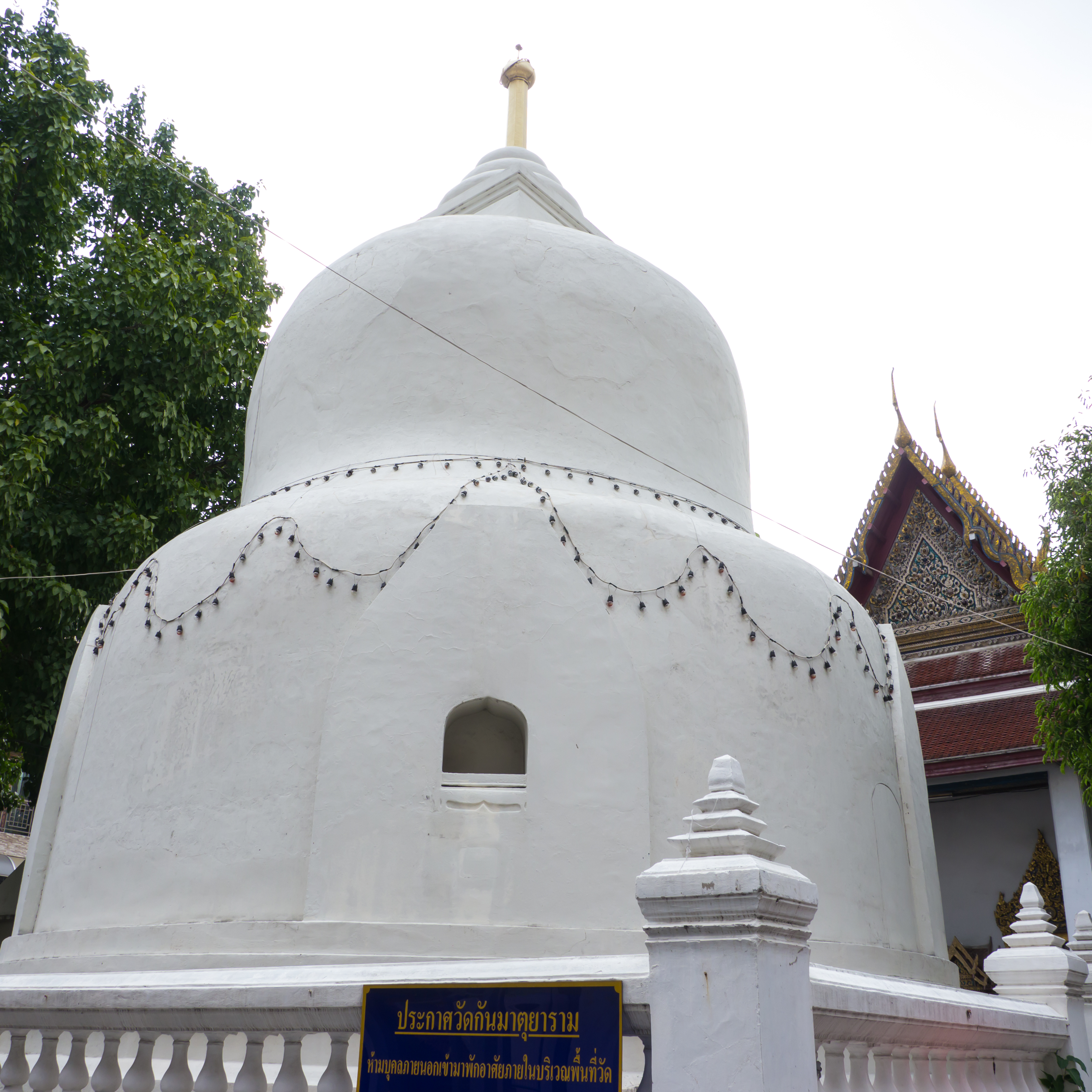
replica of Dhamek Stupa in Lanka style

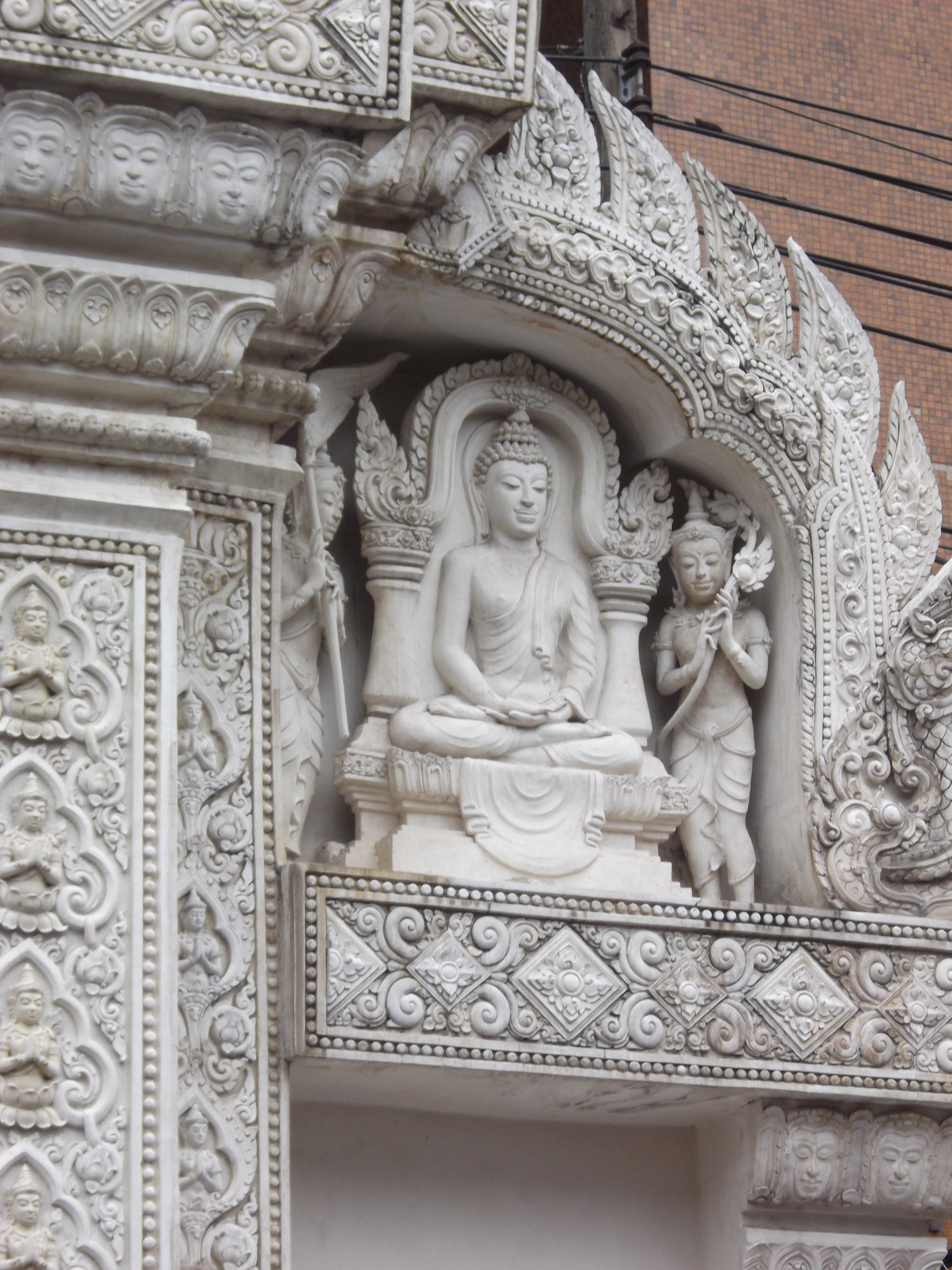
Stucco of Buddha and deities on the temple gate

The temple dating back to the King Mongkut (Rama IV)'s reign. When Mrs. Kleap Sakhonwasi dedicated her flower garden, to be built as a Buddhist temple. She was the daughter of Yai Fang, the proprietor of the renowned sporting house in Sampheng area, who devote own land to create a temple Wat Khanikaphon (now located on nearby Phlapphla Chai Road).

The temple was completed in 1864. When it completed, her son Mr. Kan Sakhonwasi became a royal page of King Mongkut and the king named it "Wat Kanmatuyaram", which means "temple of Mr. Kan’s mother".

Highlights of this temple include the replica of Dhamek Stupa in Lanka architectural style. In Thailand there are only two stupas of this kind, besides here is Wat Sommanat Wihan in Nang Loeng area. The temple gate stucco sculpted of floral and deities patterns.

Shrine of Chinese Goddess Guanyin located next to the outer temple wall.
