= 22 July Circle =

Traffic circle in Thailand

Coordinates: 13°44′31″N 100°30′48″E

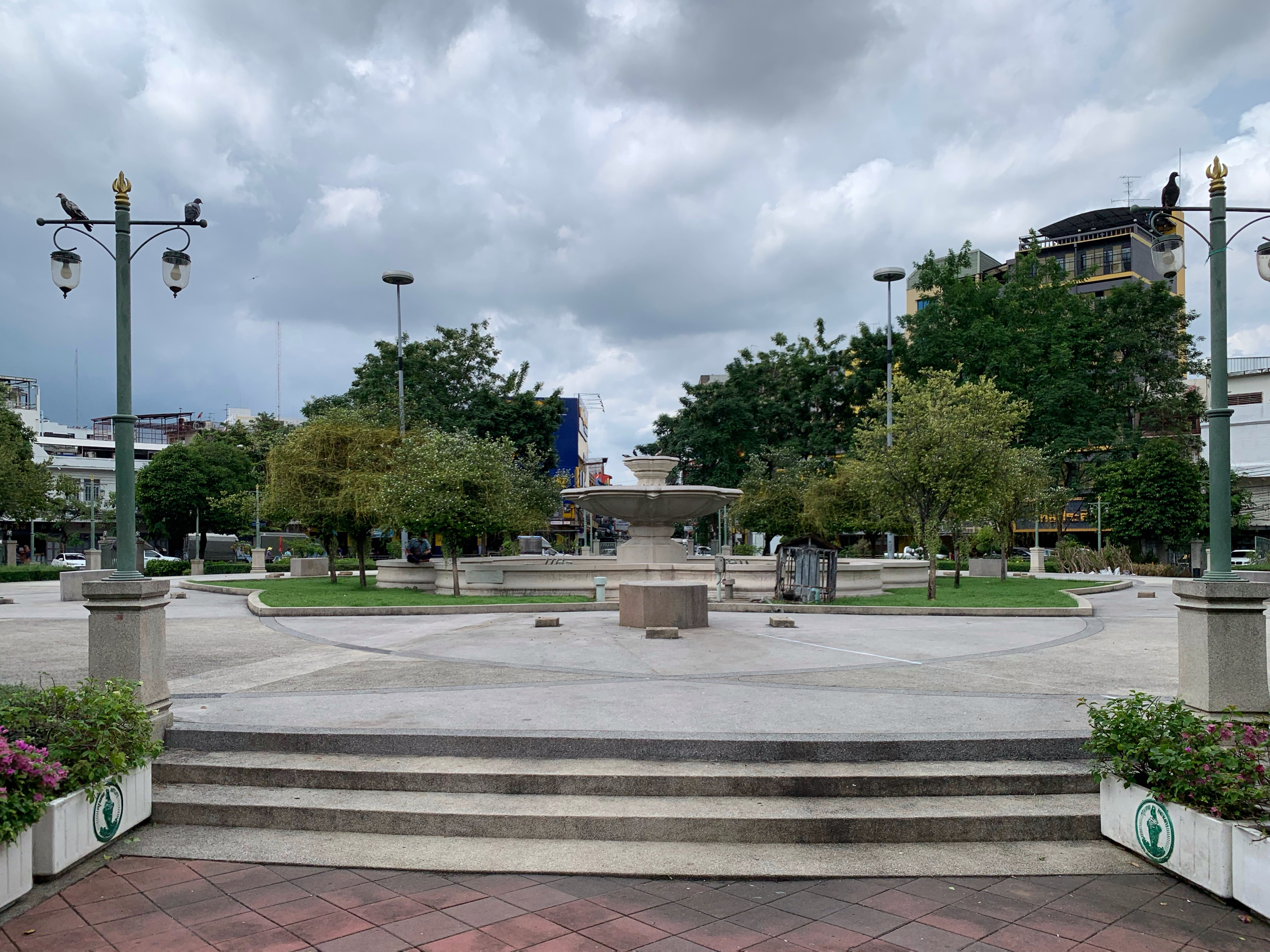
22 July Circle in 2021

The 22 July Circle (Thai: วงเวียน 22 กรกฎาคม, RTGS: Wongwian Yi Sip Song Karakadakhom) is a traffic circle in Thailand. It's an intersection of Maitri Chit, Santiphap and Mittraphan roads in Pom Prap subdistrict, Pom Prap Sattru Phai district, Bangkok.

== History ==
22 July Circle was built on 24 January 1918 to commemorate the occasion of Thailand's participation in World War I, which was the royal intention of King Vajiravudh (Rama VI), the king of Thailand at the time. Under his directives, the Ministry of Public Works of Siam constructed many roads in that area. King Vajiravudh also gave names to other roads nearby, such as Suea Pa or Phlapphla Chai roads. In the following reign of his brother, King Prajadhipok, the three roads branching from the 22 July Circle were intentionally named to stress Siam's participation in WWI on the side of the Allied powers: "Maitri Chit" means friendship, "Mittraphan" was intended to signified the Allied powers, and "Santiphap" means peace.

The name "22 July" comes from the date Thailand declared war, which corresponds to 22 July 1917.

== Characteristics ==
At the center of the roundabout is a fountain with a small public park for people to rest. The surrounding area is home to many billboard or advertising board shophouses, including tire and car spare parts shops and many famous restaurants. It has also been known for years as another district of Bangkok's sex industry.

22 July Circle is considered one of the circuits in Bangkok's Chinatown like another roundabout, Odeon Circle on Yaowarat road. It is close to many important places such as Bangkok railway station (Hua Lamphong), Wat Phlapphla Chai, Wat Thepsirin, the Maitrichit Chinese Baptist Church, the first Protestant church in Thailand, and Wat Khanikaphon, including Poh Teck Tung Foundation's headquarters.

In addition, it was also a popular place to observe the total solar eclipse on 22 July 2009.
