= Pom Prap =

Administrative sub-district in Bangkok

Coordinates: 13°44′37.8″N 100°30′39.1″E

Pom Prap ป้อมปราบ
- Khwaeng
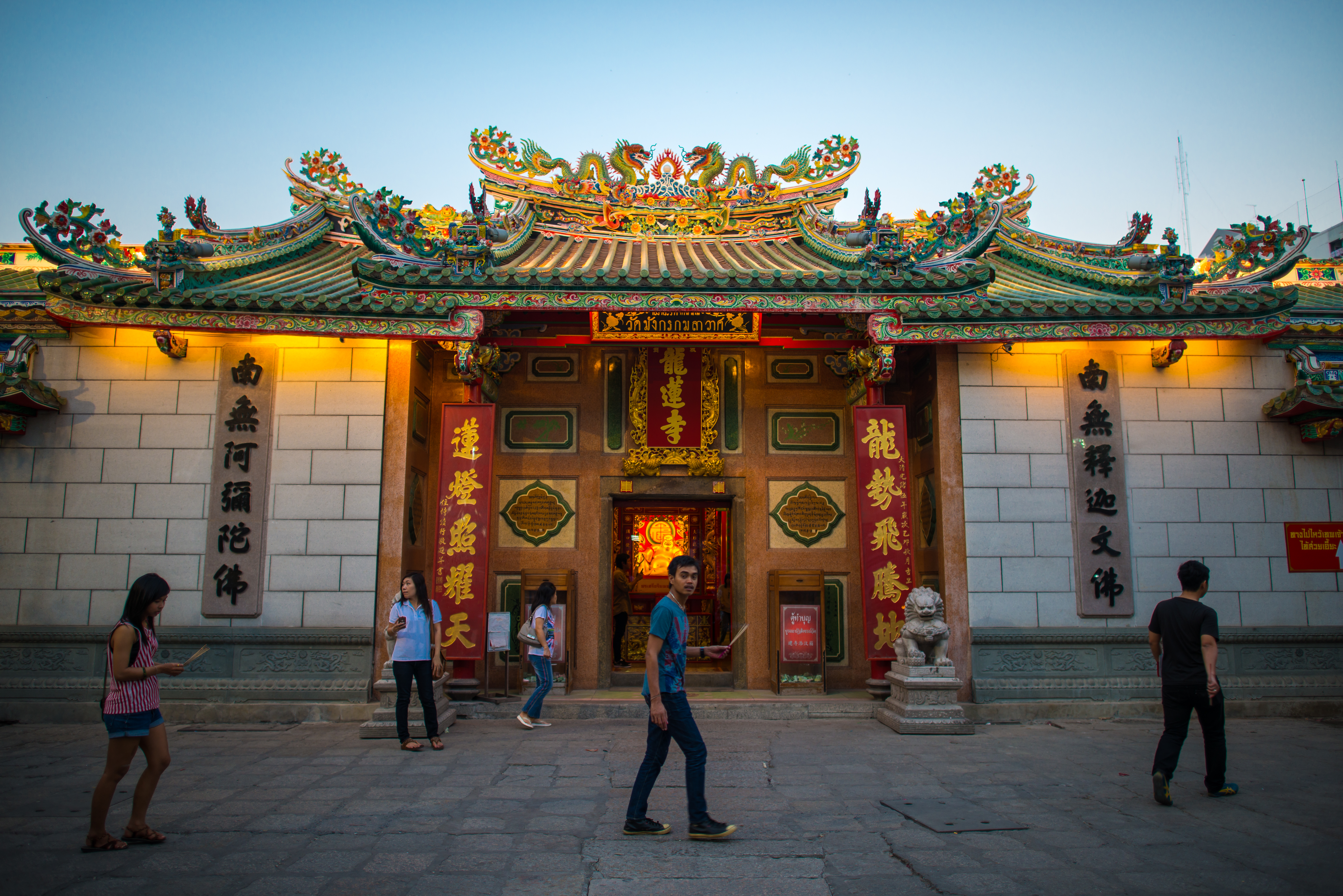
- Wat Mangkon Kamalawat, also known as Leng Noei Yi (龍蓮寺) according to Teochew dialect

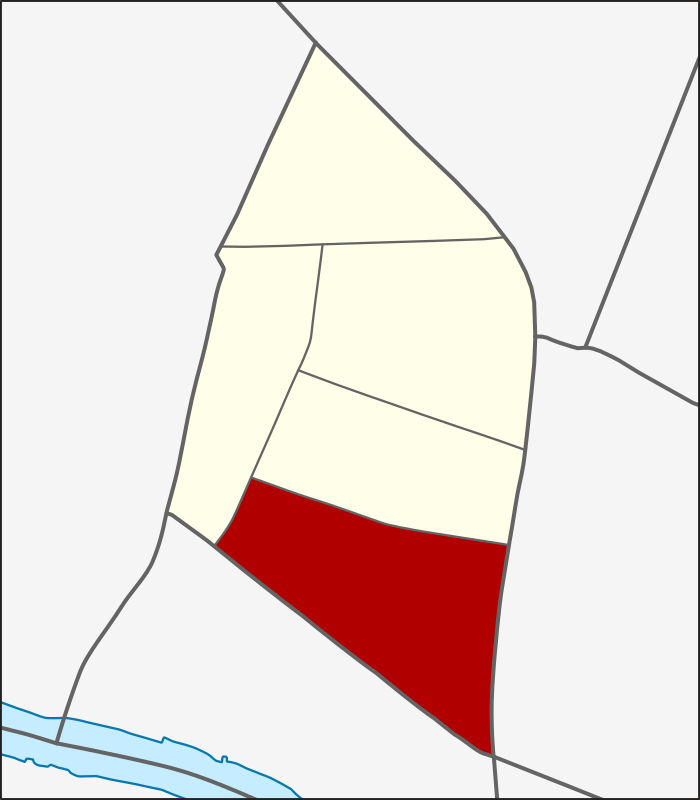
- Location in Pom Prap Sattru Phai district
- Country: Thailand
- Province: Bangkok
- Khet: Pom Prap Sattru Phai

Area
  - Total: 0.535 km^{2} (0.207 sq mi)

Population (2019)
  - Total: 14,581
- Time zone: UTC+7 (ICT)
- Postal code: 10100
- TIS 1099: 100801

Pom Prap (Thai: ป้อมปราบ, pronounced [pɔ̂m pràːp]) is one of five khwaengs (subdistricts) of Pom Prap Sattru Phai district, Bangkok. In February 2019 it had a total population of 15,440 people (7,444 men, 7,956 women). The majority of the population consists of Thais and Thai Chinese.

== History ==
Its name after a fort was called "Pom Prap Sattru Phai", southward of Nang Leong Ban Yuan (near Nopphawong Bridge in present day). It was one of the eight forts built along two banks of Khlong Phadung Krung Kasem according to the King Mongkut (Rama IV)'s orders. When Bangkok was expanding, the government therefore removed these forts.

== Geography ==
Neighbouring subdistricts are (from the north clockwise): Wat Thep Sirin in its district, Rong Mueang of Pathum Wan District, Maha Phruettharam of Bang Rak District, Talat Noi and Samphanthawong of Samphanthawong District, and Ban Bat in its district.

== Places ==
=== Important places ===
- Wat Mangkon Kamalawat (Wat Leng Noei Yi)
- Kwang Tung Shrine (Kwong Siew Commerce Association of Thailand)
- Poh Teck Tung Foundation and Tai Hong Kong Shrine
- Wat Khanikaphon
- Lee Ti Miew Shrine
- Plubplachai 1 Police Station and Plubplachai 2 Police Station
- Wat Phlapphla Chai
- Maitrichit Chinese Baptist Church
- Bangkok Metropolitan Administration General Hospital (Klang Hospital)
- Khlong Thom Market and Sua Pa Plaza
- Saipanya School Under the Royal Patronage of her Majesty the Queen
- Kia Hua Tong Nguan (Sirinakorn) Chinese Newspaper Headquarters

=== Transport ===
Main roads

- Charoen Krung Road (New Road)
- Phlapphla Chai Road
- Worachak Road
- Rama IV Road

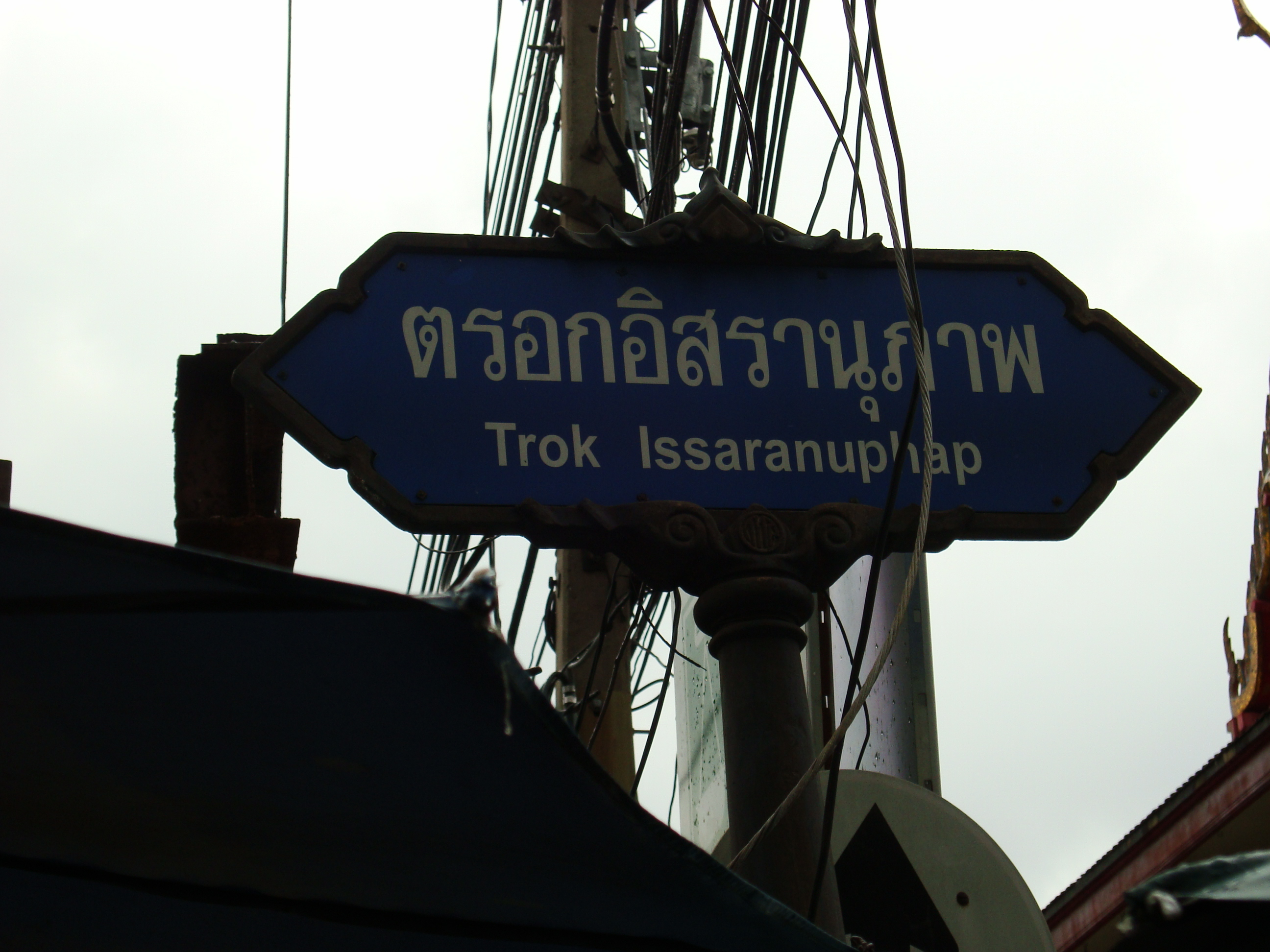
Sign of Issaranuphap Alley, also known as Trok Issaranuphap in Thai

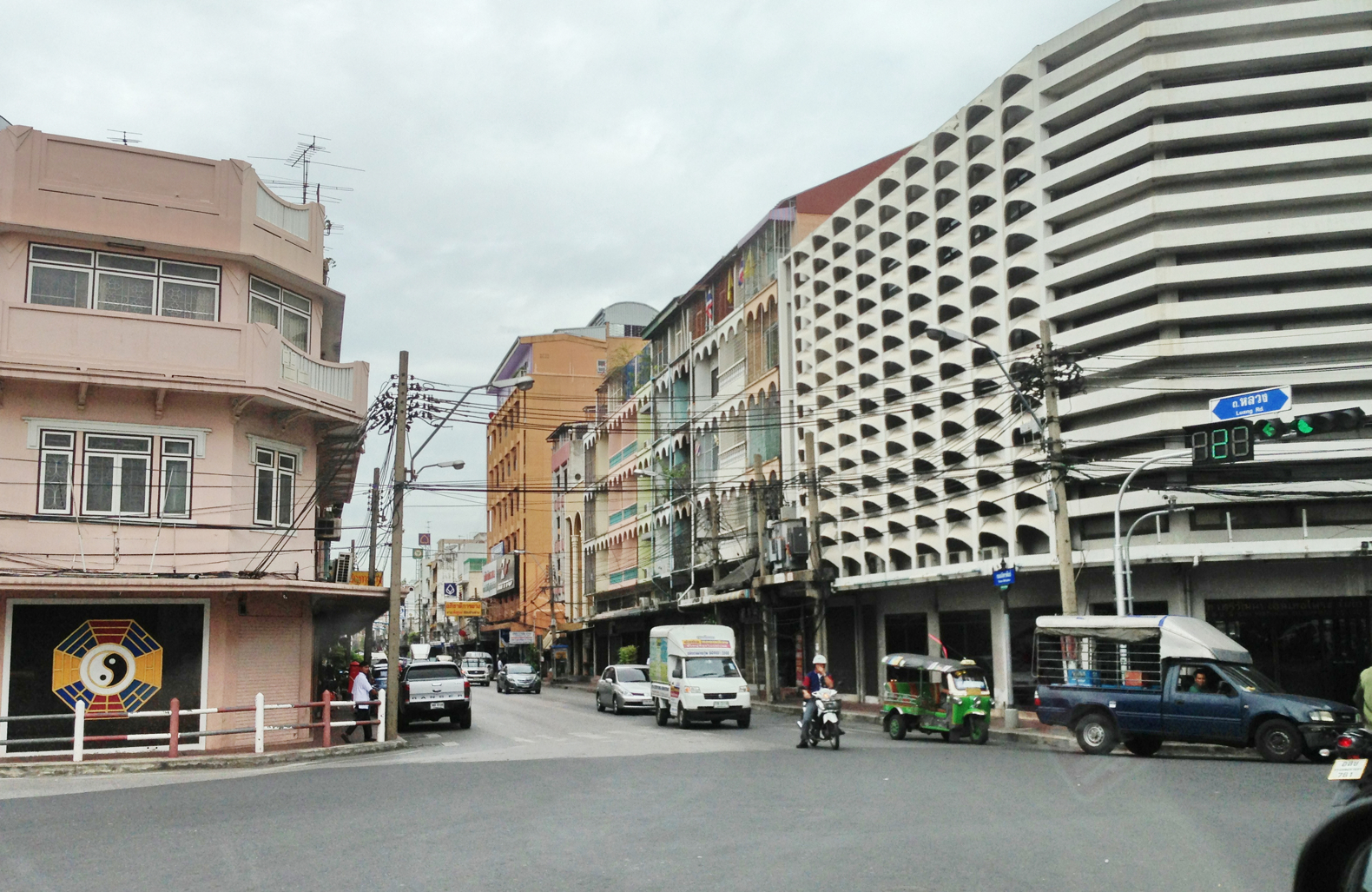
Nopphawong Square, five-way intersection of Krung Kasem, Luang, Mittraphan Roads, including Nopphawong Bridge

Minor roads

- Suea Pa Road
- Mangkon Road
- Paribatra Road
- Maitri Chit Road
- Santiphap Road
- Mittraphan Road
- Wongwian Yi Sip Song Karakadakhom Road
- Wang Chao Sai Road
- Krung Kasem Road
- Chao Khamrop Road
- Yommarat Sukhum Road
- Issaranuphap Lane

Intersections

- 22 July Circle
- Mo Mi Intersection
- Maitri Chit Square
- Nopphawong Square
