= Ratchawong Road =

Street in Bangkok, Thailand

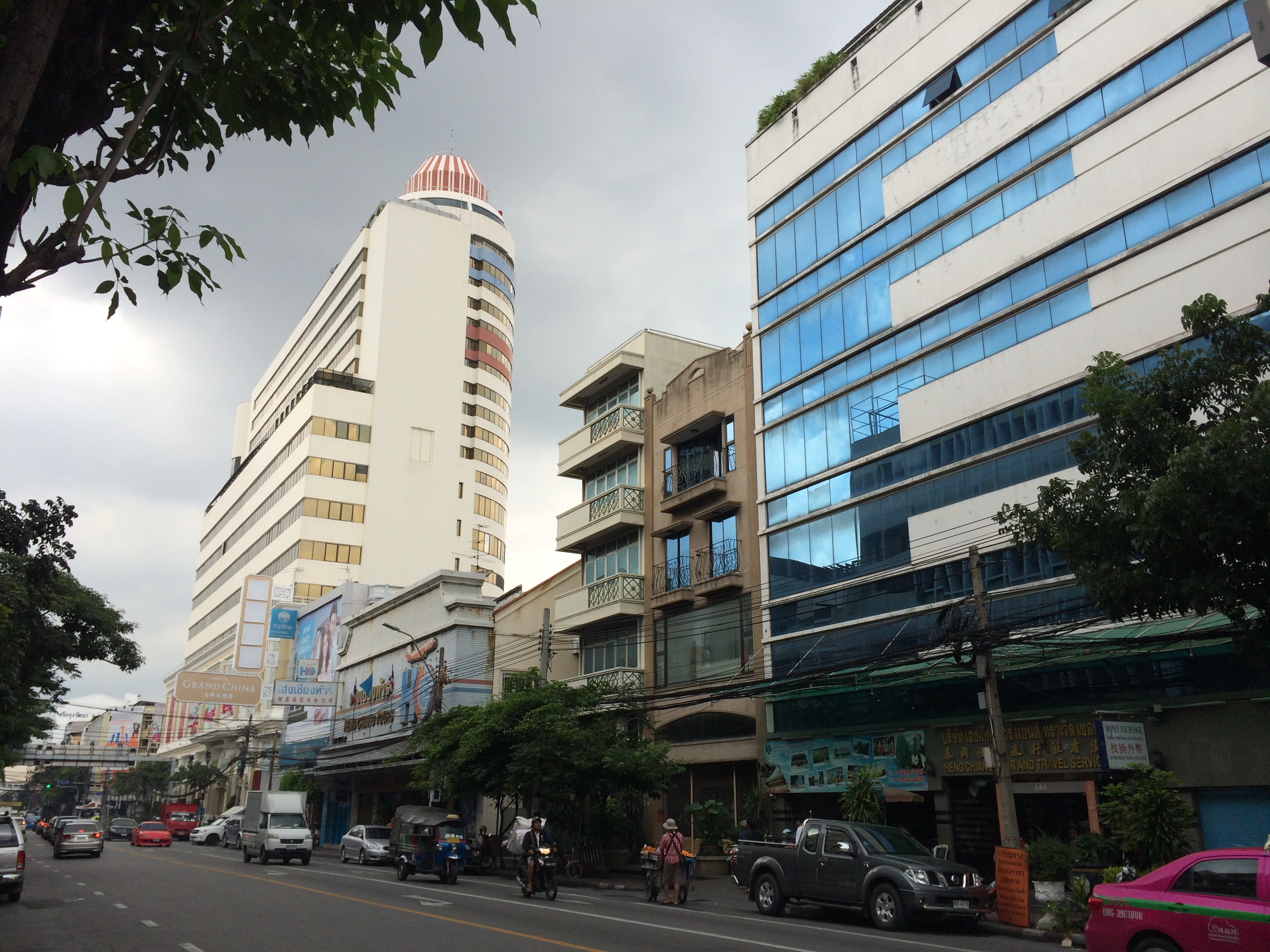
- Ratchawong Road between Suea Pa and Ratchawong Intersections, where the white Grand China Hotel stands on the corner
- Interactive map of Ratchawong Road
- Native name: ถนนราชวงศ์
- Length: 700 m (2,300 ft)
- Location: Samphanthawong, Bangkok, Thailand
- Coordinates: 13°44′43″N 100°30′23″E
- Northeast end: Suea Pa Intersection
- Southwest end: Ratchawong Pier

Ratchawong Road (Thai: ถนนราชวงศ์, RTGS: Thanon Ratchawong, pronounced [tʰā.nǒn râːt.tɕʰā.wōŋ], lit. 'dynasty road') is a road in Bangkok, Thailand. It is located in the area of Bangkok's Chinatown, or more locally known as Yaowarat.

== History ==
Ratchawong Road was constructed during the reign of King Chulalongkorn (Rama V). It connects to Charoen Krung Road (also known as New Road) at its junction with Suea Pa Road, and continues past Yaowarat Road at a point officially known as Ratchawong Intersection. From there, the road leads to Ratchawong Pier on the bank of the Chao Phraya River, with a total length of approximately 700 m (0.4 mi).

In the past, Ratchawong Pier served as a major port for both passenger and cargo ships traveling between Bangkok and other provinces. The buildings along Ratchawong Road were owned by foreign merchants, including Chinese, Indian, and European nationals, who ran wholesale businesses in the area. Near Yaowarat Road, the area was once home to shopping centers and restaurants, many of which were famous for dishes like boiled rice and ice cream. These venues were popular among members of the noble class who came to dine regularly. One of the restaurants was even used as a planning site by a group of naval officers involved in the 1932 revolution.

Today, some of the historic shops from that era can still be seen at the beginning of the road. In contrast, the end of the road near the pier is now occupied by companies and commercial banks. In 1944, just before the end of World War II, this area became the first location of Bangkok Bank, which was founded and operated by Chin Sophonpanich. It continues to operate today as the Bangkok Bank, Ratchawong Branch.

At that time, Ratchawong Road was considered the true commercial heart of Bangkok. Many major banks were located here, and the area's economic activity later expanded into nearby districts such as Suea Pa and Suan Mali, even reaching as far as Silom and Sathon, which were not yet the thriving business hubs they are today.

In addition, the end of the road serves as the terminal point for BMA bus line (2-52) 204, which runs from Mo Chit 2 to Ratchawong Pier.

In early 2016, Ratchawong Road was ranked the best pedestrian street in Bangkok by the Urban Design and Development Center (UddC), thanks to its shaded sidewalks, lively street stalls, and vibrant shophouses that line both sides of the street.
