= Rong Mueang =

Coordinates: 13°44′41.8″N 100°31′19.9″E

Rong Mueang รองเมือง
- Khwaeng
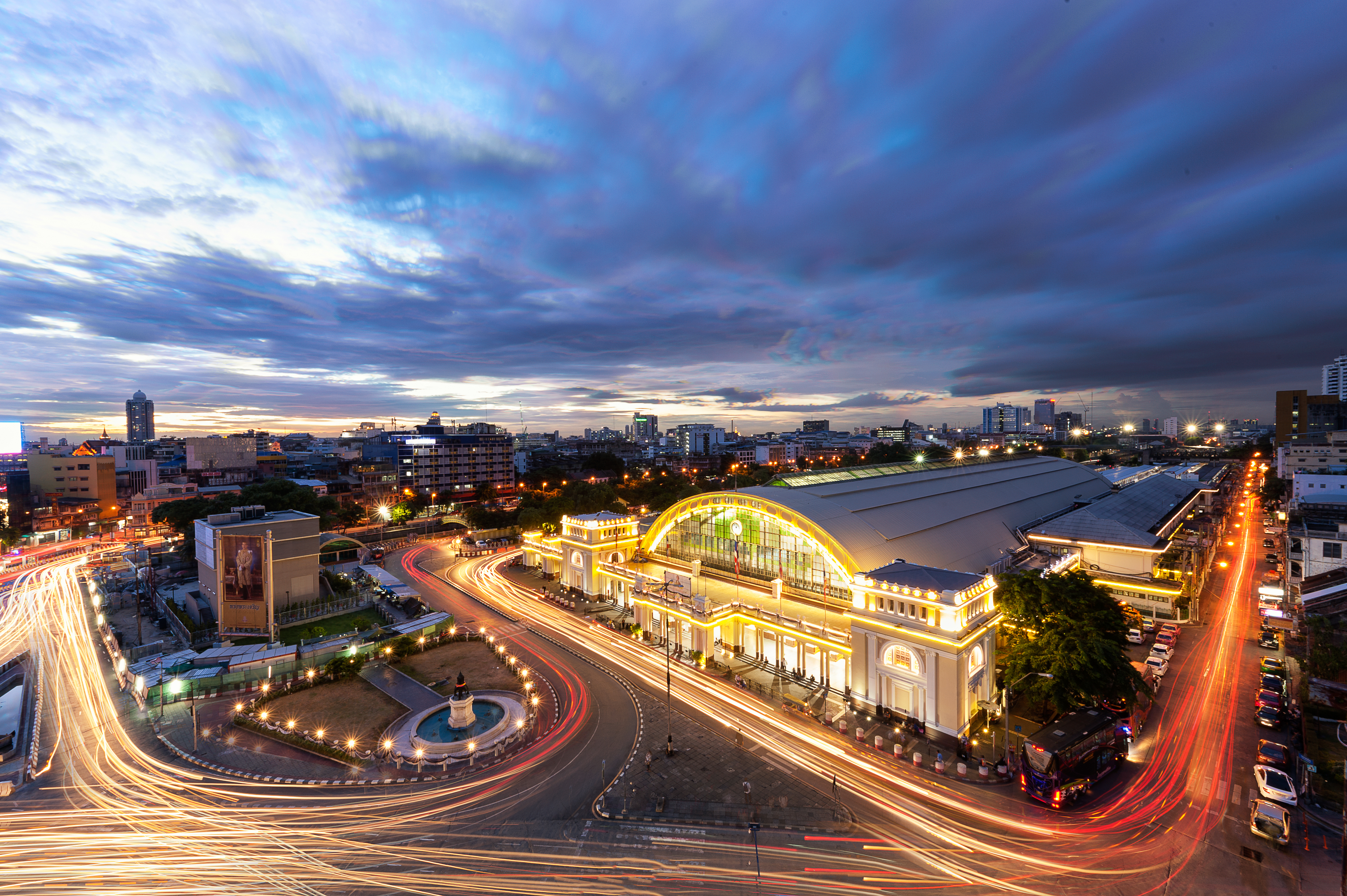
- Aerial view of Hua Lamphong railway station in evening, the road on the right and parallel to the station is Rong Mueang road.

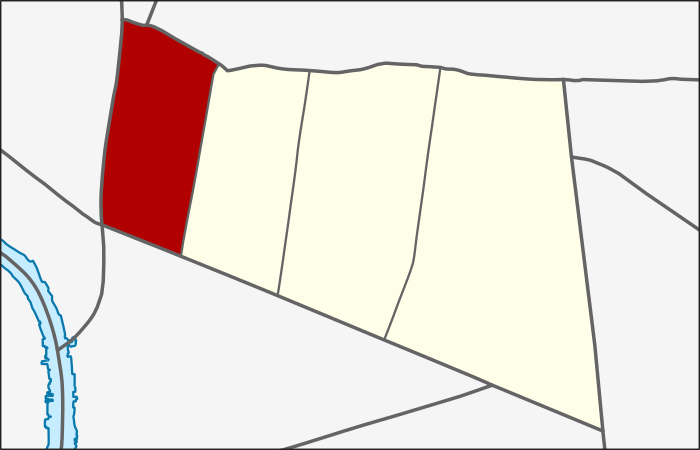
- Location in Pathum Wan district
- Country: Thailand
- Province: Bangkok
- Khet: Pathum Wan

Area
  - Total: 1.300 km^{2} (0.502 sq mi)

Population (2018)
  - Total: 17,181
  - Density: 13,205.99/km^{2} (34,203.4/sq mi)
- Time zone: UTC+7 (ICT)
- Postal code: 10330
- TIS 1099: 100701

Rong Mueang (Thai: รองเมือง, pronounced [rɔ̄ːŋ mɯ̄a̯ŋ]) is a khwaeng (subdistrict) of Pathum Wan district, downtown Bangkok.

== History ==
The district takes its name from Rong Mueang Road, a short route that runs through the area. The road runs parallel to the Bangkok railway station side to end at Rama I Road on the Kasat Suek ฺBridge, a distance of about 900 metres (2,952 ft).

This road was named in honour of Phraya Indra Dhibodee Siharat Rong Mueang (M.R. Lop Suthat), a nobleman during the King Rama V's reign. He was one of the nobles of those days who helped build many roads in Bang Rak District for real estate investment such as Si Phraya, Decho, and Surawong. Construction began in 1902 and continued until the opening ceremony on 29 March 1904.

== Geography ==
Rong Mueang has an area of approximately 1.423 km^{2} (0.549 mi^{2}). Neighbouring subdistricts are (from the north clockwise): Si Yaek Maha Nak in Dusit District, Thanon Phetchaburi in Ratchathewi District, Wang Mai in its district, Maha Phruettharam in Bang Rak District, Pom Prap, Wat Thep Sirin, and Khlong Maha Nak in Pom Prap Sattru Phai District.

The area is an amalgam of at least four communities: Trok Salak Hin, Wat Duang Khae, Flat Rot Fai, and Charat Mueang. Between them, they boast seven interesting landmarks.

Rong Mueang is home to many restaurants, some of them was chosen to be Bib Gourmand from Michelin Guide.

== Places ==
=== Important places ===
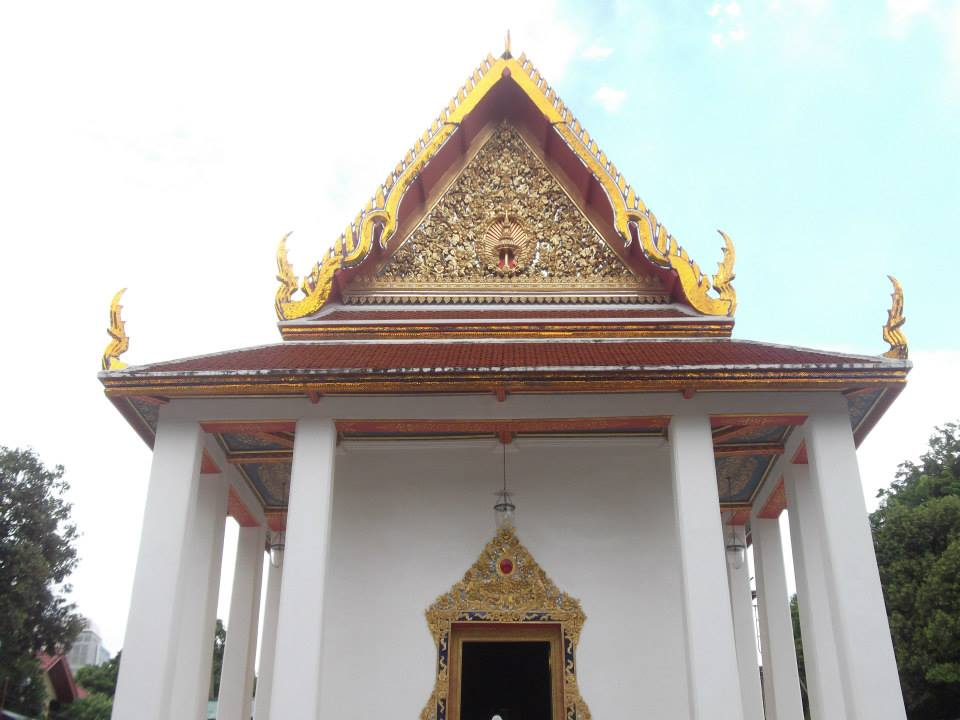
Main hall of Wat Boromniwat

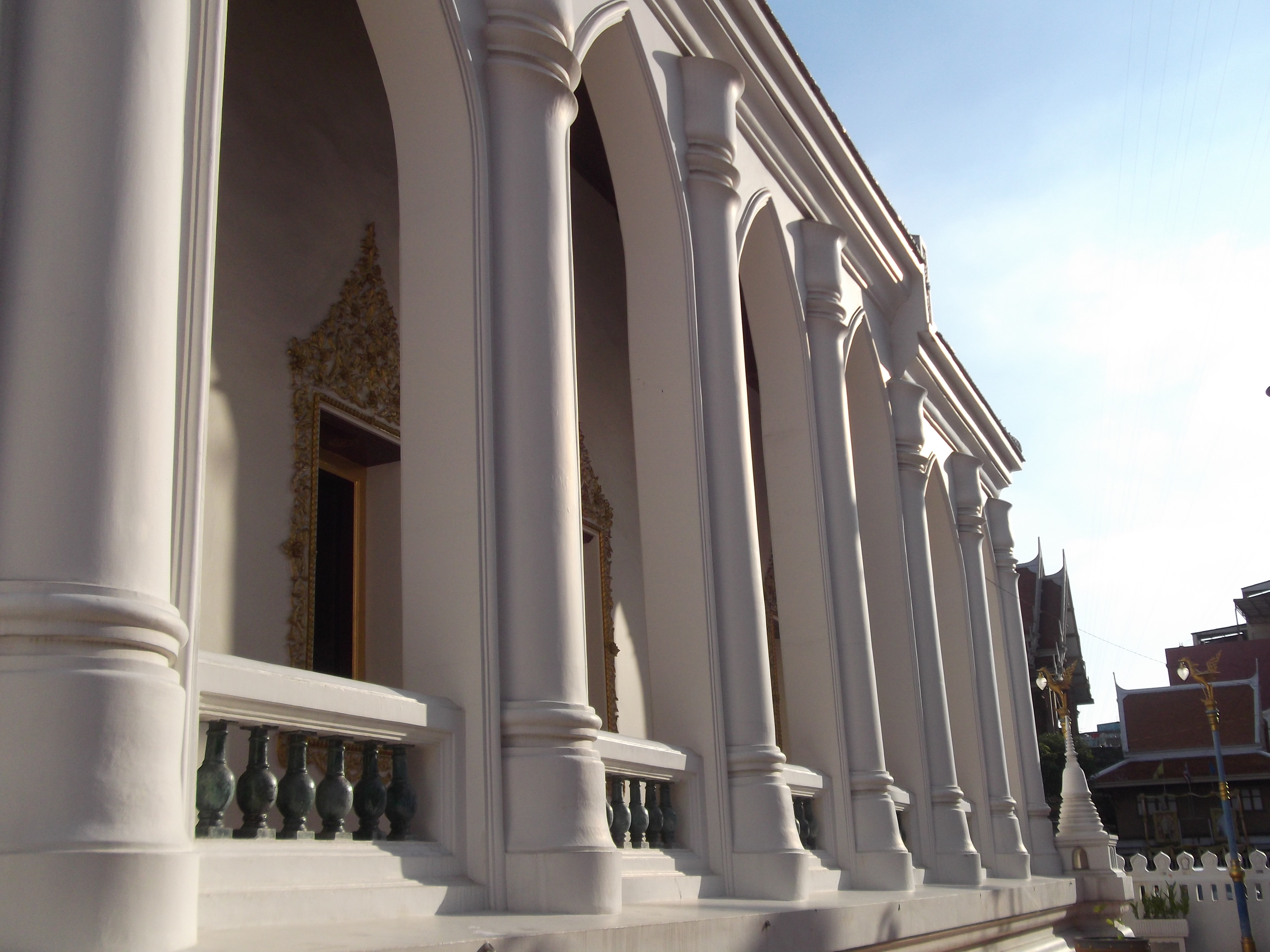
Wat Duang Khae's main hall

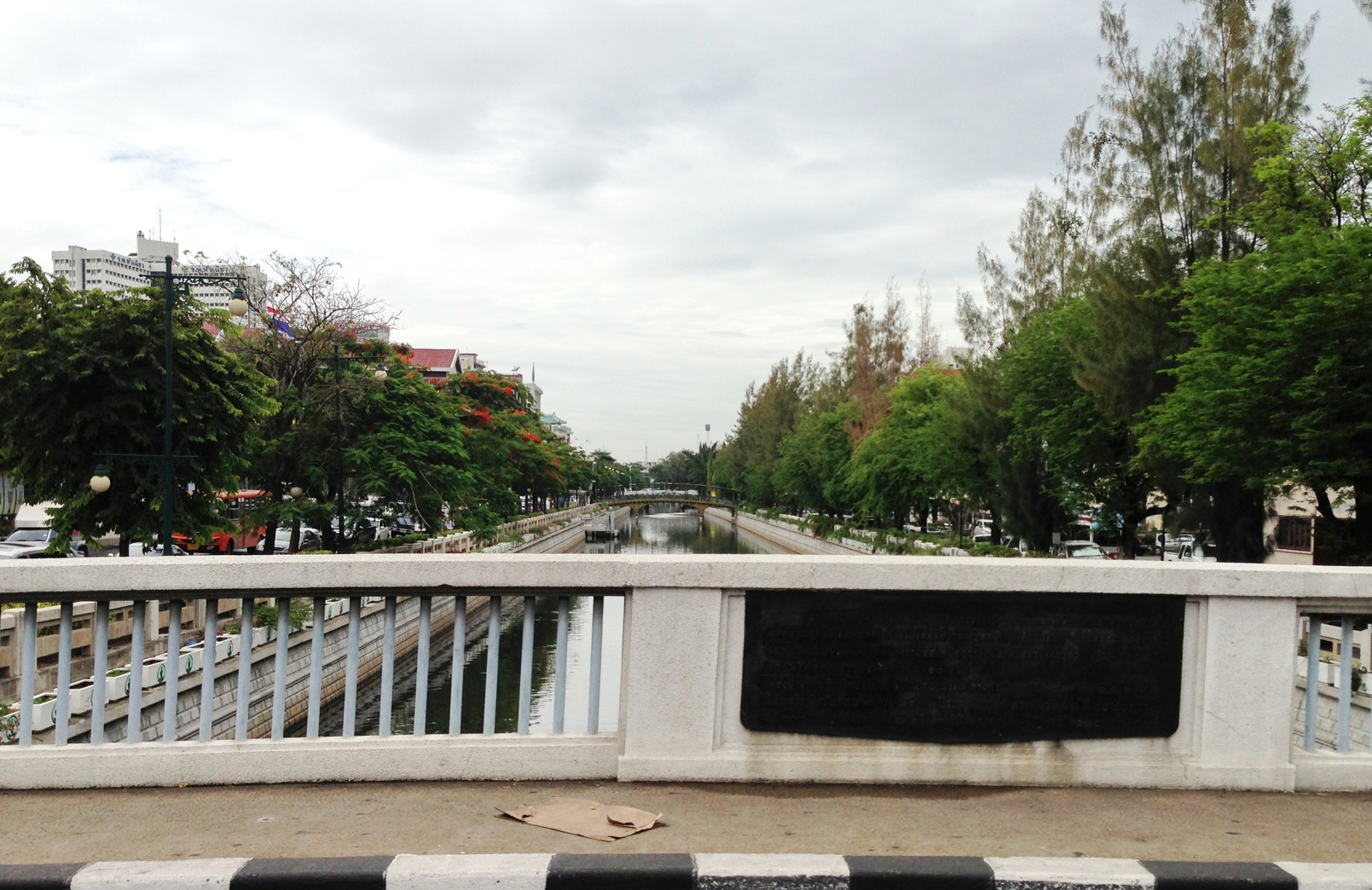
Nopphawong Bridge

- Bangkok railway station (Hua Lamphong) and the State Railway of Thailand (SRT) with Railway Police headquarters
- Department of Alternative Energy Development and Efficiency (DEDE) headquarters and Ban Bhibundhamma
- Wat Boromniwat
- Bobae Market

=== Transport ===
Rong Mueang is served by the Hua Lamphong MRT station, Bamrung Mueang Road, Rama IV Road and Khlong Phadung Krung Kasem boat service.
