= Kasat Suek =

Coordinates: 13°44′56.70″N 100°31′00.22″E

- กษัตริย์ศึก
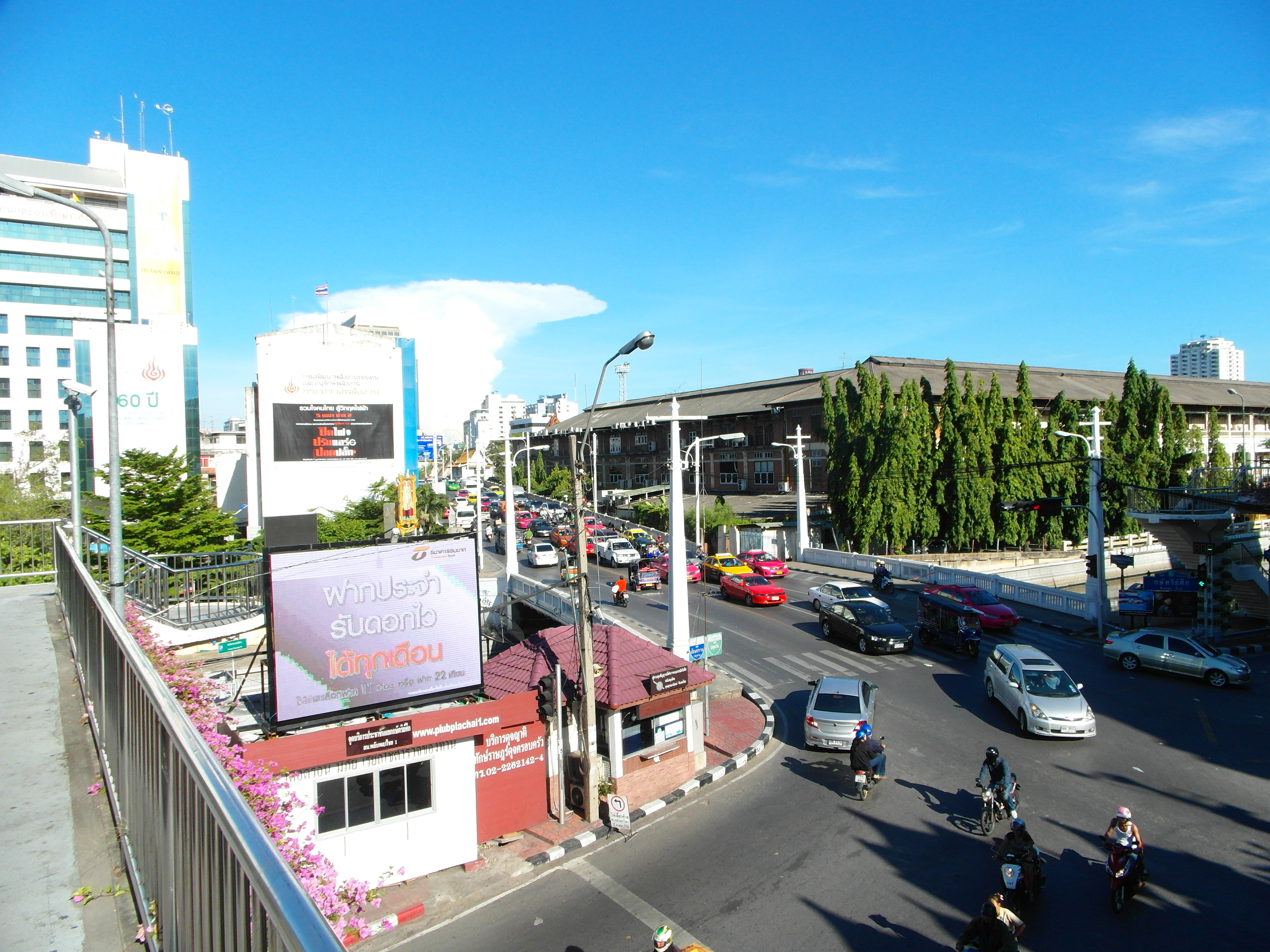
- Kasat Suek intersection in late April 2013 (view towards Kasat Suek bridge)
- Interactive map of Kasat Suek

Location
- Khlong Maha Nak and Wat Thep Sirin, Pom Prap Sattru Phai and Rong Mueang, Pathum Wan, Bangkok, Thailand
- Roads at junction: Krung Kasem (north–south); Bamrung Mueang (northwest); Rama I (southeast)

Construction
- Type: Four-way at-grade intersection and multi-way footbridge with overpass

Kasat Suek (Thai: กษัตริย์ศึก, pronounced [kā.sàt sɯ̀k]) refers to an intersection and its corresponding bridge on the periphery of Pom Prap Sattru Phai and Pathum Wan Districts, Bangkok. The intersection is also known by the names Bobae Intersection and Yotse Intersection.

== Characteristics and history ==
Kasat Suek Intersection is a four-way intersection between Rama I, Krung Kasem, and Bamrung Mueang Roads, considered to be the end of Bamrung Mueang and the beginning of Rama I. It takes its name from Kasat Suek Bridge, which is on Rama I Road next to the intersection.

Kasat Suek Bridge is composed of two sections—one across the railway tracks from the nearby Bangkok railway station—and the other across from Khlong Phadung Krung Kasem (Phadung Krung Kasem Canal) towards the intersection. Formerly a wooden bridge called "Yotse" (a name that remains more popular than "Kasat Suek" and is still used unofficially today for both the bridge and the surrounding area). The wooden bridge was built in 1906 during the reign of King Chulalongkorn (Rama V). The name "Yotse" comes from Luang Yotsesavarat (Sin), a nobleman who owned the land and allowed a bridge to be built across his property. In 1928, during the reign of King Prajadhipok (Rama VII), the deteriorated wooden bridge was rebuilt as a reinforced concrete bridge, with the name being officially changed to Kasat Suek. The king presided over the opening ceremony on 6 April 1929. The bridge was also the first overpass in Thailand.

"Kasat Suek" translates as 'king of war' and comes from the title Somdet Chaophraya Maha Kasatsuek (สมเด็จเจ้าพระยามหากษัตริย์ศึก), which belonged to King Phutthayotfa Chulalok (Rama I), founder of the Chakri dynasty and namesake of the road the bridge is on, before he became king. It is believed that he had passed through this area while returning from battle.

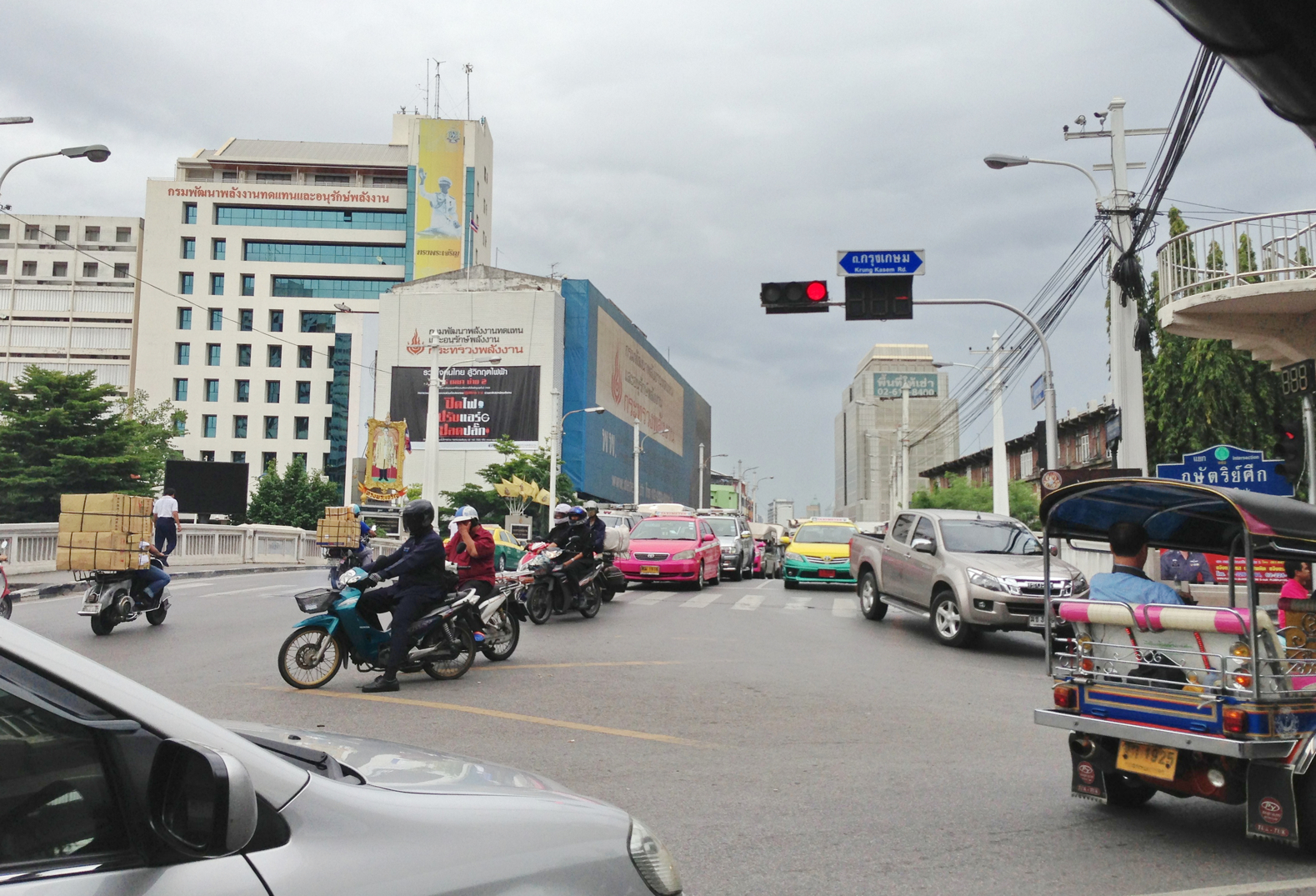
Kasat Suek intersection as seen from Bamrung Mueang Road

In the past, the intersection was known as the site of a movie theater named "Chaloem Khet" (เฉลิมเขตร์) after Princess Chalermkhetramongmol, Prince Bhanurangsi Savangwongse's youngest daughter. The theater was later demolished, though the name still exists with the alleys in this area being called Soi Chaloem Khet.

In 1907, Kasat Suek saw the first bus route in Bangkok (and all of Thailand), developed by Phraya Bhakdi Noraset (Nai Lert), which ran from the bridge along Rama I Road and led up to Pratunam in Pathum Wan District, a distance of about 2.9 km (1.8 mi). The route was not successful, as the vehicle used was a horse-drawn carriage.

== Nearby places ==
- Debsirin School
- Bobae Market
- Hua Chiew Hospital
- Hua Lamphong railway station & State Railway of Thailand (SRT)
- Department of Alternative Energy Development and Efficiency & Ban Phibuntham
