= Wat Phlapphla Chai, Bangkok =

Wat Phlapphla Chai
- วัดพลับพลาชัย
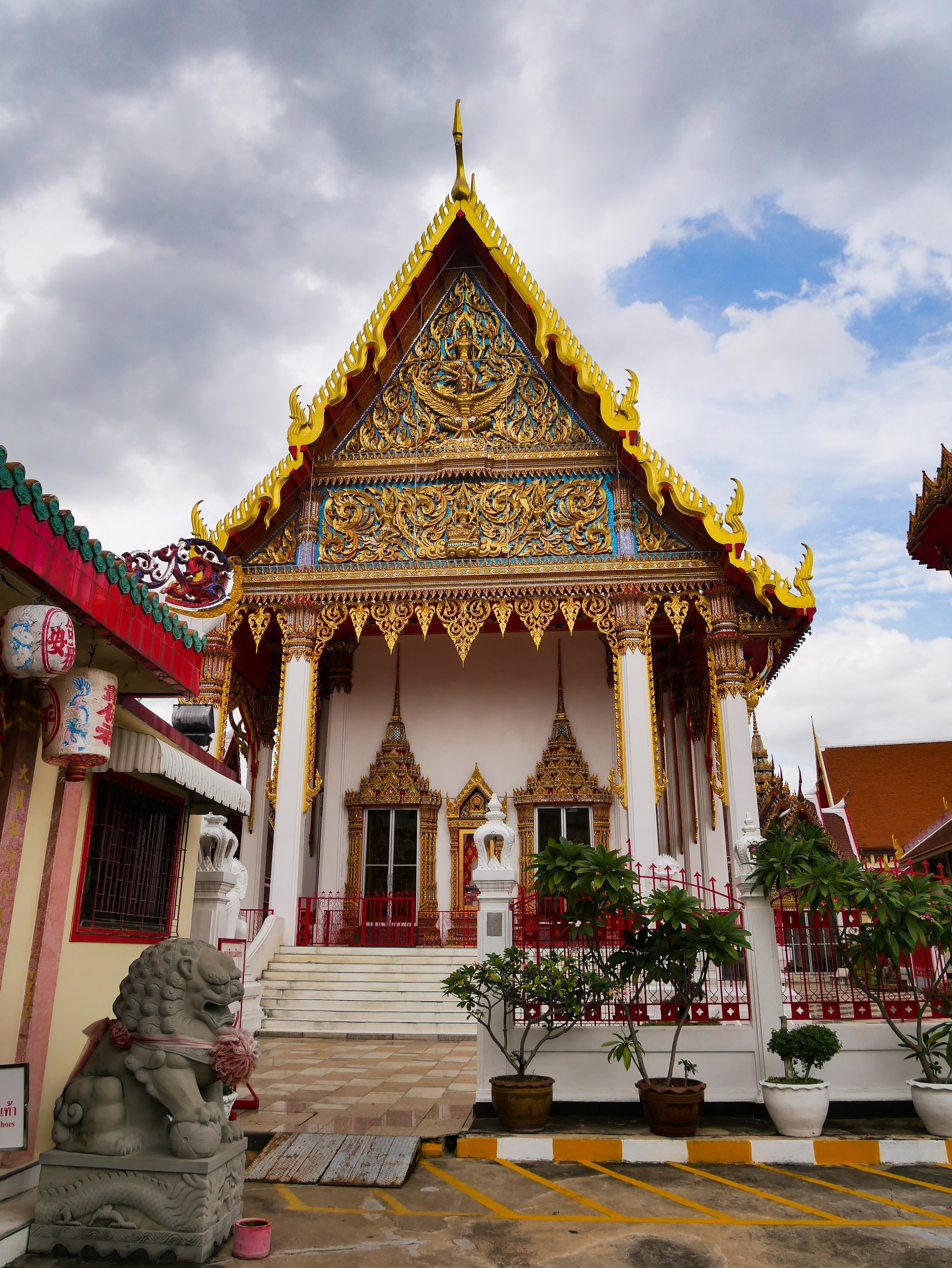
- Main hall

- Location within Bangkok

Religion
- Affiliation: Buddhism

Location
- Location: 5 Maitri Chit Rd, Pom Prap, Pom Prap Sattru Phai, Bangkok
- Country: Thailand
- Interactive map of Wat Phlapphla Chai
- Coordinates: 13.745556°N 100.513056°E

Wat Phlapphla Chai (Thai: วัดพลับพลาชัย, RTGS: Wat Phlapphla Chai, pronounced [wāt pʰláp.pʰlāː t͡ɕʰāj]) is a civil temple of Mahā Nikāya sect is believed to be built in Ayutthaya period during the reign of King Narai (1656–1682).

Initially it was called Wat Khok (วัดโคก) as it was located on khok (โคก, lit. 'the mound'). Another belief holds that the temple's original name might have been Wat Khok (วัดคอก), as the area was once the site of a royal command pavilion overseeing the royal rice fields in the Thonburi period. The term khok (คอก) in this context means an enclosure or pen used for keeping cattle and buffaloes. (Note: โคก (khok) means a small hill or mound. คอก (khok) means a pen or enclosure for animals like cattle or buffalo.)

The temple was renamed to "Wat Phlapphla Chai" in the reign of King Vajiravudh (Rama VI) as he used it as a training ground for the Wild Tiger Corps, a royal paramilitary unit under his personal patronage. The new name, meaning "Pavilion of Victory", was chosen to commemorate a historical event believed to have taken place in the area. According to local tradition, this was along the route taken by King Phutthayotfa Chulalok (Rama I), who at the time still held the title Chao Phraya Maha Kasatsuek, on his return from a military campaign in Cambodia. It is said that he set up a royal pavilion here and spent one night before entering the inner city.

The site of the temple is believed to have once been an execution ground, a conclusion drawn from the numerous human skeletons unearthed around the temple during the construction of a road through the area in the reign of King Chulalongkorn (Rama V). The intersection created where this road met other streets became known as the Ha Yaek Phlapphla Chai (Thai: ห้าแยกพลับพลาไชย, lit. 'Phlapphla Chai five-way intersection'), and the surrounding neighbourhood eventually came to be called Phlapphla Chai as well.

Today, the temple stands at the southeast corner of the intersection where Maitri Chit Road meets Luang Road, at the northernmost end of Bangkok's Chinatown district.
