= Hong Taechawanit =

Chinese businessman and philanthropist

Hong Techawanit
- 鄭義豐 ฮง เตชะวณิช
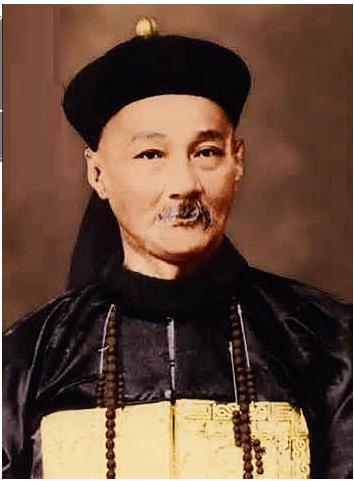
- Born: 1851; Teochew, Canton, China
- Died: 5 March 1937 (aged 85–86); Bangkok, Thailand
- Occupations: Businessman and philanthropist

Hong Techawanit (Thai: ฮง เตชะวณิช; 1851–5 March 1937), born Tan Gihong (Chinese: 鄭義豐; pinyin: Zhèng Yìfēng) and also nicknamed as Yi Ko Hong (Note: Chinese: 二哥豐, lit. 'Second Brother Hong', pinyin: Èr Gē Fēng; Thai: ยี่กอฮง), was a prominent Thai Chinese (Teochew) businessman, philanthropist, and secret society member active in late-nineteenth to early-twentieth century.

== Life ==
=== Early years ===
Sources diverge on Hong's origins. Thai accounts hold he was born in Bangkok in 1851, the son of Khia Tae, a Teochew immigrant, and Keut, a Thai woman. After his parents' early deaths, he was raised by relatives in Guangdong Province, China, before returning to Siam at age sixteen (1866/1867).

Chinese sources state he was born in Qiyuan Village, Chao'an County, Chaozhou, Guangdong. His father, Zheng Shisheng (鄭詩生), fled China during the First Opium War but died en route to Thailand. After his mother remarried, Yifeng moved to Thailand and settled in Bangkok.

=== Career ===
While working for gambling magnate Liu Jibin (劉繼賓), Hong joined the clandestine triad society Tian Di Hui (Chinese: 天地會, lit. 'Heaven and Earth Society') in Bangkok Chinatown. He eventually ascended to the second-in-command position (and earned his nickname), and succeeded the leadership after Liu's death.

Hong successfully petitioned King Chulalongkorn (Rama V) for tax farming rights over gambling houses. In 1909, he dissented from popular Chinese sentiment against tax reforms and refused to join a three-day strike. In June 1918, he was granted the noble title Phra Anuwat Ratchaniyom (พระอนุวัฒน์ราชนิยม) and a Thai surname Taechawanit (Note: Originally romanized as Tejavanija) by King Vajiravudh (Rama VI).

He built a conglomerate comprising pawnshops, a printing press, a shipping line, a theatre, and the biggest gambling house in the country. His mansion in Phlapphla Chai served as his company headquarters.

He financed schools in Thailand and China, newspapers, charities, and flood relief in Guangdong (380,000 silver dollars in 1918).

=== Final years ===
In the last years of Qing Empire, Hong sympathised with the revolutionary Kuomintang led by Sun Yat-sen, donating ivory to help funding their revolutionary causes, and Sun returned the favour by giving him the name Zheng Zhiyong (Chinese: 鄭智勇, lit. 'wise and brave') after succeeding in the 1911 revolution and ascending the presidency. After losing his tax farming license, he died on 5 March 1937, aged 84.

== Legacy ==
Techawanit Road, which he financed, is named after him. His mansion became the present-day Phlapphachai Police Station. Deified as a 'luck-bringer', he remains worshipped by Thai gamblers.
