= Ministry of Energy (Thailand) =

Government ministry of Thailand

- กระทรวงพลังงาน
- Seal of lokuttara (transcendence)

- Flag of lokuttara (transcendence)

Ministry overview
- Formed: 3 October 2002; 23 years ago
- Jurisdiction: Government of Thailand
- Headquarters: Chatuchak, Bangkok
- Annual budget: 2,319 million baht (FY2019)
- Minister responsible: Akanat Promphan, Minister
- Ministry executive: Prasert Sinsukprasert, Permanent Secretary
- Website: energy.go.th/en/home

The Ministry of Energy of the Kingdom of Thailand (Abrv: MoE; Thai: กระทรวงพลังงาน, RTGS: Krasuang Phalangngan) is a cabinet ministry in the Government of Thailand. Its budget for fiscal year 2019 (1 October 2018–30 September 2019) is 2,319 million baht.

== History ==
Disparate energy departments were consolidated by the government with the establishment of the National Energy Policy Committee in 1992 (B.E.2535) under the National Energy Policy Council Act (1992). It is responsible for managing the energy sector in Thailand, including granting energy operating licenses and issuing energy pricing regulations. Thaksin Shinawatra, then prime minister in 2002, established the Bureau of Energy on 2 November 2001, B.E.2544, which was later upgraded to the Ministry of Energy in 2002 pursuant to the Restructuring of Government Organization Act (2002).

== Organization ==
=== Administration ===
- Office of the Minister
- Office of the Permanent Secretary

=== Dependent departments ===
- Department of Mineral Fuels
- Department of Energy Business
- Department of Alternative Energy Development and Efficiency (DEDE)
- Energy Policy and Planning Office

=== State enterprises ===
- Electricity Generating Authority of Thailand (EGAT)
- PTT Public Company Limited

=== Public Organizations ===
- Energy Fund Administration Institute

== Thailand Power Development Plan 2015-2036 (PDP2025) ==
Thailand's Power Development Plan (PDP). is the nation's roadmap for electric power generation, distribution, and consumption. The plan, prepared by the Ministry of Energy (MOE) and EGAT, is issued iteratively. The previous edition, PDP2010 Revision 3, covered the years 2012-2030.

Along with the PDP, the MOE produces several subsidiary plans that roll up into the PDP:

- Energy Efficiency Development Plan (EEDP)
- Alternative Energy Development Plan (AEDP)
- Natural Gas Supply Plan
- Petroleum Management Plan

PDP2015 begins with the assumptions that:

- Thailand's average GDP growth over the period 2014-2036 will be 3.94 percent annually
- Thailand's population growth over the same period will average 0.03 percent annually
- Energy savings over the period as forecasted in the EEDP will total 89,672 GWh
- Renewables, including domestic hydro, will supply 19,634.4 MW of power over the period
- Thailand's new power demands will grow 2.67 percent annually, 2014-2036
- In 2036 Thailand's peak electricity demand will be 49,655 MW and that total electricity demand will be 326,119 GWh

PDP2015 projects the following changes in Thailand electrical power generation fuel mix over the period 2014-2036:

- Imported hydro-power: Rising from 7 percent in 2014 to 15-20 percent in 2036
- Coal/lignite: Flat to rising from 20 percent to 20-25 percent
- Renewables, including domestic hydro: Rising from 8 percent to 15-20 percent
- Natural gas: Declining from 64 percent to 30-40 percent
- Nuclear: Rising from 0 percent to 0-5 percent
- Diesel/fuel oil: Declining from 1 percent to zero

PDP2015 projects that Thailand's CO_{2} emissions from power generation will rise from 86,998,000 tons in 2015 to 104,075,000 tons in 2036.
