= Suea Pa Road =

Street in Bangkok, Thailand

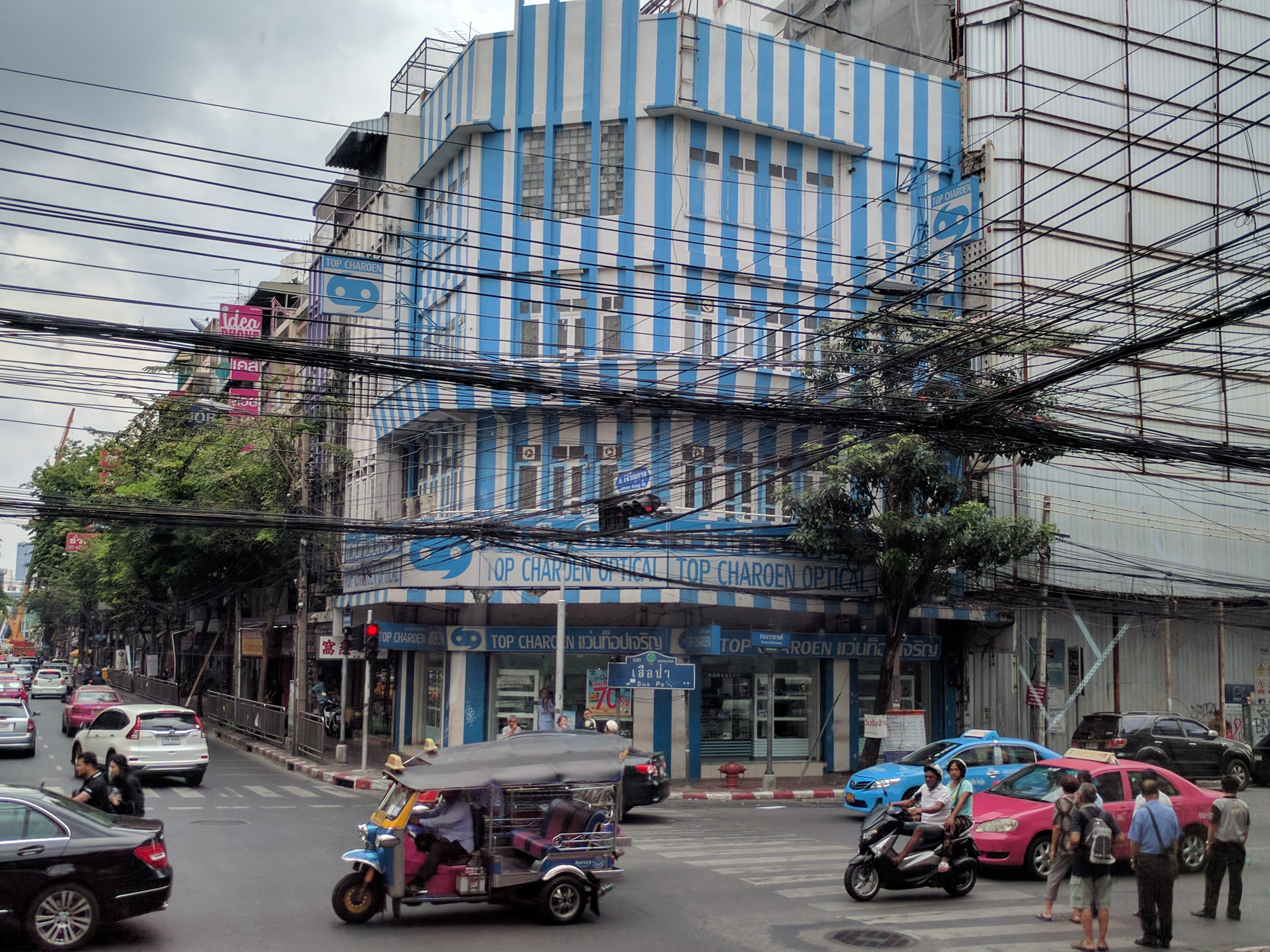
- Suea Pa Intersection seen from Charoen Krung Road (looking towards Wat Mangkon Kamalawat)
- Interactive map of Suea Pa Road
- Native name: ถนนเสือป่า
- Namesake: Aw Boon Haw and Aw Boon Par
- Length: 500 m (1,600 ft)
- Location: Pom Prap Sattru Phai, Bangkok, Thailand
- Coordinates: 13°44′44″N 100°30′34″E
- Northeast end: Rong Phayaban Klang Intersection
- Southwest end: Suea Pa Intersection

Suea Pa Road, also written as Sueapa or Sua Pa (Thai: ถนนเสือป่า, RTGS: Thanon Suea Pa, pronounced [tʰā.nǒn sɯ̌a̯ pàː]; lit. 'wild tiger road') is a road and intersection in the same name in Bangkok. It is a short road located at the southern end of Pom Prap Subdistrict, in Pom Prap Sattru Phai District. After crossing Charoen Krung Road at its namesake intersection, in the area of Samphanthawong Subdistrict, Samphanthawong District, it continues as Ratchawong Road.

The road begins at Rong Phayaban Klang Intersection, where it intersects with Luang and Yukol 2 Roads. BMA General Hospital (also known as Klang Hospital) is located on the southeast corner of this intersection.

Suea Pa Road was constructed during the reign of King Vajiravudh (Rama VI) in 1921, following a major fire that broke out in Tambon Trok Tao Hu, on Charoen Krung Road. On September 3, 1921, a large portion of Pom Prap Sattru Phai was severely damaged. The area had densely packed housing and insufficient road infrastructure, which made it difficult to prevent or respond to such disasters in time.

In response, the Ministry of Metropolitan (the predecessor of today's Ministry of Interior and the Bangkok Metropolitan Administration), led by Minister Chao Phraya Yommarat (Pan Sukhum), requested the construction of a new road. The request was granted, and the road was officially named by the King on October 20, 1921.

It is commonly believed that the name "Suea Pa" comes from the Wild Tiger Corps, a paramilitary organization under the personal command of King Rama VI. However, the name actually originates from the brand Tiger Balm, a well-known analgesic heat rub created by Aw Boon Haw (Chinese: 胡文虎) and Aw Boon Par (Chinese: 胡文豹), two overseas Chinese brothers who donated generously to many countries in the region, including Siam. When referred to together, their names evoke the idea of a "wild tiger", which inspired the road's name.

In the 1940s and 1950s, Suea Pa Road and its continuation, Ratchawong Road, were considered the financial and economic center of Bangkok. Major international banks and well-known restaurants lined both sides of the roads, as Silom and Sathon had not yet developed into the prominent business districts they are today.

Today, Suea Pa Road is widely known as a major wholesale and retail hub for mobile phone accessories, IT equipment, and electrical goods, along with the nearby Khlong Thom area.
