= Phlapphla Chai =

Road in Bangkok, Thailand

Coordinates: 13°44′47.04″N 100°30′42.43″E

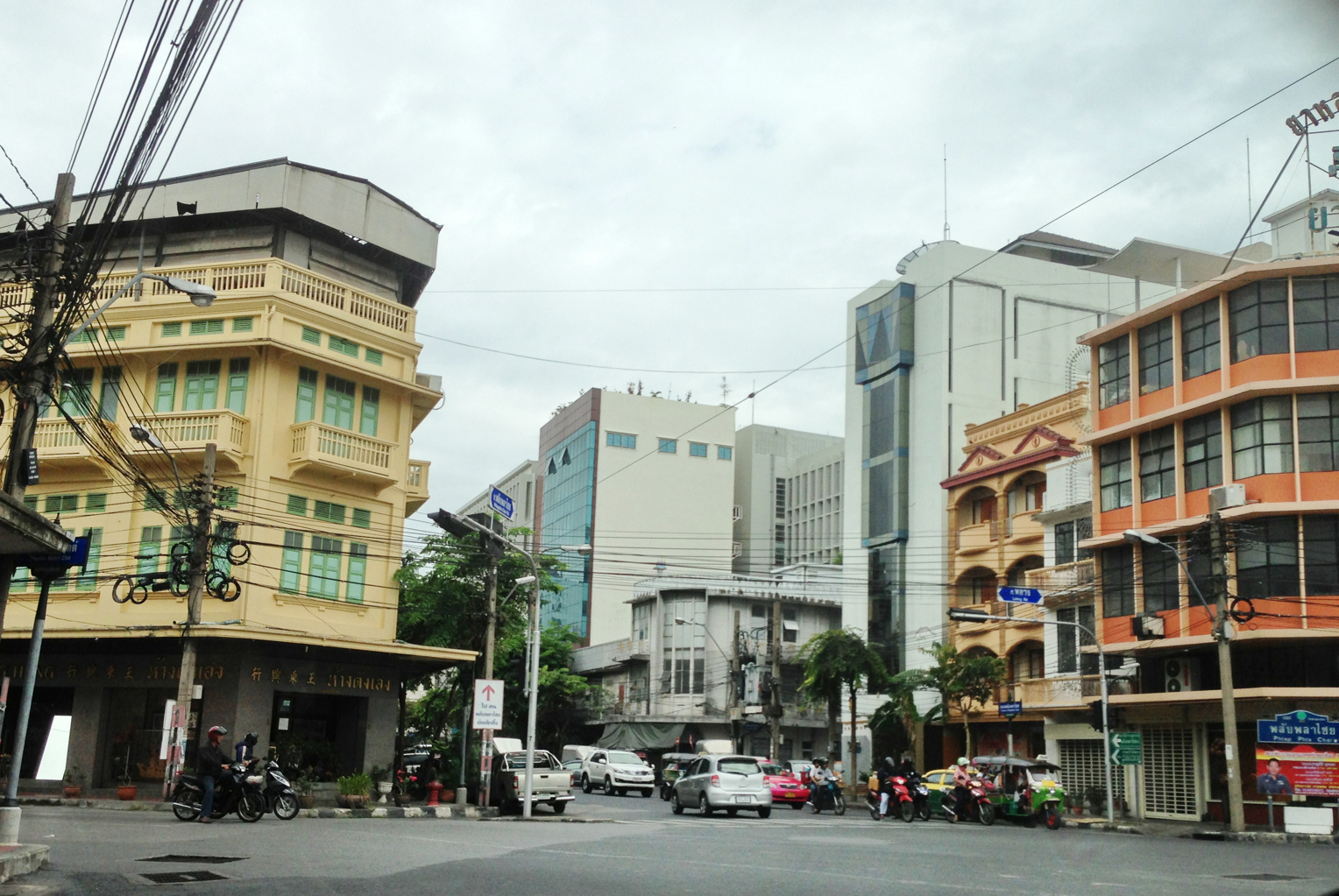
Phlapphla Chai Intersection

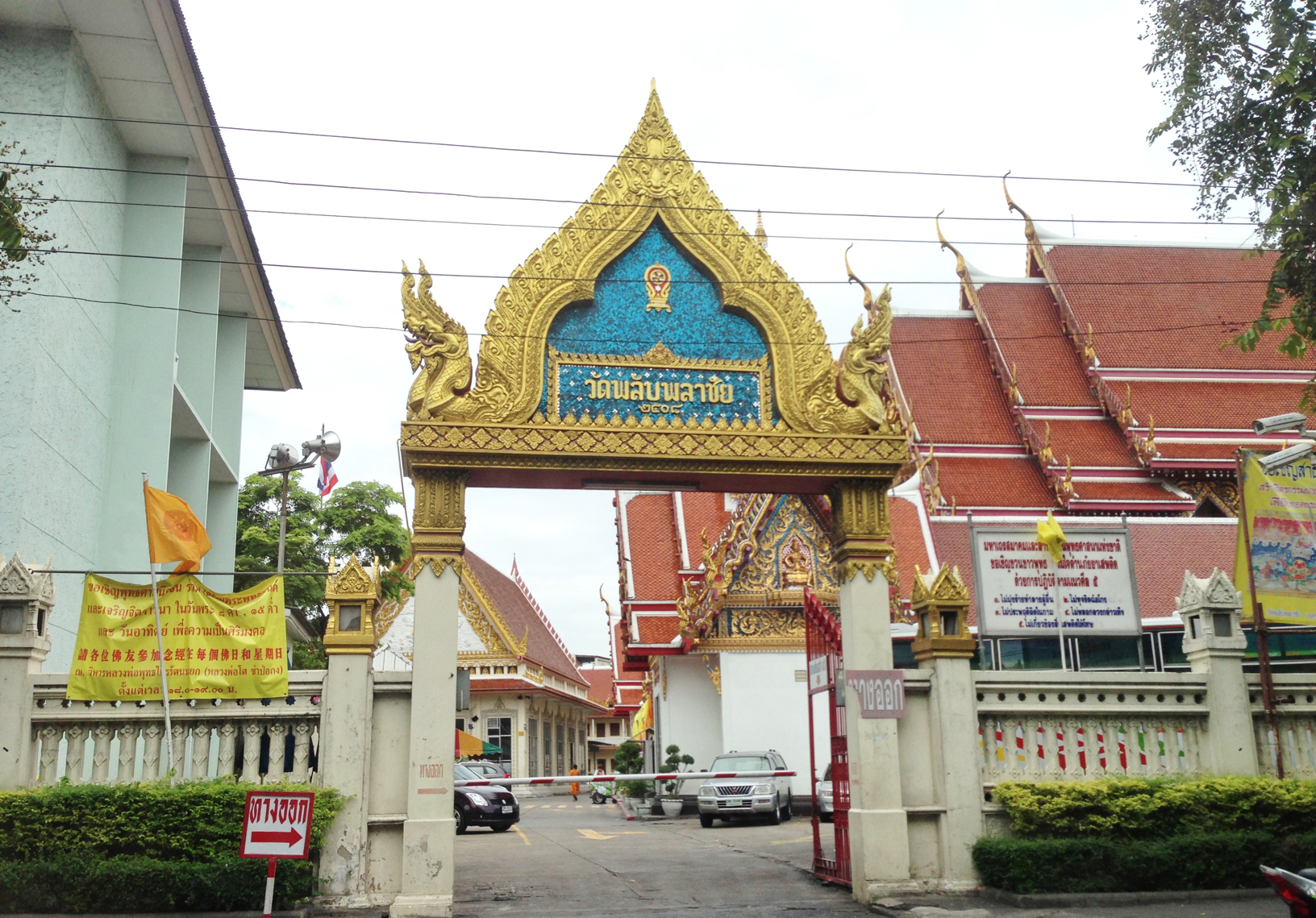
The temple's entrance gate (on the Luang Road side)

Phlapphla Chai (Thai: พลับพลาไชย, pronounced [pʰláp.pʰlāː t͡ɕʰāj]) is the name of a road in Bangkok's Pom Prap and Wat Thep Sirin sub-districts, Pom Prap Sattru Phai District, and also the five-way intersection of the road with Luang and Maitri Chit Roads. It is also the name of the surrounding area in the northernmost of Bangkok's Chinatown.

== The route ==
Phlapphla Chai Road branches off from the west side of Charoen Krung Road at Plaeng Nam Intersection, extending north and intersecting Luang and Maitri Chit Roads at Phlapphla Chai Intersection, continuing north until it reaches Bamrung Mueang Road in the Suan Mali quarter, with a total length of about 1.1 km (0.68 mi).

BMTA's bus line 2-9 (53) (inner city loop) is the only line running on this road (only in the section between Phlapphla Chai Intersection and the end of the road).

Along the road are Li Ti Meow Shrine, Wat Khanikaphon, Poh Teck Tung Foundation, Phlapphla Chai Police Stations 1 and 2, Tai Hong Kong Shrine, and Wat Thepsirin.

== History ==
The name "Phlapphla Chai" comes from Wat Phlapphla Chai (วัดพลับพลาไชย), a Thai Buddhist temple situated at the southeast corner of the intersection. The temple dates back to the Ayutthaya period and was originally known as Wat Khok (วัดโคก). The surrounding area once served as execution grounds, and numerous human skeletons have been unearthed. Furthermore, the edge of the temple was the location of Pom Prap Sattru Phai, one of the eight forts constructed along Khlong Phadung Krung Kasem during the reign of King Mongkut (Rama IV); this fort later lent its name to the present-day Pom Prap Sattru Phai District. The temple was renamed Wat Phlapphla Chai during the reign of King Vajiravudh (Rama VI), when the area was used as a practice ground for the Wild Tiger Corps, a royal paramilitary unit founded by the king. The word phlapphla means 'pavilion', and Wat Phlapphla Chai translates as "Victory Pavilion Temple", referring to the temporary pavilion erected by King Phutthayotfa Chulalok (Rama I) in the area when he was still known as Chao Phraya Maha Kasat Suek, returning from a military campaign against the Khmer in 1782.

Phlapphla Chai Road was constructed during the reign of King Chulalongkorn (Rama V). It could not be built in a straight line due to obstruction from the Meng Soon Building, which belonged to a landlord under French protection. At the time, France held extraterritorial rights in Siam and refused to allow expropriation of its subject's property. Chinese businessman Hong Taechawanit later donated his mansion on Phlapphla Chai Road to the government, and it was converted into what is now the Phlapphla Chai Police Station.

On the evening of 3 July 1974, the area became the site of the "Chinatown Riots", a violent incident that left 26 dead and more than 120 injured. The unrest began when two police officers arrested a taxi driver for illegal parking. The driver resisted and shouted that he was being assaulted, attracting a crowd to the Phlapphla Chai Police Station. Tensions escalated quickly, and the disturbance spread to nearby locations such as Hua Lamphong, the 22 July Circle, King Chulalongkorn Memorial Hospital, Rama IV Road, and Wang Burapha. Protesters set fire to public buildings, hurled explosives, and opened fire on the police, who were initially unable to regain control. The riots lasted for four days until the government, led by Prime Minister Sanya Dharmasakti, declared a state of emergency. Order was eventually restored after military and police forces were deployed to suppress the uprising. This incident is widely regarded as the first major public revolt since the October 14 uprising the previous year. In its aftermath, the Ministry of Interior issued an official statement, stating that the unrest had stemmed from a violent confrontation between two local mafia factions known as the Dragon Gang and the Eagle Gang.

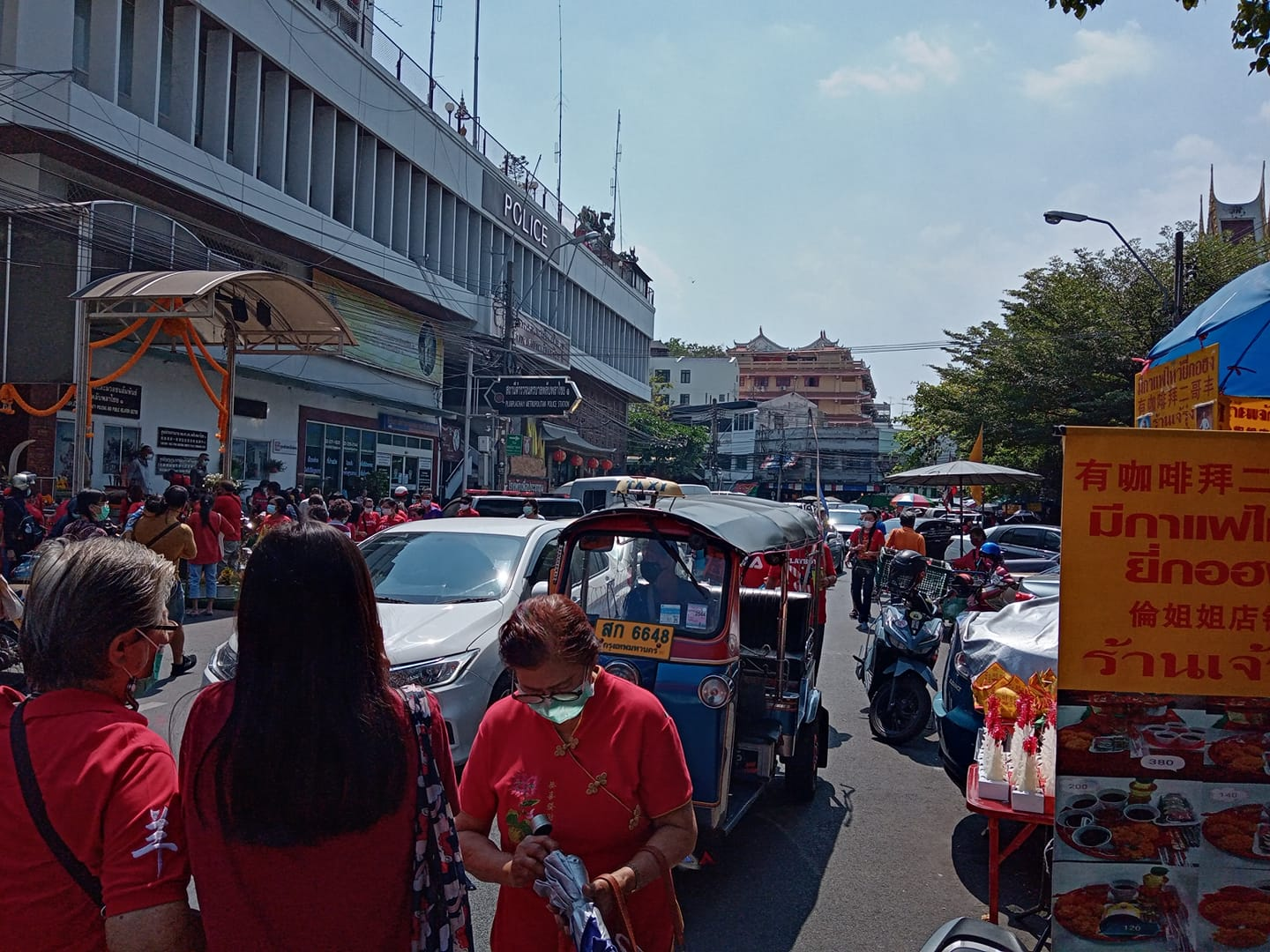
Phlapphla Chai Road bustling with people dressed in red for good fortune during Chinese New Year 2021, in the area of the Poh Teck Tung Foundation, home to the Tai Hong Kong Shrine (Phlapphla Chai Police Station is on the left).

Today, Phlapphla Chai remains one of the areas in Bangkok with a high concentration of Sino-Thai residents. Located near Yaowarat and Charoen Krung Roads, the area is home to numerous restaurants and street food vendors, some of which have been recognised with Bib Gourmand distinctions by the Michelin Guide. In the past, it was also known as a hub for photography equipment shops.
