= Wat Thep Sirin subdistrict =

Wat Thep Sirin วัดเทพศิรินทร์
- Khwaeng
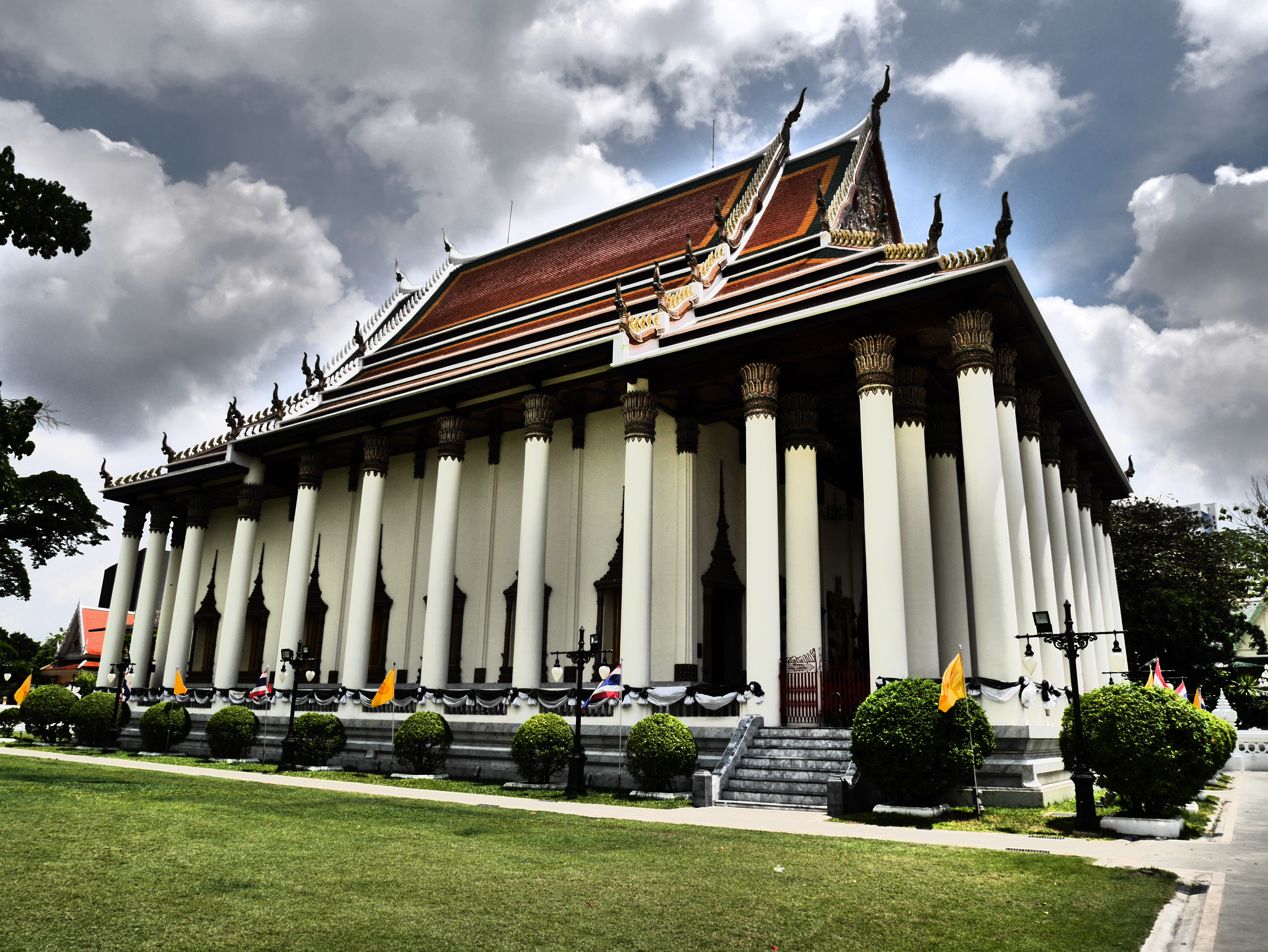
- The eponymous Wat Thep Sirin

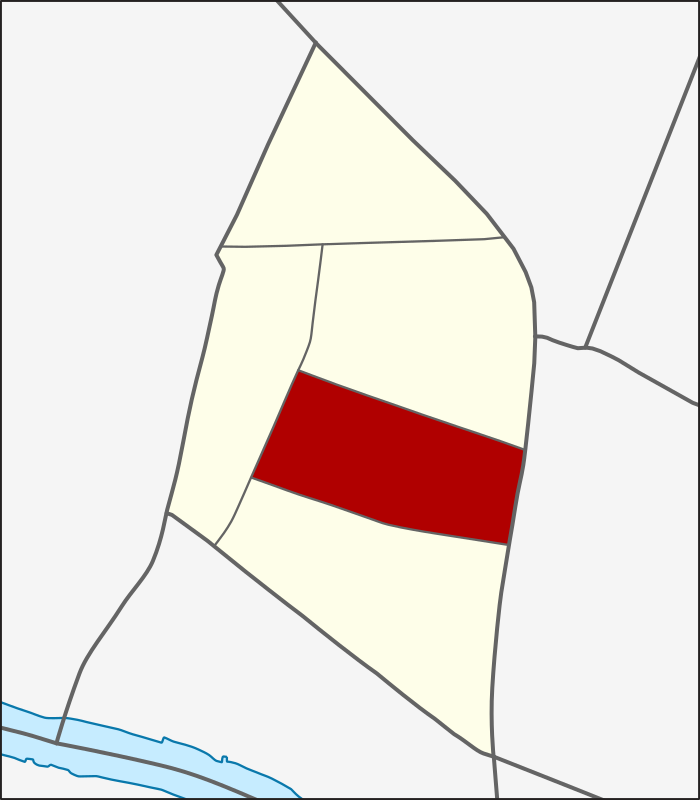
- Location in Pom Prap Sattru Phai District
- Country: Thailand
- Province: Bangkok
- Khet: Pom Prap Sattru Phai

Area
  - Total: 0.347 km^{2} (0.134 sq mi)

Population (2018)
  - Total: 6,909
- Time zone: UTC+7 (ICT)
- Postal code: 10100
- TIS 1099: 100802

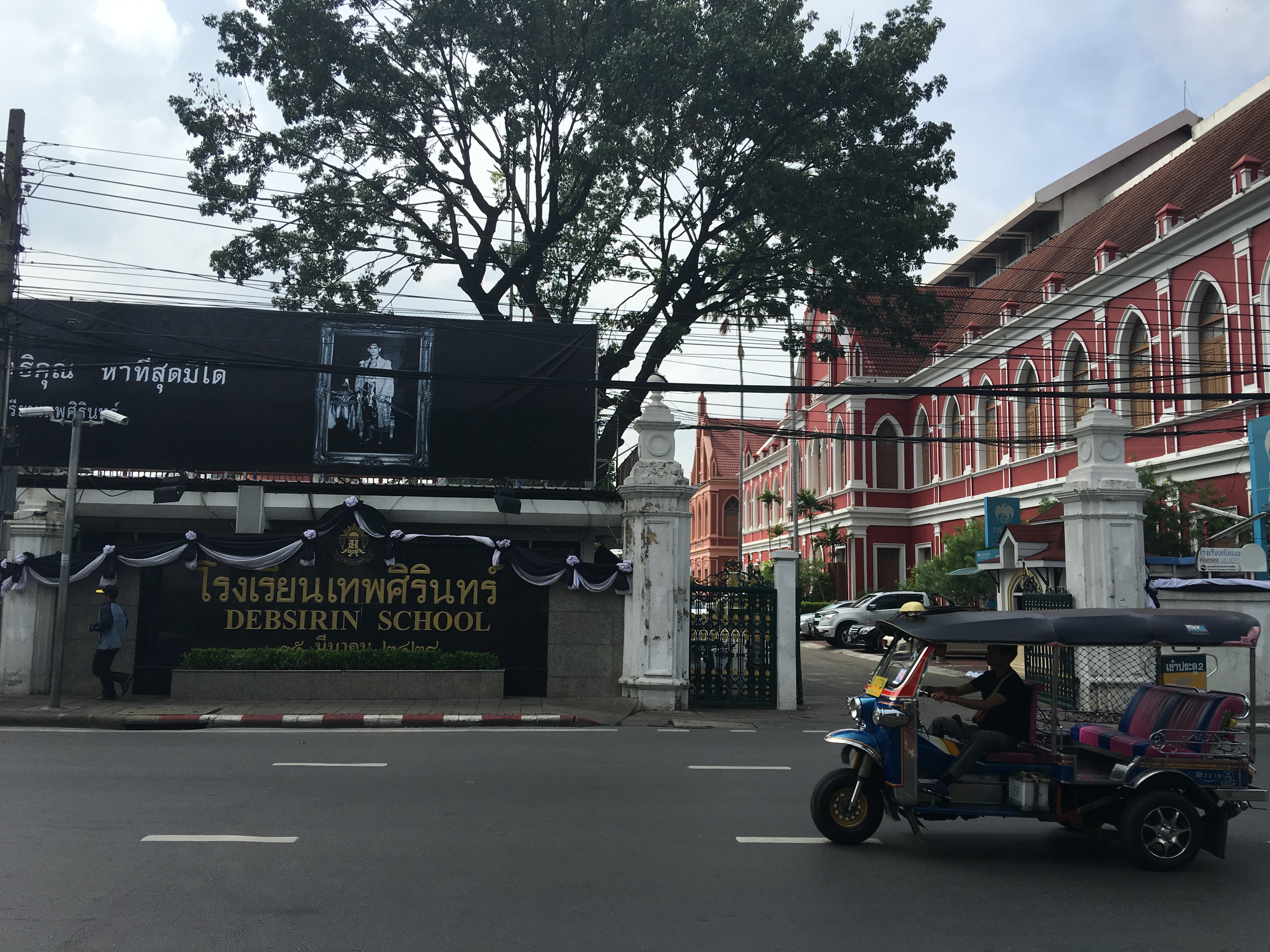
Tuk-tuk on Krung Kasem Road, passing in front of Debsirin School, one of the oldest boys' schools in the country

Wat Thep Sirin subdistrict (Thai: วัดเทพศิรินทร์, pronounced [wát tʰêːp.sì.rīn]) is a khwaeng (subdistrict) of Pom Prap Sattru Phai district in Bangkok.

== History ==
Wat Deb Sirin (sometimes written as Wat Debsirin), is a royal temple named in honour of Queen Debsirindra, wife of King Mongkut (Rama IV) and mother of King Chulalongkorn (Rama V).

The area originally was known as Suan Mali (สวนมะลิ, lit. ''jasmine garden'') and Rong Liang Dek (โรงเลี้ยงเด็ก, lit. ''child care house''). Both of them are tambon in Pom Prap Sattru Phai District, Phra Nakhon Province (now Bangkok).

Rong Liang Dek was the first nursery in Thailand, it was founded in 1890 by Princess Saisavali Bhiromya, the royal consort of King Chulalongkorn, following the loss of her eldest daughter (Princess Nabhachara Chamrassri) at the age of five years to typhoid in 1889. She established the nursery to adopt orphans north of Suan Mali. After it opened, she named all children herself, before whose names she prefixed the word Bun ('good deed').

The nursery was demolished, but its name still appears as a soi (lit. ''alleyway'') on left side of Bamrung Mueang Road called Soi Rong Liang Dek or Trok Rong Liang Dek and it is in the area of neighbouring Khlong Maha Nak Subdistrict.

In 1940, Suan Mali and Rong Liang Dek were merged with Wat Thep Sirin.

== Geography ==
Wat Thep Sirin borders four subdistricts (from the north clockwise): Khlong Maha Nak (Bamrung Mueang Road is the dividing line), Rong Mueang of Pathum Wan District (Khlong Phadung Krung Kasem is the dividing line), Pom Prap (Luang Road is the boundary), and Ban Bat (Worachak Road is the boundary).

Phlapphla Chai Road runs south from Pom Prap and ends at the junction where it joins with Bamrung Mueang Road.

== Places ==
- Wat Thep Sirin
- Debsirin School
- Yotse Bridge
- Wat Thewi Worayat
- Wat Disa Nukaram
- Suan Mali Fire & Rescue Station
- Yotse Medical Clinic
