= Department of Alternative Energy Development and Efficiency =

Department of Thailand's Energy Ministry

- กรมพัฒนาพลังงานทดแทนและอนุรักษ์พลังงาน
- Current seal
- Former seal
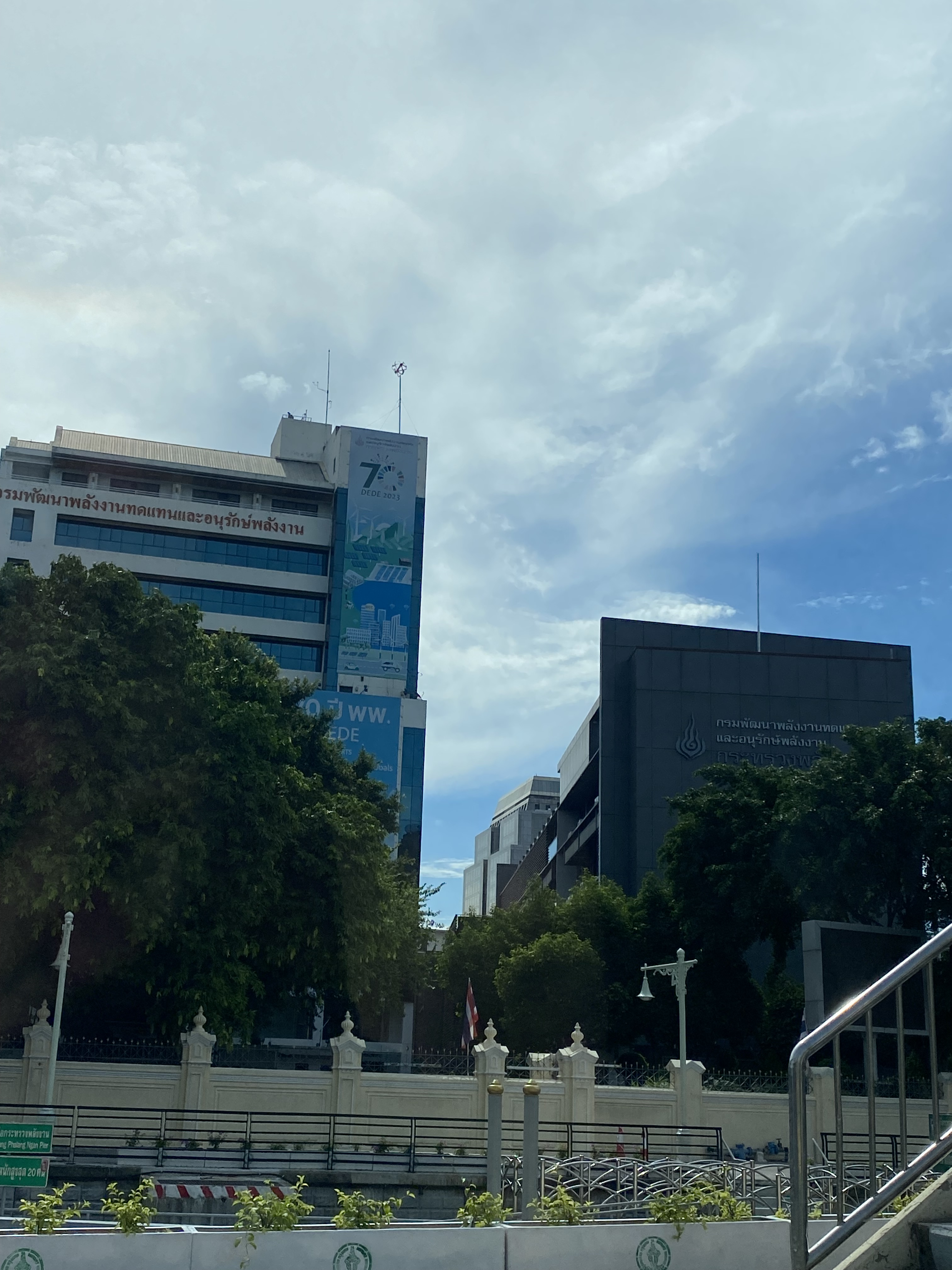

Agency overview
- Headquarters: Pathum Wan, Bangkok, Thailand
- Employees: 425 (As of 30 September 2015)
- Annual budget: 1,093 million baht (FY2019)
- Agency executive: Wattanapong Kurovat, Director-General
- Parent department: Ministry of Energy
- Website: weben.dede.go.th/webmax/

The Department of Alternative Energy Development and Efficiency (DEDE) is a department of Thailand's Energy Ministry. It is responsible for driving Thailand's move to renewable energy production while reducing the nation's overall energy consumption.

== History ==
- 7 January 1953: Created as the "National Energy Authority" under the Office of the Prime Minister
- 23 May 1963: Moved to the Ministry of National Development
- 1 October 1971: Renamed "National Energy Administration" (NEA) and returned to the Office of the Prime Minister
- 24 March 1979: Moved to the Ministry of Science, Technology, and Energy
- 13 February 1992: Renamed the "Department of Energy Development and Promotion" (DEDP)
- 3 October 2002: Assumed its present name, the "Department of Alternative Energy Development and Efficiency" reporting to the Energy Ministry

== Budget ==
DEDE's budget for FY2019 is 1,093 million baht. The department employed 425 staffers as of 30 September 2015

== Vision ==
DEDE's vision is "To become a leader in alternative energy development and energy efficiency in Asia by 2036."

== Thailand's energy plans ==
Thailand's "Energy Efficiency Plan 2015" (EEP2015) and "Alternative Energy Development Plan 2015-2036" (AEDP2015) lay out the nation's plans to conserve energy and move to renewable energy. Both plans have the same period, ending in 2036. AEDP's goal is for renewable energy to contribute 30% of Thailand's total energy production by 2036. AEDP2015 aims to use renewable sources to produce 19,684 megawatts (MW) of power by 2036: 6,000 MW from solar energy, 5,570 MW from biomass, 3,002 MW from wind power, and 2,906 MW from hydropower. The remainder will be generated using other means, such as 550 MW from garbage; 600 MW from waste and waste water; 376 MW from small hydropower plants; and 680 MW from energy crops. The goal of EEP2015 is to reduce energy intensity (EI) by 30% by 2036 (base year 2010).
