= Luang Road =

Road in downtown Bangkok

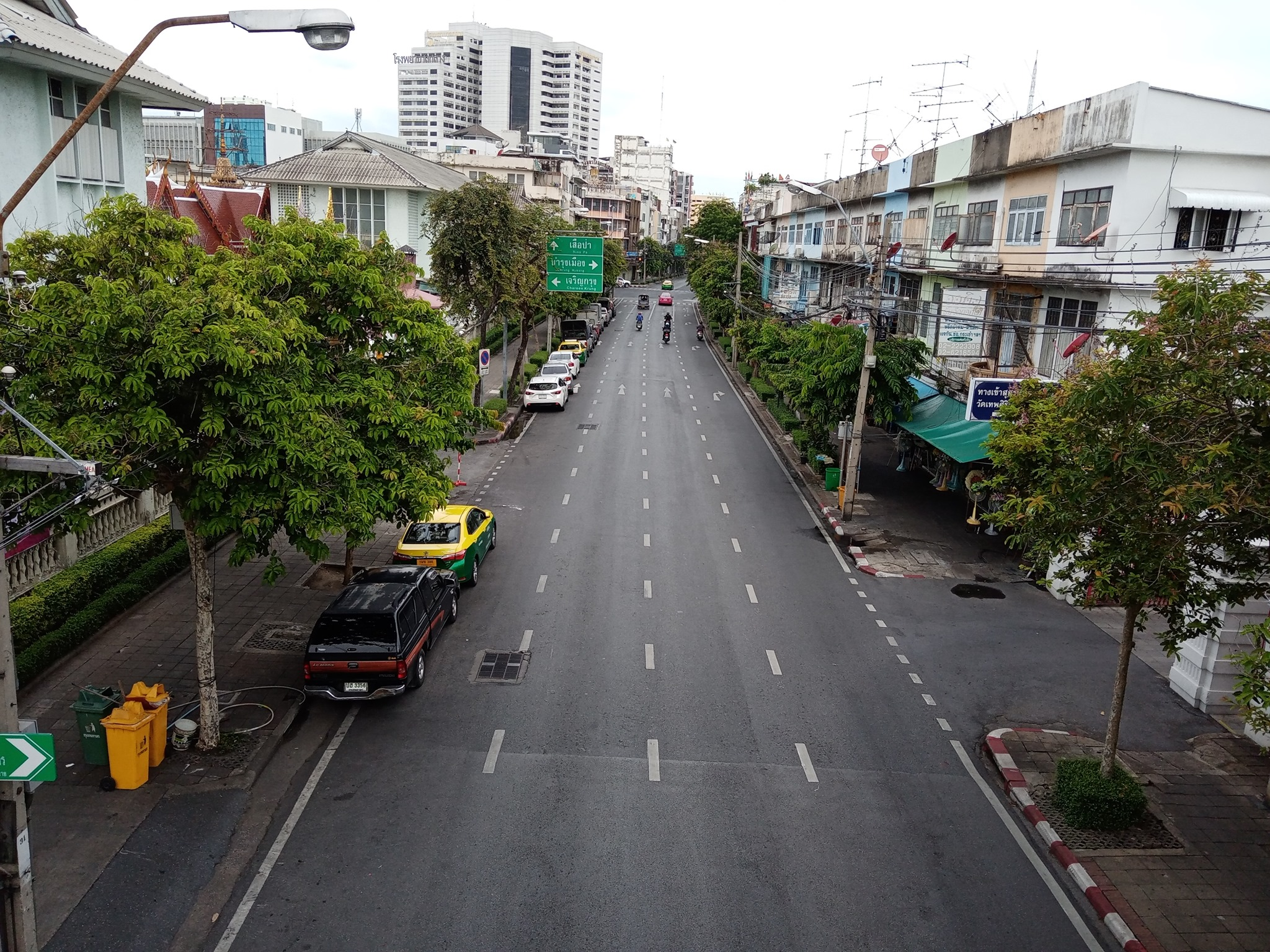
- Luang Road as seen from footbridge near Wat Debsirin, Phlapphla Chai Intersection and Klang Hospital are ahead.
- Interactive map of Luang Road
- Native name: ถนนหลวง
- Length: 1.8 km (1.1 mi)
- Location: Bangkok, Thailand
- Coordinates: 13°44′51″N 100°30′37″E
- Northwest end: Ruan Cham Junction, Phra Nakhon
- Southeast end: Nopphawong Bridge, Pathum Wan

Luang Road (Thai: ถนนหลวง, RTGS: Thanon Luang, pronounced [tʰā.nǒn lǔa̯ŋ]) is a short street in downtown Bangkok, stretching only 1.8 km (1.1 mi).

It starts at Ruan Cham Junction on Maha Chai Road, in front of the former Special Bangkok Metropolitan Prison (now the Bangkok Corrections Museum), and runs southeast to Krung Kasem Road, near the corner opposite Bangkok railway station, also known as Hua Lamphong station.

The road dates back to 1893, when Prince Bidyalabh Pruethidhada, then Minister of Public Works, proposed to King Chulalongkorn (Rama V) the construction of a new road to link Charoen Krung and Bamrung Mueang Roads. The planned route would run from Suea Thayan Fort, cross the outer city moat (Khlong Ong Ang), pass Wat Debsirin, and end at the railway station. It would follow the line of the canal now known as Krung Kasem Road. The King named it "Luang", meaning "royal", as it was intended to serve travellers heading to the station.

Although short, Luang Road crosses two bridges.

The first is Raphi Phatthanaphak Bridge, located at the beginning of the road. It was named by the King in honour of his son, Prince Raphi Phatthanasak, and is believed to have been completed in 1897 alongside the road. The current structure is reinforced concrete, with gently curved sidewalls, cast iron railings, and plaques inscribed with the bridge's name and its restoration year (1962). Metal lampposts stand at each corner.

The bridge spans Khlong Ong Ang, also officially known as Khlong Rop Krung, and is part of a line of bridges that includes Damrong Sathit, Bhanubandhu, Han, Bophit Phimuk, and Osathanond Bridges.

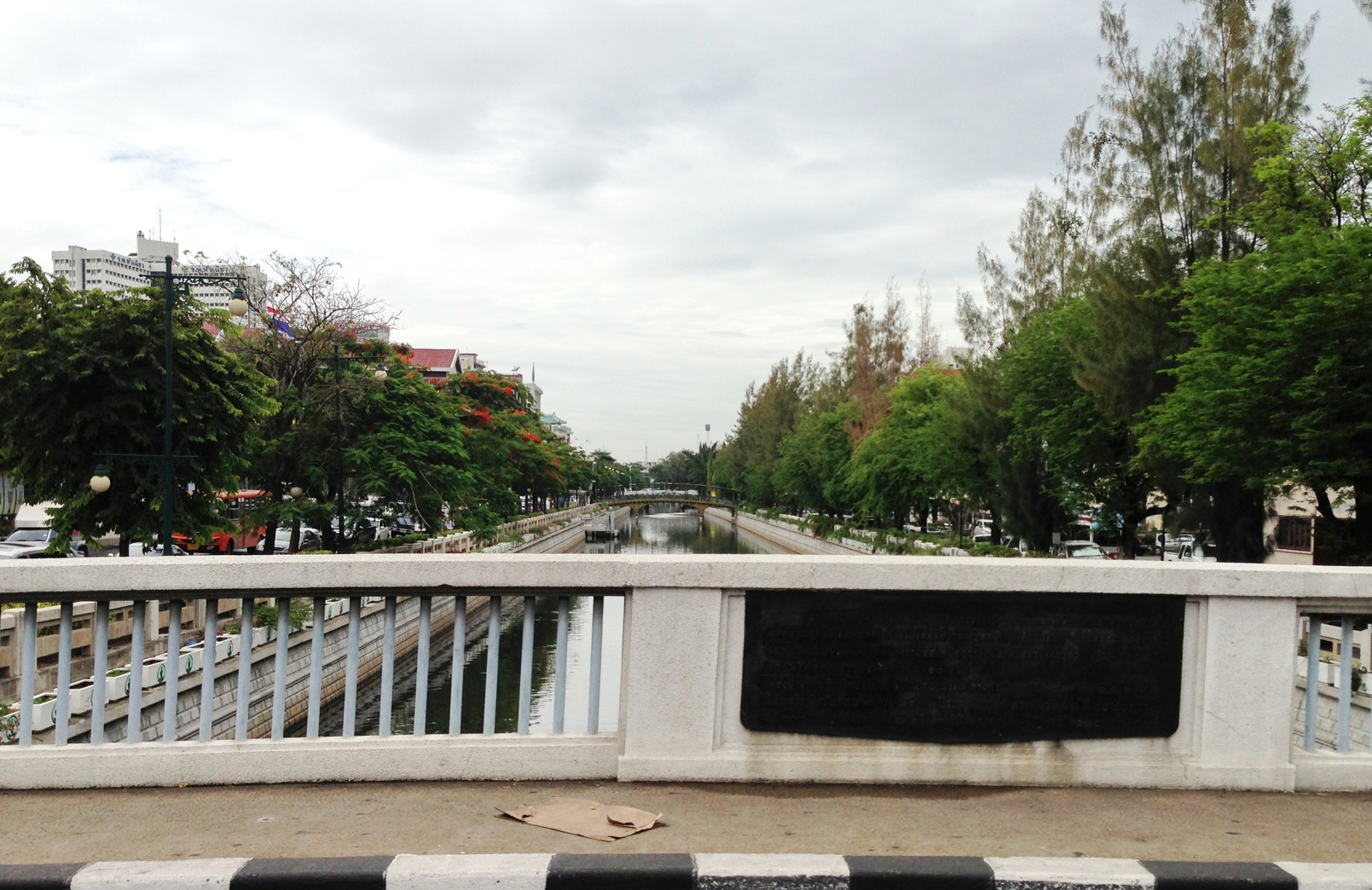
Nopphawong Bridge.

The second is Nopphawong Bridge, which King Chulalongkorn had built to be completed in time for his birthday in December 1897, when he would reach the same age as his half-brother, Prince Nopphawong. The bridge crosses Khlong Phadung Krung Kasem, at the former site of Prap Sattru Phai Fort, and has been renovated several times.

Today, Luang Road is a one-way street. Traffic flows northwest from Nopphawong Junction, where it meets Krung Kasem and Mittraphan Roads, towards Ruan Cham Junction. Notable landmarks along the route include Phlapphla Chai Intersection, Klang Hospital, and Wat Debsirin.
