= Wat Khanikaphon =

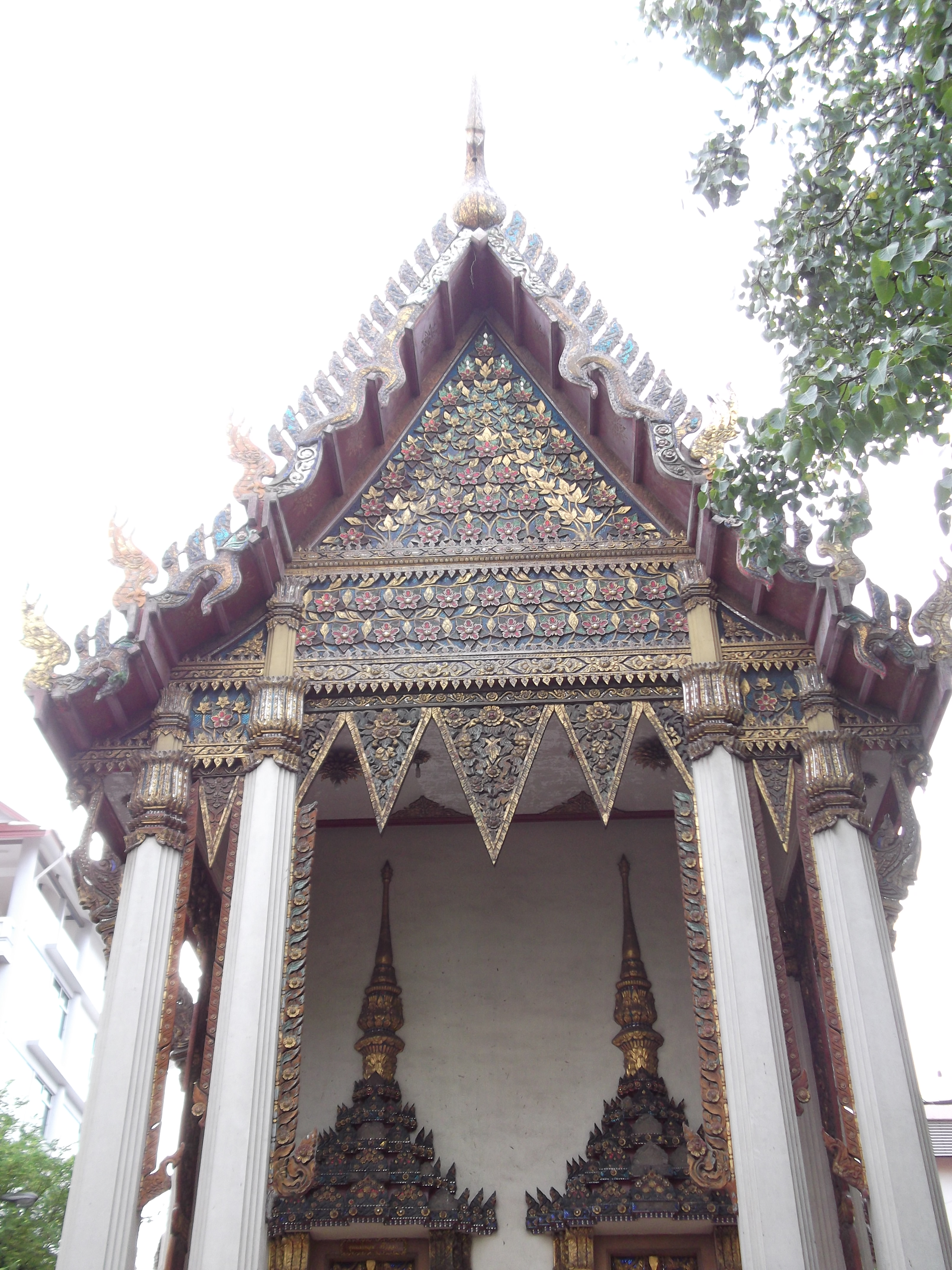
- Front of the chapel

- Location within Bangkok

Religion
- Affiliation: Buddhism
- Sect: Mahanikaya
- Status: Active

Location
- Location: Pom Prap Sattru Phai District, Bangkok
- Country: Thailand
- Interactive map of Wat Khanikaphon
- Coordinates: 13°44′39″N 100°30′36″E

Architecture
- Founder: Madam Faeng
- Completed: 1833

Wat Khanikaphon (Thai: วัดคณิกาผล) is a Thai private temple in the Maha Nikaya tradition of Buddhism, It is at Phlapphla Chai, Khwaeng Pom Prap, Pom Prap Sattru Phai District, Bangkok, in front of the Phlapphla Chai police station.

During the reign of King Nang Klao, a rich old woman named Faeng (แฟง)—Madam Faeng to the public—was a faithful Buddhist, despite being the owner of a brothel, called "Madam Faeng's Station", on Yaowarat Road. She raised funds from the prostitutes in her brothel to build the temple in 1833.

To celebrate the temple's opening, Madam Faeng invited Father To, a monk who later obtained the ecclesiastical title of Somdet Phra Phutthachan (To Phrommarangsi), to deliver a sermon, hoping that the monk would praise her contribution. Father To's address noted that the merits made for displaying one's own virtue, however great, would result in low goodness. The monk said that the monies gained from prostitution spent in building the temple were considered the "sinful money", and that, for one pound of contribution, Madam Faeng would gain only one shilling of merit.

Originally, there was no official name for the temple. The public called it "Madam Faeng's Temple" (วัดใหม่ยายแฟง, literally 'New Temple by Madam Faeng'). As from its establishment, the temple has been opened to the public and a site of public religious activities. When King Chulalongkorn ascended to the throne, Madam Faeng's descendants renovated the temple and petitioned the king for an official name. King Chulalongkorn named the temple Khanikaphon, from Pāḷi, Gaṇikābala, meaning 'the temple which was the result of the prostitutes' contributions'.

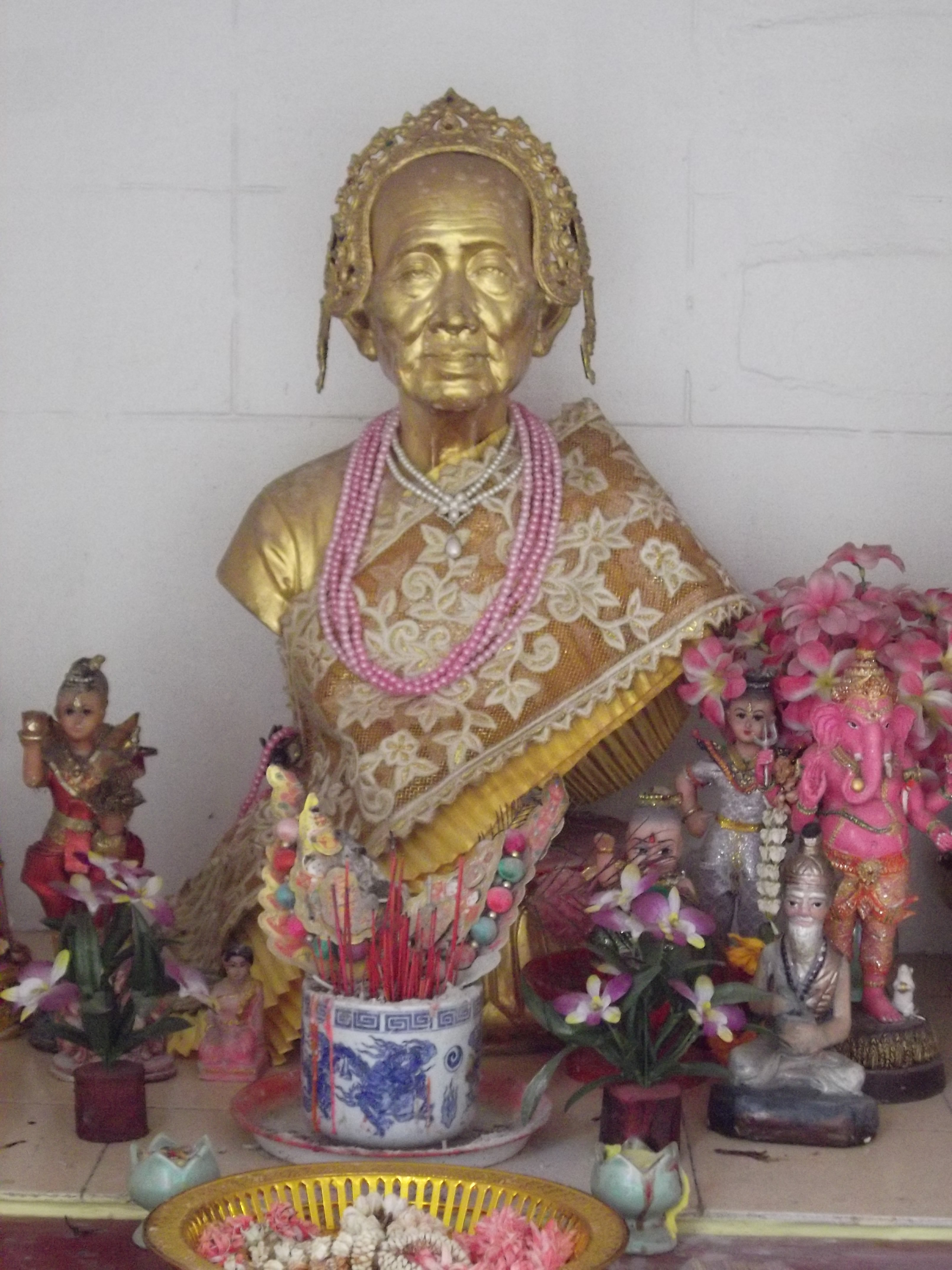
Bust of Madam Faeng

The temple retains many items existing since its establishment, including the presiding Buddha image, the central hall, the image halls, a small pagoda, the cloisters, the masonic bell tower, and the ancient file cabinet. There is a model of Father To in front of the temple, and a half figure of Madam Faeng covered with gold leaves placed inside the wall. On the base of the Madam Faeng figure, there is an inscription: "This Wat Khanikaphon was established in 1833 by Madam Faeng, ascendant of the Paorohit Family".

The temple runs a primary school called "Wat Khanikaphon School" under the auspices of the Bangkok Metropolitan Administration.
