= The Amazing Race Australia 8 =

Season of television series

- Season 8
- Presented by: Beau Ryan
- No. of teams: 11
- Winners: Tai "Bam Bam" & Logan Tuivasa
- No. of legs: 12
- Distance traveled: 25,000 km (16,000 mi)
- No. of episodes: 12

Release
- Original network: Network 10
- Original release: 9 September – 20 October 2024

Additional information
- Filming dates: 7 May – 1 June 2024

Series chronology
- ← Previous; Celebrity Edition Next → Celebrity Edition 3

The Amazing Race Australia 8, also known as The Amazing Race Australia: Celebrity Edition 2, is the eighth season of The Amazing Race Australia, an Australian reality competition show based on the American series The Amazing Race. The season is the fifth instalment of Network 10's iteration of the show and the second celebrity edition. Hosted by Beau Ryan, it features eleven teams of two, each with a pre-existing relationship and including at least one celebrity contestant, in a race across the world to win the grand prize of A$100,000 for the winners' chosen charity.

This season visited three continents and four countries and travelled over 25,000 kilometres (16,000 mi) during twelve legs. Starting in Buenos Aires, racers travelled through Argentina, South Africa, Namibia and Thailand before finishing in Bangkok. The season premiered on 9 September 2024 and concluded on 20 October 2024.

MMA fighter Tai "Bam Bam" and his brother Logan Tuivasa were the winners of this season, while AFL player Billy Brownless and his son Oscar finished in second place and married country singers Brooke McClymont and Adam Eckersley finished in third place.

== Production ==
=== Development and filming ===
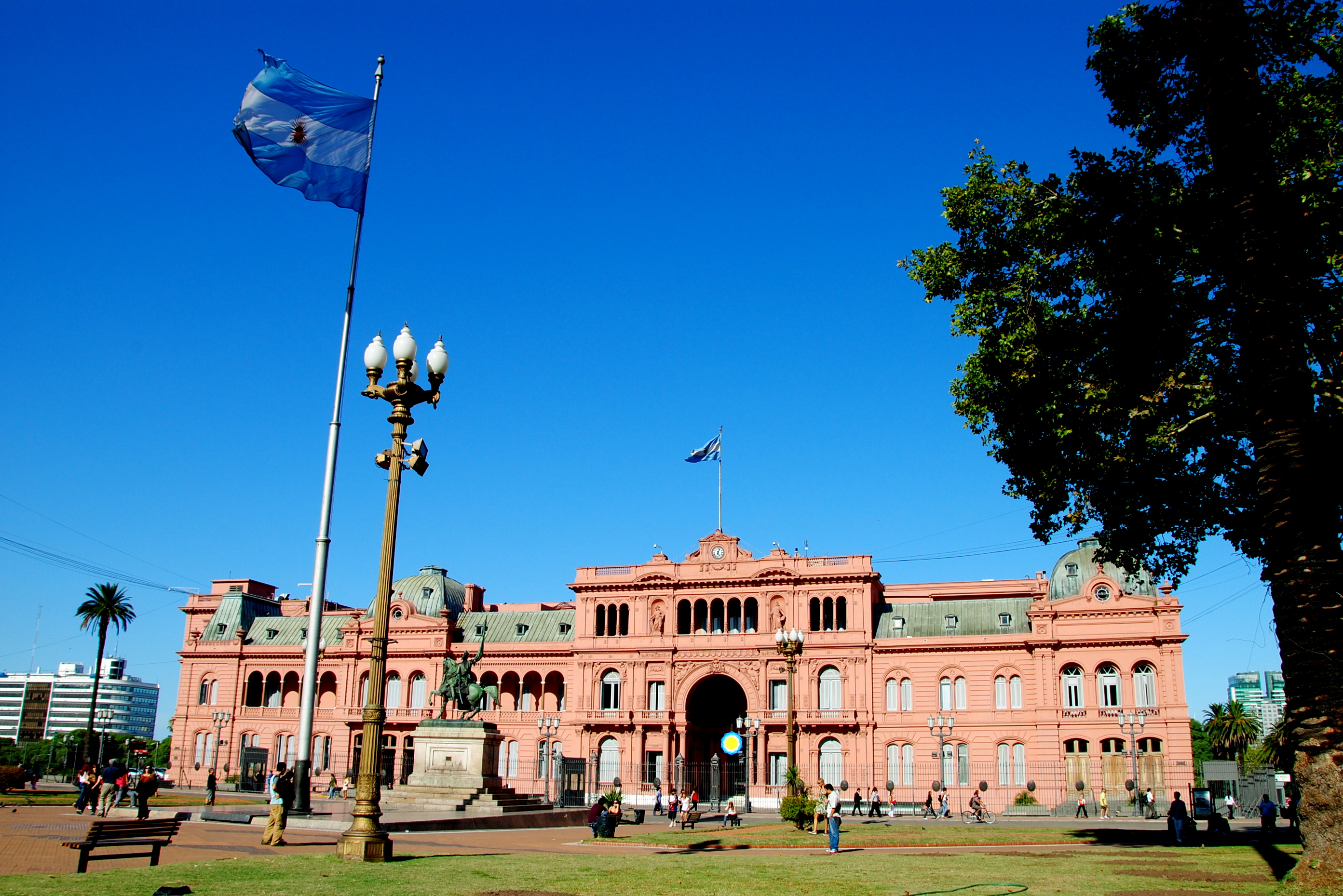
The second celebrity season of The Amazing Race Australia began outside Casa Rosada in Buenos Aires, Argentina.

On 24 October 2023, The Amazing Race Australia was renewed for a second celebrity season. In January 2024, Daniel Monaghan, SVP Content and Programming, said that the route for this season would be going "a bit further" compared to the previous season. During the launch event for Top Gear Australia in early May 2024, Ryan stated that filming would start "relatively soon".

Filming for this season began on 7 May 2024 in Buenos Aires, Argentina. In an interview after filming began, Monaghan announced that this season would travel to multiple continents, after the previous season only visited Asia, in an anti-clockwise direction. Later in the month, the show visited Spitzkoppe, Swakopmund and Walvis Bay, Namibia. In September, it was revealed that the season visited the continents of South America, Africa and Asia and the countries of Argentina, South Africa, Namibia and Thailand.

=== Casting ===
Former NRL player Matthew Johns was rumoured to have been set to compete with his son Cooper; however, they dropped out at the last minute.

== Release ==
=== Broadcast ===
At upfronts in 2023, Network 10 announced that the season would air in the second half of 2024. On 16 May, Monaghan stated that the season would air after the third season of Hunted. On 20 August 2024, Network 10 announced that the season was scheduled to premiere on 9 September.

== Cast ==
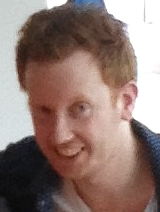
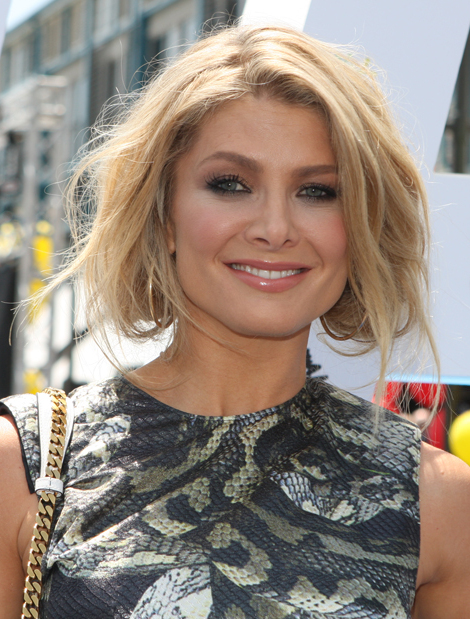
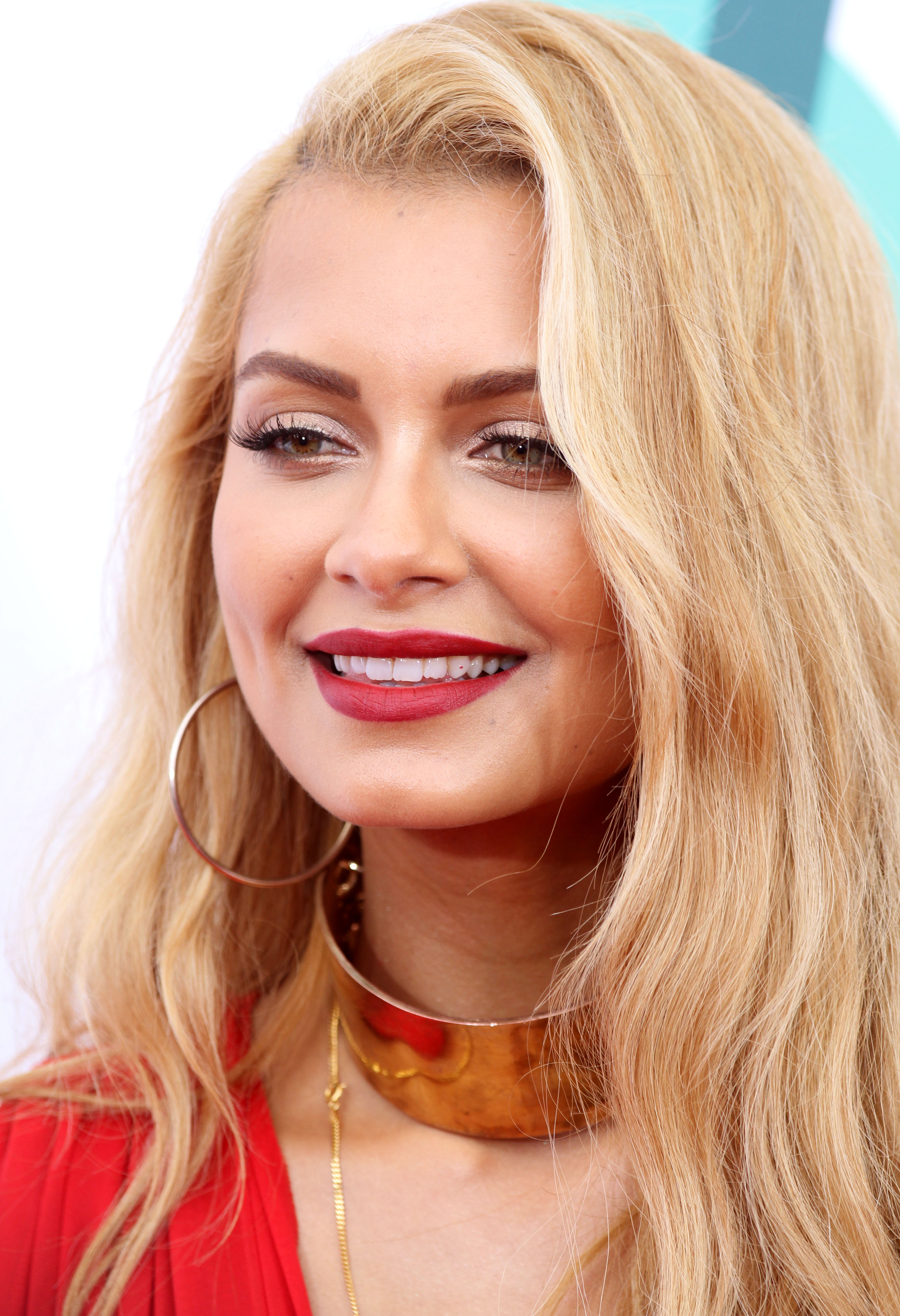
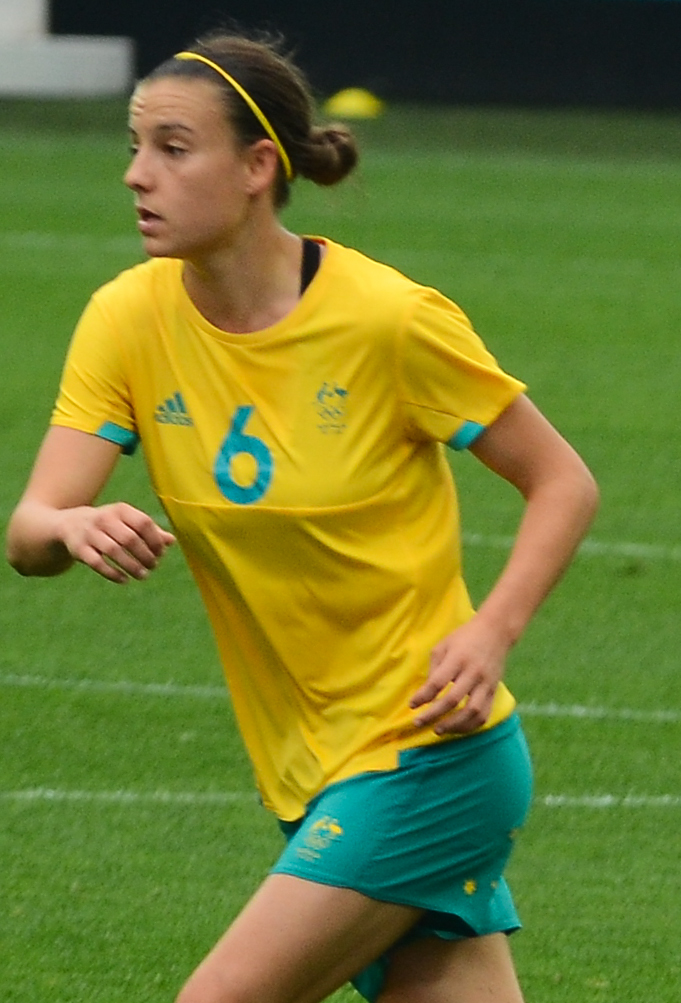
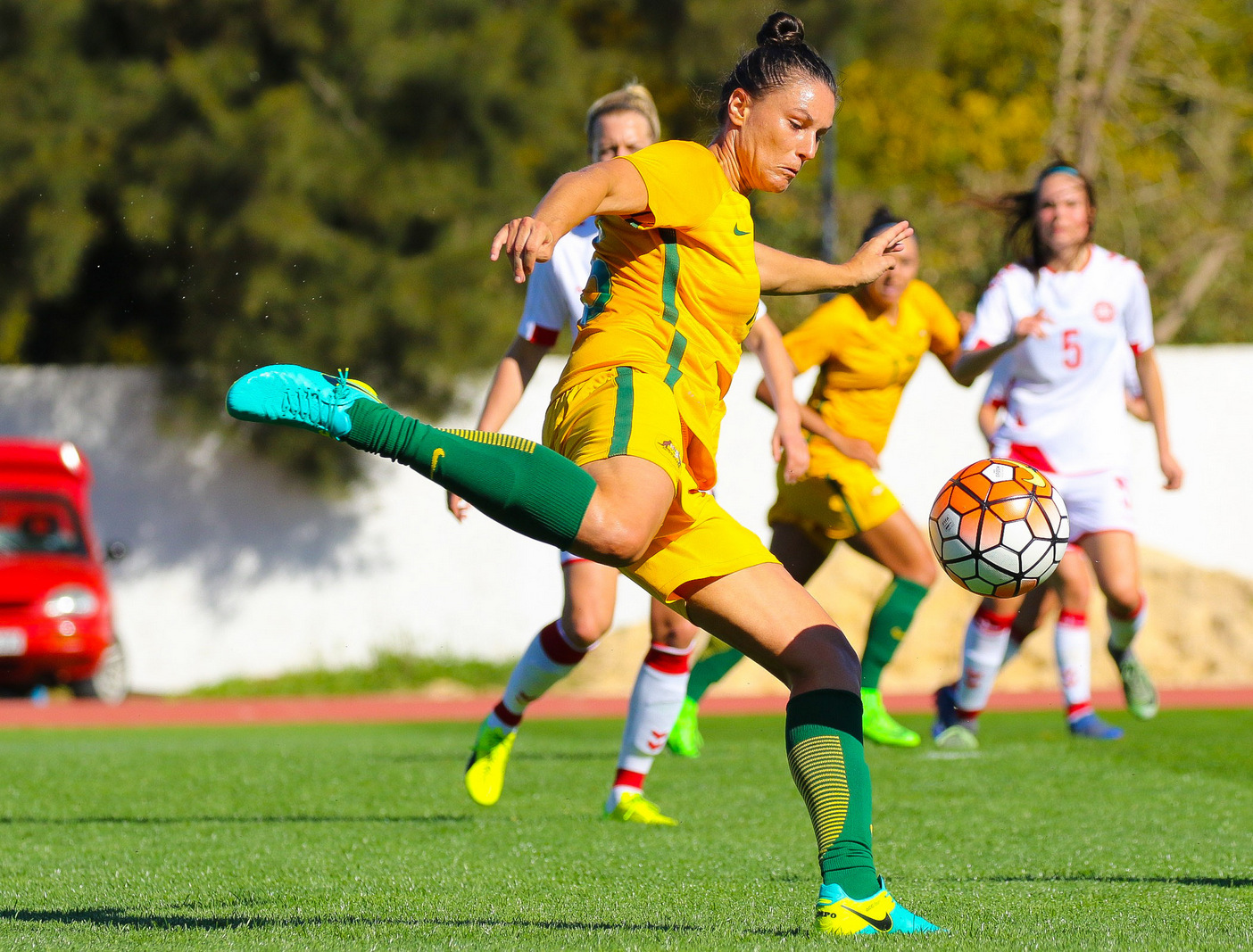
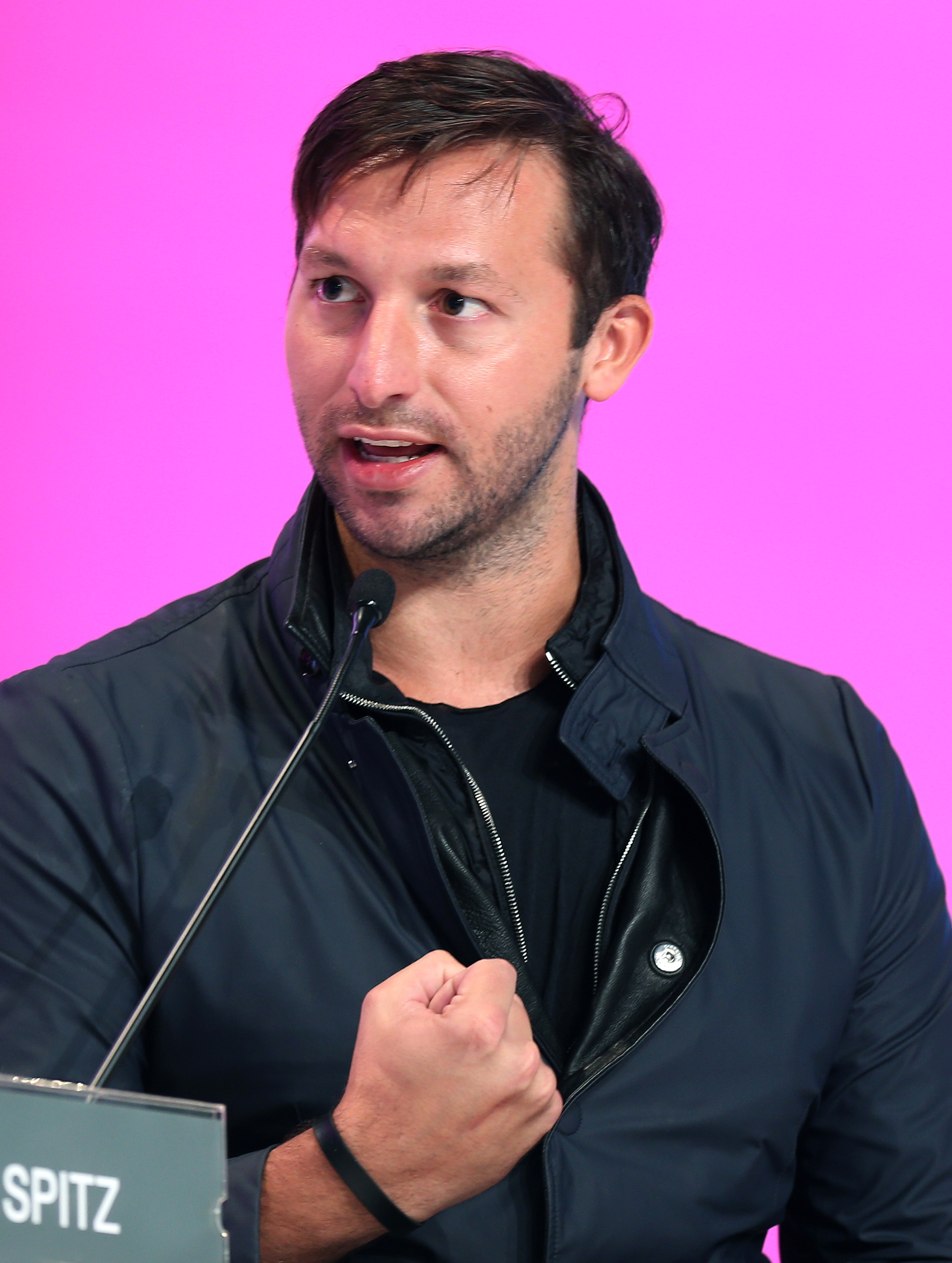
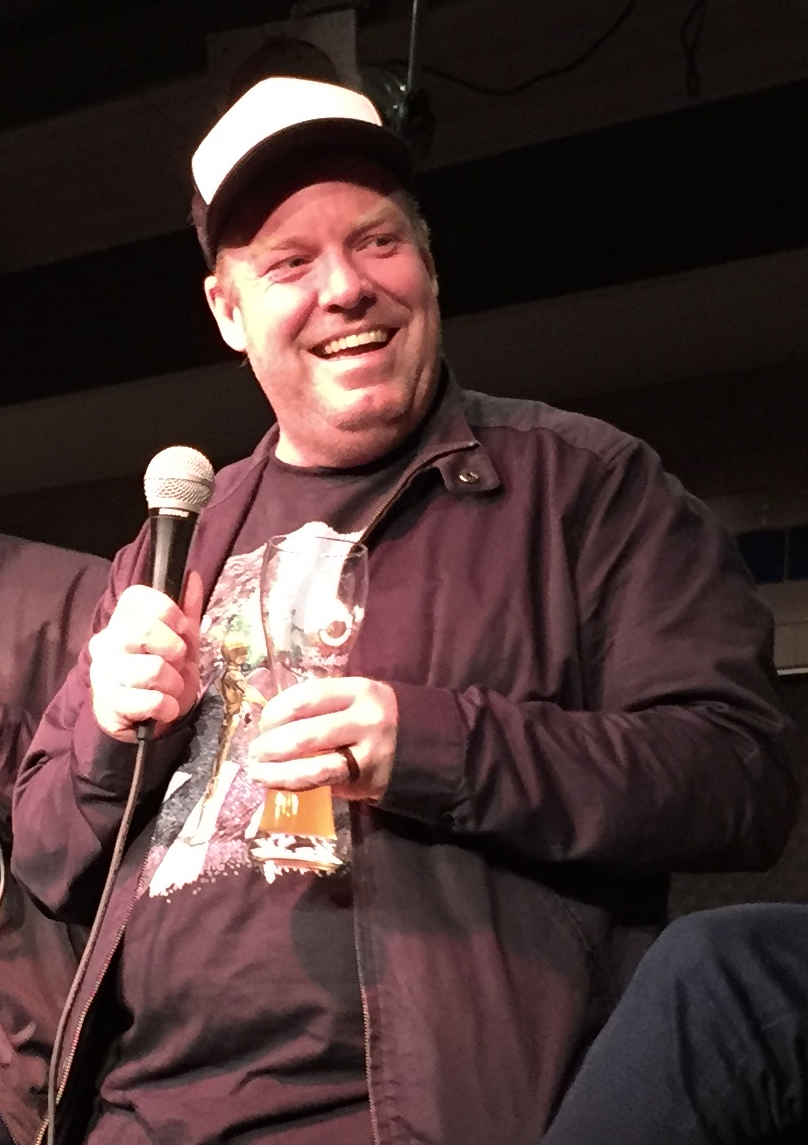
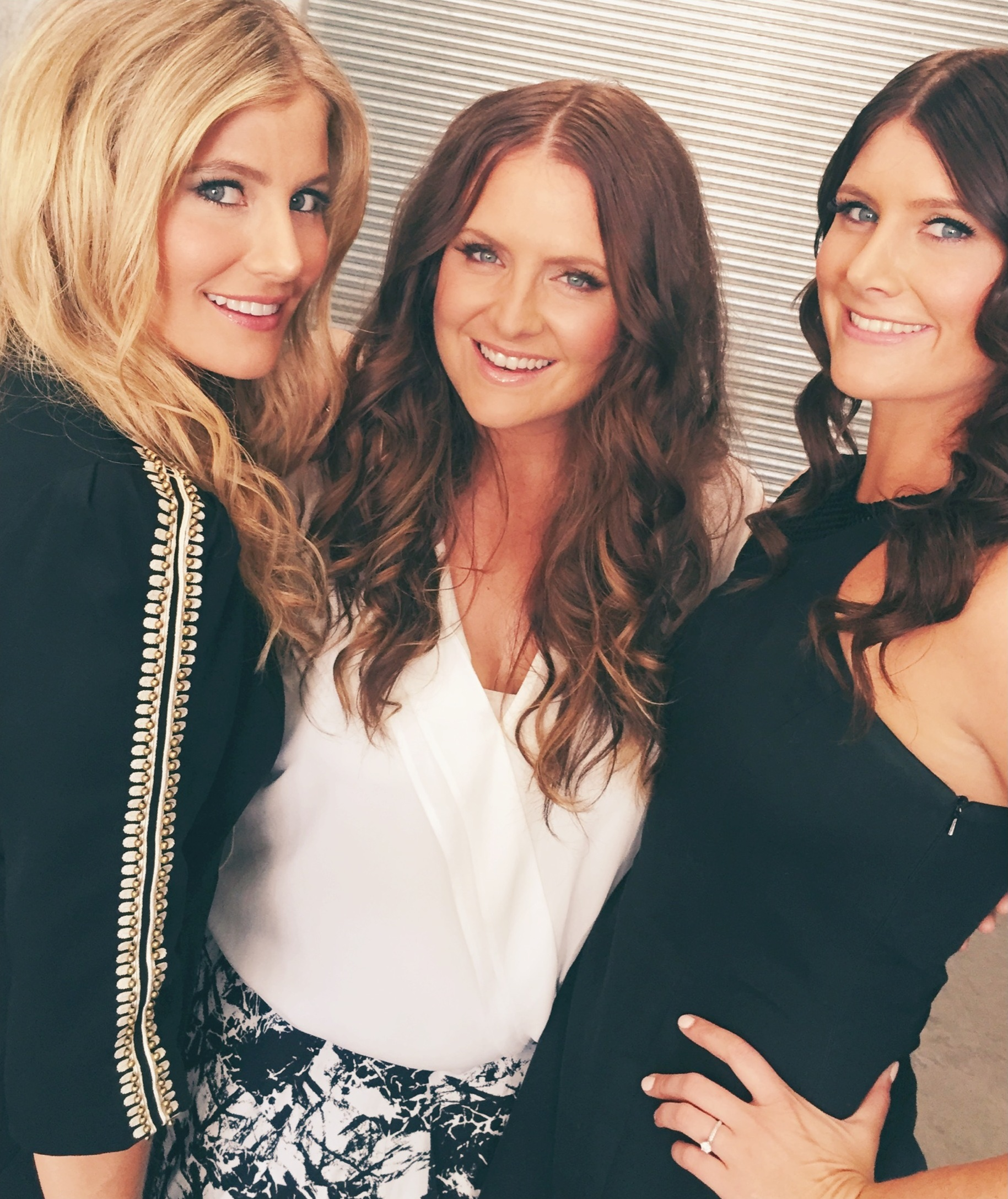
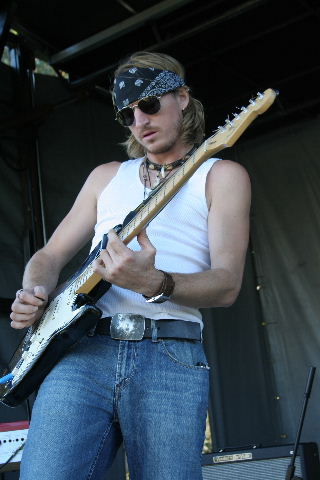
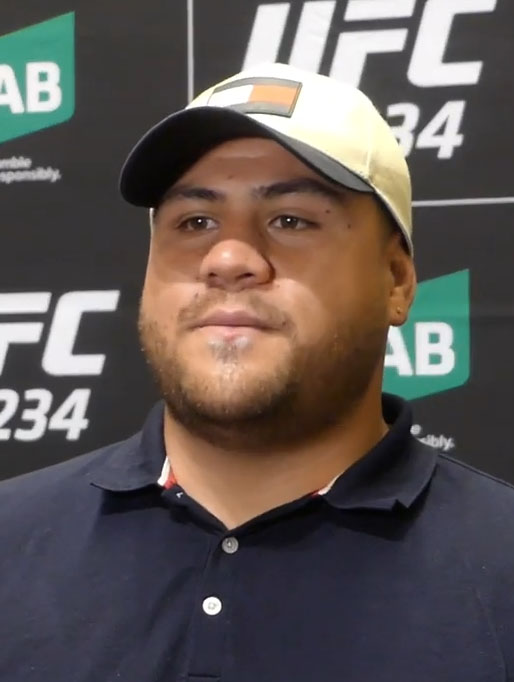
From left to right: Luke McGregor, Natalie "Nat" Bassingthwaighte, Havana Brown, Chloe Logarzo, Emily Gielnik, Ian "Thorpie" Thorpe, Peter "Pete" Helliar, Brooke McClymont, Adam Eckersley and Tai "Bam Bam" Tuivasa

The cast consists of celebrities and their relatives and friends.

Contestants	Notability	Age	Relationship	Charity	Status
Luke McGregor	Comedian	41	Son & Mum	Mudgin-Gal Women's Centre	Eliminated 1st (in Buenos Aires, Argentina)
Julie McGregor	—N/a	63	Son & Mum	Mudgin-Gal Women's Centre	Eliminated 1st (in Buenos Aires, Argentina)
Natalie "Nat" Bassingthwaighte	Singer & actress	48	Sisters	Black Dog Institute	Eliminated 2nd (in La Caldera, Argentina)
Mel Sheldrick	—N/a	50	Sisters	Black Dog Institute	Eliminated 2nd (in La Caldera, Argentina)
Cyrell Paule	Married at First Sight 6 contestant	35	Engaged	Bravehearts	Eliminated 3rd (in Tilcara, Argentina)
Eden Dally	Love Island 1 contestant	31	Engaged	Bravehearts	Eliminated 3rd (in Tilcara, Argentina)
Jett Kenny	Model	30	Dating	endED	Eliminated 4th (in Johannesburg, South Africa)
Lily Brown	Influencer	26	Dating	endED	Eliminated 4th (in Johannesburg, South Africa)
Havana Brown	DJ	39	Besties	The Salvation Army's 614	Eliminated 5th (in Krugersdorp, South Africa)
Steph Dunstan-Wood	—N/a	38	Besties	The Salvation Army's 614	Eliminated 5th (in Krugersdorp, South Africa)
Chloe Logarzo	Professional soccer player	29	Matildas Teammates	National Breast Cancer Foundation	Eliminated 6th (in Dorob National Park, Namibia)
Emily Gielnik	Professional soccer player	32	Matildas Teammates	National Breast Cancer Foundation	Eliminated 6th (in Dorob National Park, Namibia)
Ian "Thorpie" Thorpe	Olympic swimmer	41	Mates	Reachout Australia	Eliminated 7th (in Usakos, Namibia)
Christian Miranda	—N/a	38	Mates	Reachout Australia	Eliminated 7th (in Usakos, Namibia)
Pete Helliar	Comedian	48	Married	Cure EB Foundation	Eliminated 8th (in Phuket, Thailand)
Bridget Helliar	—N/a	44	Married	Cure EB Foundation	Eliminated 8th (in Phuket, Thailand)
Brooke McClymont	Singer	43	Married Country Singers	Rural Aid	Third place
Adam Eckersley	Singer	42	Married Country Singers	Rural Aid	Third place
Billy Brownless	Australian Football League player	57	Dad & Son	Read The Play	Runners-up
Oscar Brownless	—N/a	24	Dad & Son	Read The Play	Runners-up
Tai "Bam Bam" Tuivasa	Mixed martial artist	31	Brothers	Sydney Region Aboriginal Corporation	Winners
Logan Tuivasa	—N/a	35	Brothers	Sydney Region Aboriginal Corporation	Winners

Future appearances

Cyrell Paule competed on the twelfth season of I'm a Celebrity...Get Me Out of Here! in 2026.

== Results ==
The following teams are listed with their placements in each leg. Placements are listed in finishing order.

- A red placement with a dagger (†) indicates that the team was eliminated.
- An underlined blue placement with a double-dagger (‡) indicates that the team was the last to arrive at a Pit Stop in a non-elimination leg and had to perform a Speed Bump task in the following leg.
- An italicized and underlined placement indicates that the team was the last to arrive at a Virtual Pit Stop, and had to perform a Speed Bump task in the following leg. There was no rest period at this Virtual Pit Stop with all teams instructed to continue racing.
- A violet + indicates that the teams encountered an Intersection.

Team placement (by leg)
Team	1	2+ (Note: This leg featured an Intersection. The teams were paired up thusly: Bam Bam & Logan and Jett & Lily, Chloe & Emily and Thorpie & Christian, Brooke & Adam and Billy & Oscar, Havana & Steph and Pete & Bridget, Cyrell & Eden and Nat & Mel.)	3	4	5	6	7 (Note: Leg 7 was an Elimination Virtual Pit Stop. While the last placing team was eliminated, all remaining teams were instructed to continue racing.)	8	9	10	11	12
Bam Bam & Logan	9th	1st	2nd	1st	2nd	4th	1st	3rd	3rd	2nd	2nd	1st
Billy & Oscar	6th	2nd	8th	7th	6th	3rd	4th	4th	4th (Note: Billy & Oscar initially arrived 3rd at the Pit Stop; however, they were issued a 40-minute penalty for not completing the bokdrol spoeg task. Bam Bam & Logan checked in during this penalty time, dropping Billy & Oscar to 4th.)	4th‡	3rd	2nd
Brooke & Adam	4th	3rd	6th	4th	1st	1st	2nd	2nd	1st	3rd	1st	3rd
Pete & Bridget	8th	7th	5th	6th	7th (Note: Pete & Bridget initially arrived 4th at the Pit Stop; however, they were issued a 30-minute penalty for not completing the Roadblock. All other teams checked in during this penalty time, dropping Pete & Bridget to last.)	6th	3rd	1st	2nd	1st	4th†	
Thorpie & Christian	2nd	4th	7th	5th	5th	5th	5th	5th‡	5th†			
Chloe & Emily	1st	5th	1st	3rd	4th	2nd	6th†					
Havana & Steph	5th	6th	3rd	2nd	3rd	7th†						
Jett & Lily	3rd	8th (Note: Jett & Lily initially arrived 1st at the Pit Stop; however, they were issued a 1-hour penalty for not completing the Detour. Seven other teams checked in during this penalty time, dropping Jett & Lily to 8th.)	4th	8th†								
Cyrell & Eden	10th	9th	9th†									
Nat & Mel	7th	10th†										
Luke & Julie	11th† (Note: Luke & Julie initially arrived 8th at the Pit Stop; however, they were issued a 30-minute penalty for not completing the Detour. All other teams checked in during this penalty time, dropping Luke & Julie to last.)											

== Race summary ==
Destinations	Air travel Rail travel Water travel Bus travel Helicopter travel Bicycle travel Gondola travel
Route Markers	Detour Roadblock Speed Bump Intersection Pit Stop

=== Leg 1 (Argentina) ===
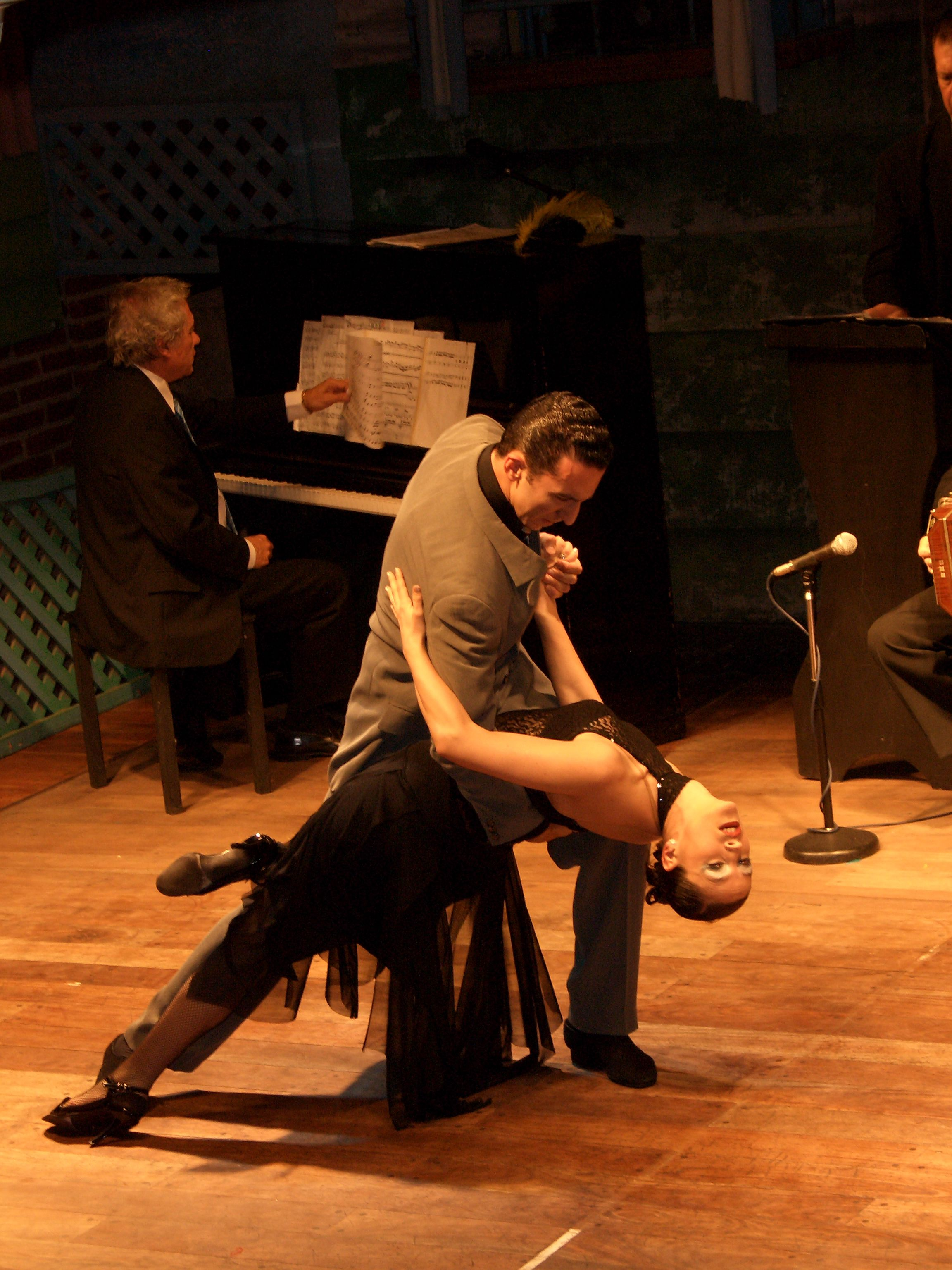
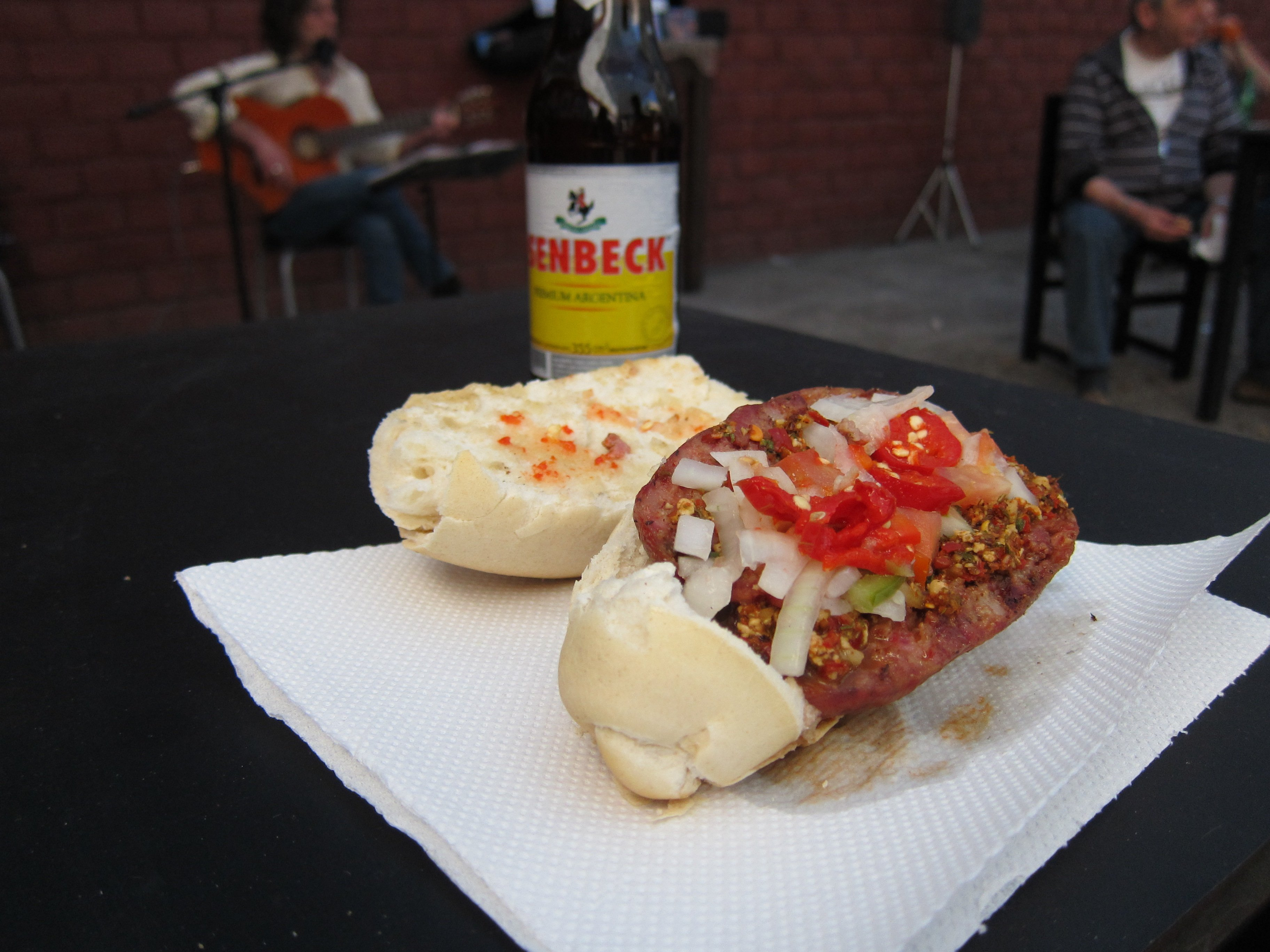
For their first Detour, the celebrities either had to dance a tango or make choripán.
- Episode 1 (9 September 2024)
- Prize: A stay at a hotel suite during the Pit Stop (awarded to Chloe & Emily)
- Eliminated: Luke & Julie

Locations

- Buenos Aires, Argentina (Plaza de Mayo – Casa Rosada) (Starting Line)
- Buenos Aires (Obelisco de Buenos Aires)
- Buenos Aires (Plaza Intendente Alvear – Gomero de la Recoleta)
- Buenos Aires (Casal de Catalunya or Plaza Dorrego)
- Buenos Aires (La Boca – Caminito)
- Buenos Aires (Silos Puerto Madero)
- Buenos Aires (Centro Cultural Kirchner)

Episode summary

- Teams set off from Plaza de Mayo and had to travel by taxi from Obelisco de Buenos Aires to Gomero de la Recoleta, where they had to find a statue of Atlas with their next clue. There, teams had to find four paseadores de perros – dog walkers – and count their dogs (35) before receiving their next clue.
- This season's first Detour was a choice between National Dance or National Sandwich. In National Dance, teams had to make their way to the theatre inside Casal de Catalunya and perform an Argentine tango to the satisfaction of a judge before receiving their next clue. In National Sandwich, teams had to cook 24 choripánes, consisting of chorizo, chimichurri, salsa and bread, in Plaza Dorrego before receiving their next clue.
- After the Detour, teams had to travel by taxi to the neighbourhood of La Boca. Once there, they had to recite a football chant for the Boca Juniors football club to the satisfaction of a judge before receiving their next clue. Teams then had to travel by taxi to Silos Puerto Madero before travelling by foot to the Pit Stop: the Centro Cultural Kirchner.

Additional note

- Freestyle football star Bárbara Roskin appeared as the Pit Stop greeter for this leg.

=== Leg 2 (Argentina) ===
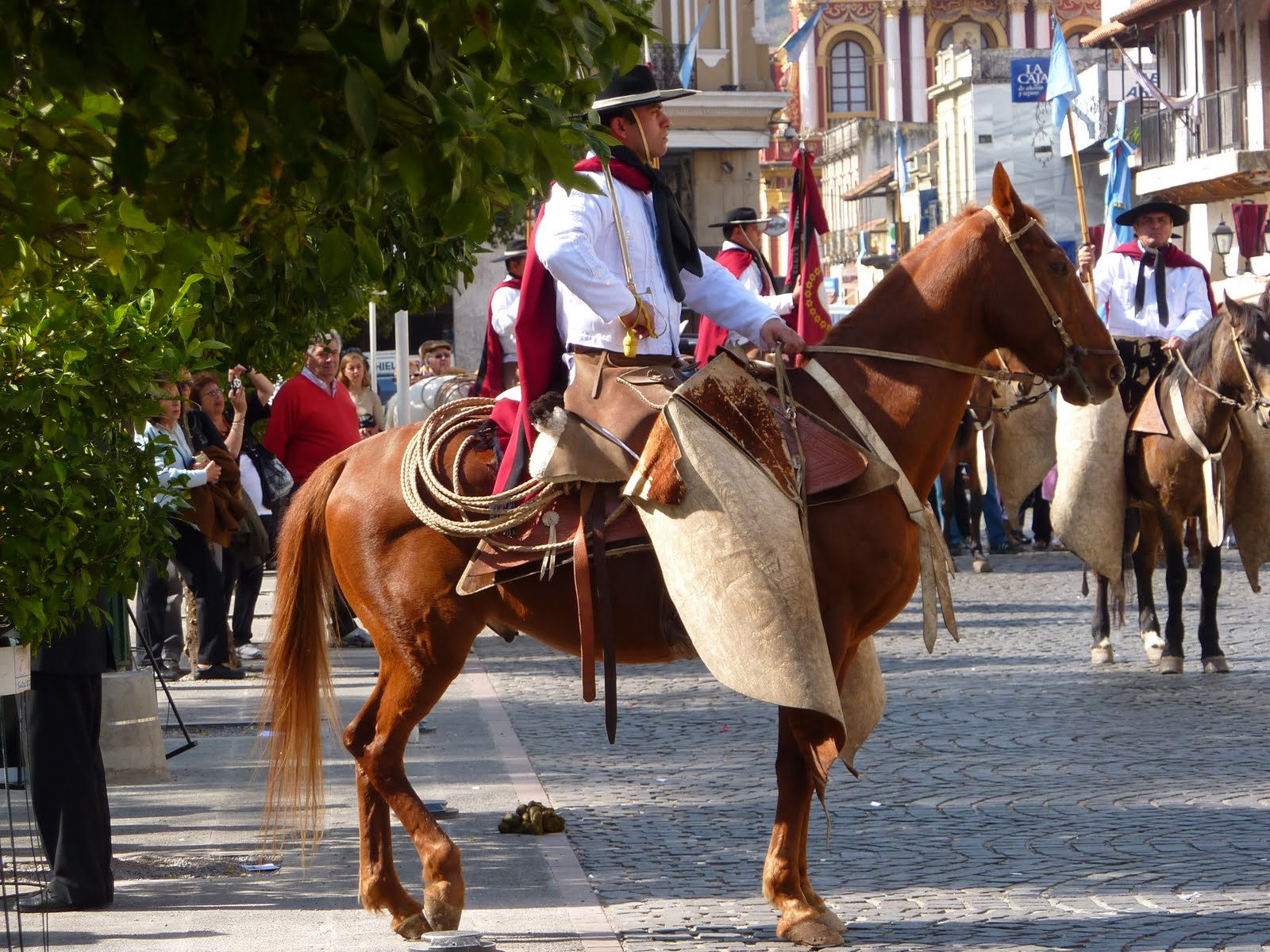
The Intersection in Salta focused on the gaucho culture of the Argentine Northwest.

- Episode 2 (10 September 2024)
- Eliminated: Nat & Mel

Locations

- Buenos Aires (Retiro Bus Station) → Salta (Terminal de Ómnibus de Salta)
- Salta (Cerro San Bernardo)
- Salta (Parque San Martin)
- Salta (Monument General Martin Miguel de Guemes)
- Vaqueros (Finca La Huella)
- San Lorenzo (Finca Lesser)
- La Caldera (Dique Campo Alegre)

Episode summary

- During the Pit Stop, teams travelled to Salta. Once there, teams had to travel by taxi to the top of Cerro San Bernardo and find their next clue. Teams then had to take the cable car down Cerro San Bernardo to Parque San Martín in order to reach the Roadblock.
- In this season's first Roadblock, one team member had to search amongst Carnival dancers at Monument General Martin Miguel de Guemes for one with a pattern that matched a provided swatch. Racers then had to memorise a medallion worn by the dancer and pick out the correct one from a table before receiving their next clue.
- This leg's Detour was a choice between Strong Stomach or Soft Touch. For both Detour tasks, teams first had to drive to Finca La Huella. In Strong Stomach, teams had to eat a cabeza guateada – roasted cow head – before receiving their next clue. In Soft Touch, teams had to extract two kilograms of goat milk before receiving their next clue.
- After the Detour, teams had to drive to Finca Lesser, where they encountered this season's only Intersection. Two teams had to join up and perform a gaucho horseback riding routine before receiving their next clue, which directed teams to the Pit Stop: Dique Campo Alegre in La Caldera. The teams intersected as follows: Bam Bam & Logan and Jett & Lily, Chloe & Emily and Thorpie & Christian, Brooke & Adam and Billy & Oscar, Havana & Steph and Pete & Bridget, Cyrell & Eden and Nat & Mel.

=== Leg 3 (Argentina) ===
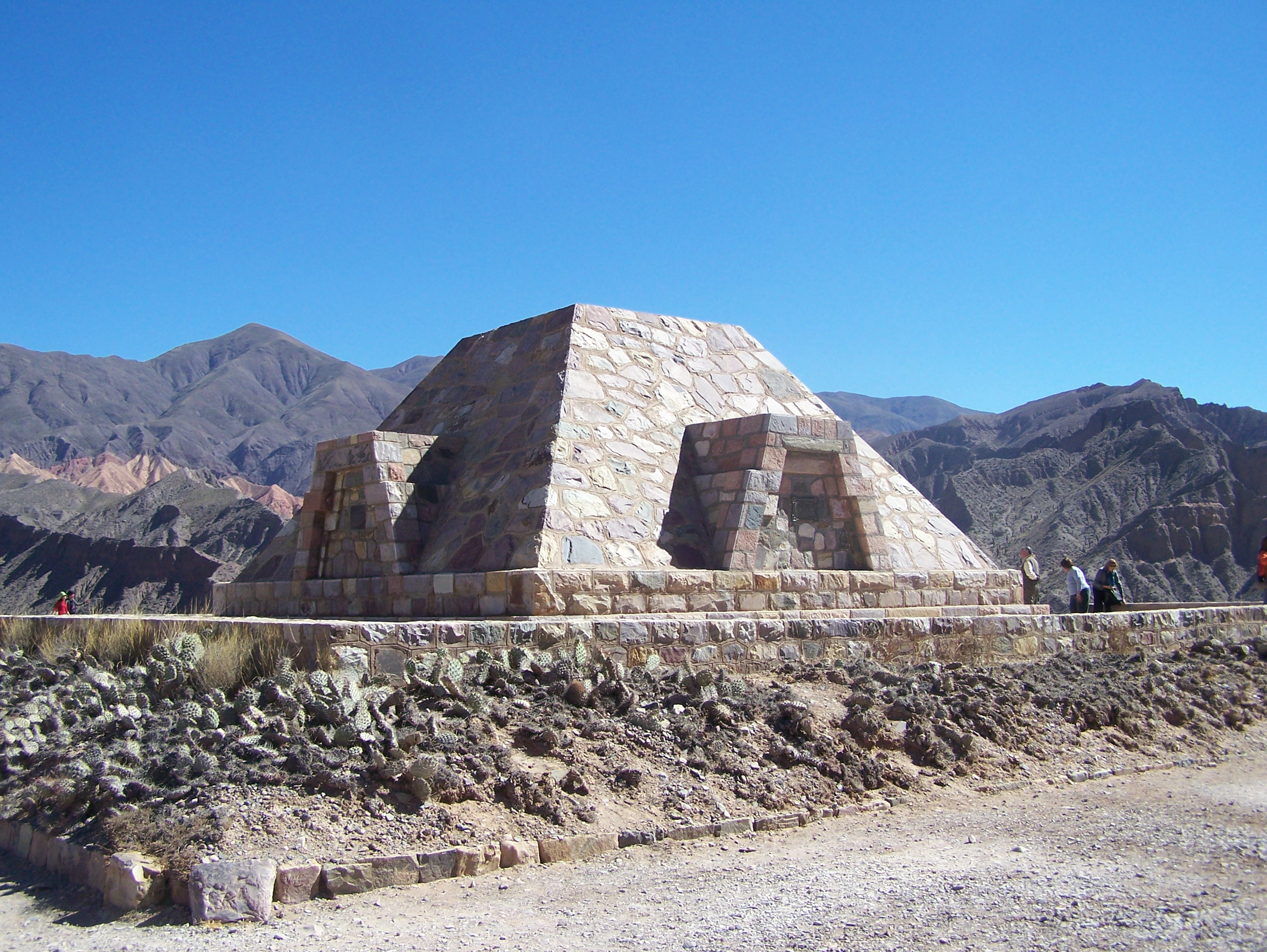
The Incan themed leg in Jujuy Province concluded at Pucará de Tilcara.

- Episode 3 (15 September 2024)
- Prize: A stay at a hotel suite during the Pit Stop (awarded to Chloe & Emily)
- Eliminated: Cyrell & Eden

Locations

- Purmamarca (Ruta Nacional 9)
- Purmamarca (Estacionamiento Municipal)
- Purmamarca (Paseo de los Colorados or Iglesia Santa Rosa de Lima)
- Tilcara (Caravana de Llamas)
- Tilcara (Hostal La Casa Del Puente)
- Tilcara (Pucará de Tilcara)

Episode summary

- During the Pit Stop, teams travelled from Salta to Purmamarca. Once there, teams were instructed to drive to the Fábrica de Ladrillos inside Estacionamiento Municipal and mould 18 adobe bricks before receiving their next clue.
- This leg's Detour was a choice between Walk Like An Incan or Dress Like An Incan. In Walk Like An Incan, teams had to load provisions into traditional Incan blankets known as aguayos, carry them on their backs down the mountain trail in Paseo de los Colorados and deliver them to a nearby shop before receiving their next clue. In Dress Like An Incan, teams had to find the town market outside of Iglesia Santa Rosa de Lima and tie items onto an ekeko statue so that it matched an example before receiving their next clue.
- In this leg's Roadblock, one team member had to dress a llama from the Caravana de Llamas in Tilcara and then lead it on a walk through a valley before receiving their next clue.
- After the Roadblock, teams had to drive to Hostal La Casa Del Puente and then travel by foot to the Pit Stop: Pucará de Tilcara.

=== Leg 4 (Argentina → South Africa) ===
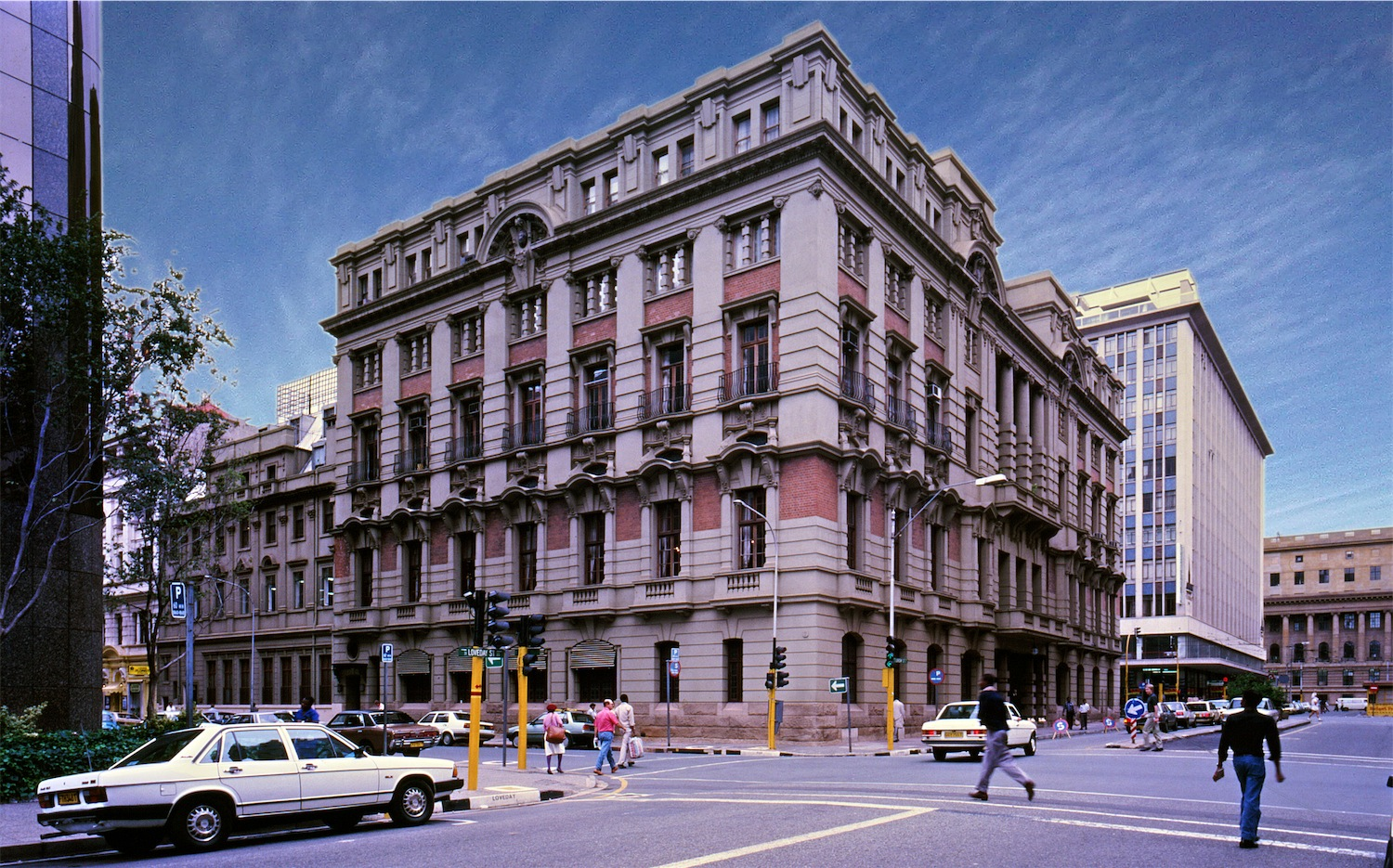
While in Johannesburg, racers had to search the Rand Club for their next clue.

- Episode 4 (16 September 2024)
- Eliminated: Jett & Lily

Locations

- Buenos Aires (Aeroparque Jorge Newbery) → Johannesburg, South Africa (O. R. Tambo International Airport)
- Sandton (Sandton Station)
- Sandton (Sandton Station) → Johannesburg (Johannesburg Park Station)
- Johannesburg (Kwa Mai Mai Traditional Market or London House)
- Johannesburg (Diagonal Street)
- Johannesburg (Rand Club)
- Johannesburg (Hallmark House)

Episode summary

- During the Pit Stop, teams flew to Johannesburg, South Africa. After departing from Sandton Station, teams were instructed to travel by train to Johannesburg Park Station and find their next clue.
- This leg's Detour was a choice between Healer or Styler. In Healer, teams had to travel to the Kwa Mai Mai Traditional Market and set up a nganga stall by placing items next to the correct Zulu language labels before receiving their next clue. In Styler, teams had to find London House in Johannesburg's fashion district. Once there, one team member had to use a sewing machine to sew a garment called a dashiki while the other team member had to sew a matching tote bag by hand before receiving their next clue.
- In this leg's Roadblock, one team member had to eat a popular street food dish called walkie talkies – grilled chicken heads and feet – at Diagonal Street before receiving their next clue.
- After the Roadblock, teams had to travel by foot to the Rand Club and search the club for representations of the Big five game until they found an African buffalo statue with their next clue, which directed them to the Pit Stop: Hallmark House.

=== Leg 5 (South Africa) ===
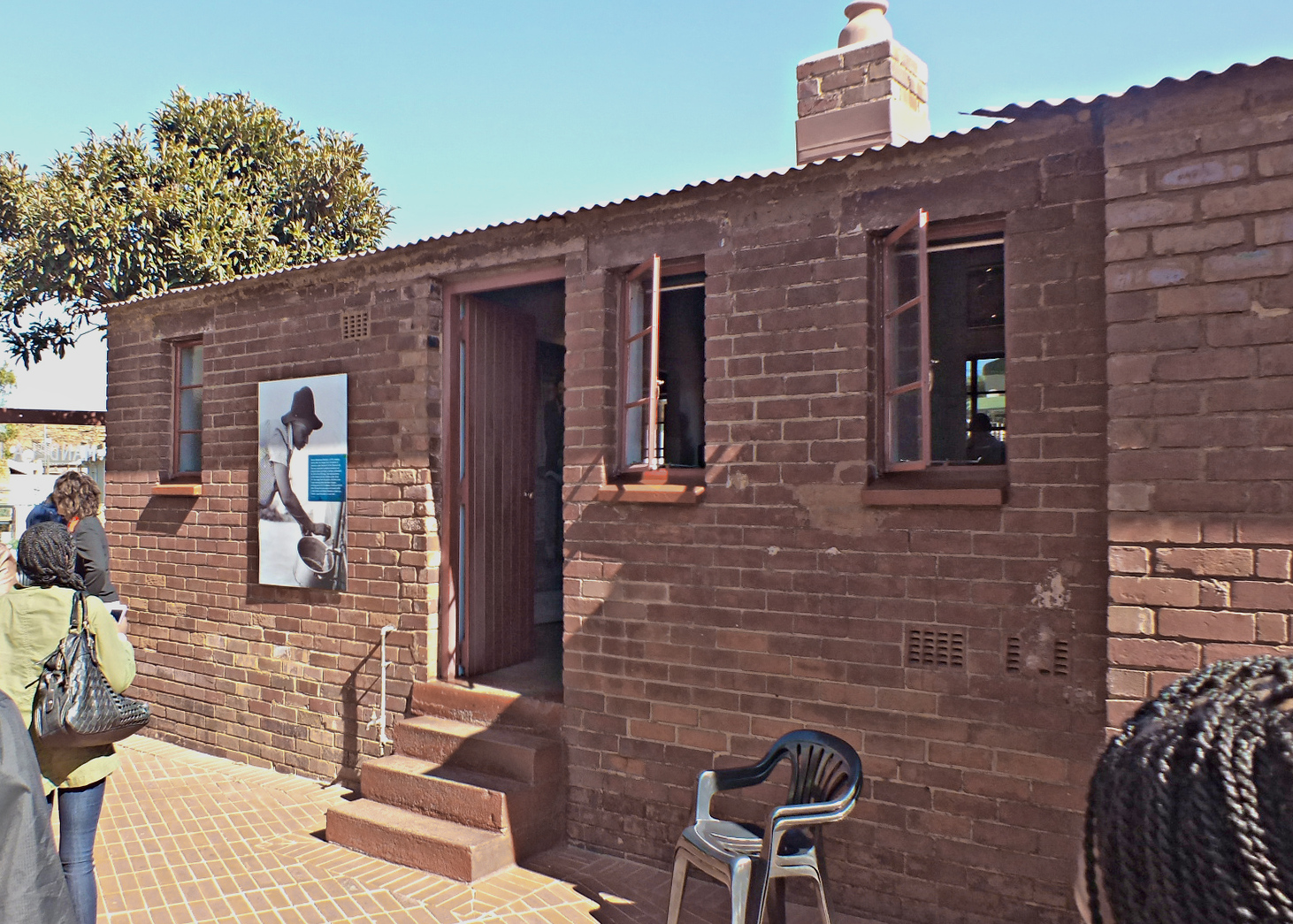
Teams visited the home of Nelson Mandela during their time in Soweto.

- Episode 5 (22 September 2024)

Locations

- Sandton (The Catalyst)
- Soweto (Lebo's Backpackers)
- Soweto (Mandela House)
- Soweto (Umbuyisa School of Arts and Culture)
- Soweto (Onions&All Take-Away Restaurant or Emaplazini/Polar's Place & 6362 Mashane Street)
- Soweto (Soweto Theatre)

Episode summary

- Teams received their first clue at the Pit Stop hotel and were instructed to travel to Lebo's Backpackers in Soweto, which had their next clue.
- In this leg's Roadblock, one team member had to assemble a bicycle before receiving their next clue.
- After the Roadblock, teams had to travel by bicycle to the Mandela House and find their next clue. Teams then had to travel by foot to the Umbuyisa School of Arts and Culture, where they had to perform a song and drum routine with the schoolchildren before receiving their next clue.
- This leg's Detour was a choice between Burgers or Beers. In Burgers, teams had to memorise kota burger orders from six patrons at the Onions&All Take-Away Restaurant and then prepare and serve the burgers before receiving their next clue. In Beers, teams had to travel to a shebeen and transport 30 litres of homebrewed Umqombothi beer two kilometers by wheelbarrow to a backyard party before receiving their next clue.
- After the Detour, teams had to check in at the Pit Stop: the Soweto Theatre.

Additional note

- There was no elimination at the end of this leg; all teams were instead instructed to continue racing.

=== Leg 6 (South Africa) ===
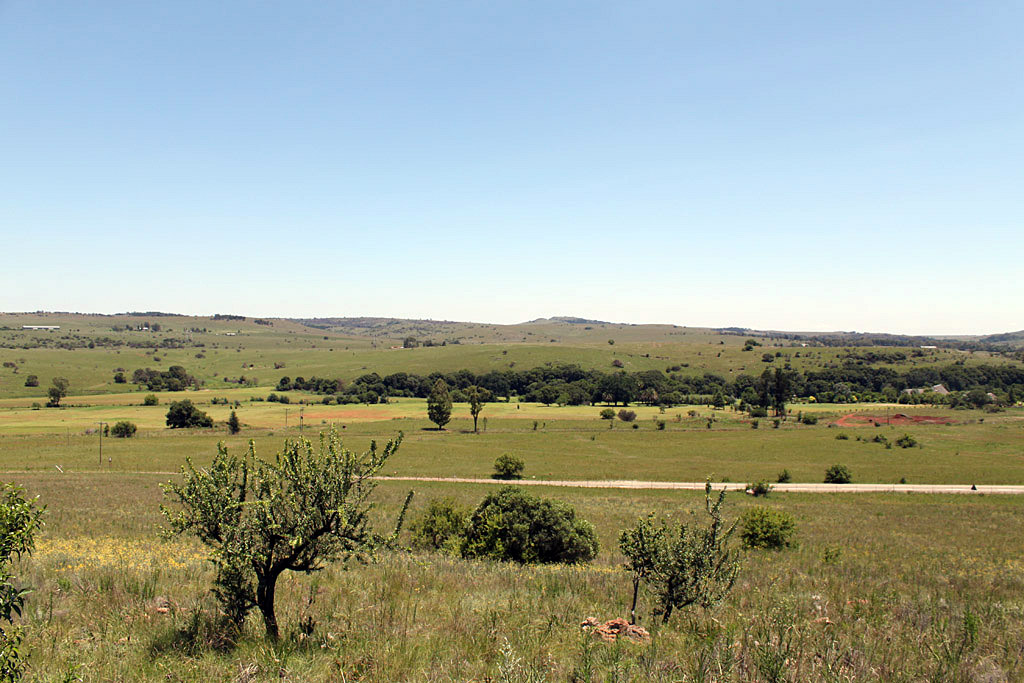
The Roadblock during the sixth leg was set within the landscape of the Cradle of Humankind.

- Episode 6 (23 September 2024)
- Prize: A stay at a hotel suite during the Pit Stop (awarded to Brooke & Adam)
- Eliminated: Havana & Steph

Locations

- Magaliesburg (Mpandlane Village)
- Magaliesburg (Warthogs Bush Lodge)
- Magaliesburg (Plumari Private Reserve)
- Krugersdorp (Nirox Sculpture Park)

Episode summary

- At the start of this leg, teams were instructed to travel by taxi to Mpandlane Village in Magaliesburg and find their next clue.
- This leg's Detour was a choice between High Kick or Paint Slick. In High Kick, teams had to perform a Zulu warrior dance to the satisfaction of the tribal leader before receiving their next clue. In Paint Slick teams had to memorise and replicate a Ndebele color pattern on a traditional clay drinking pot known as a ukhamba before receiving their next clue.
- After the Detour, teams had to travel by taxi to the Warthogs Bush Lodge and sign up for one of two safaris in the Plumari Private Reserve. Teams received their next clue on the following day in the order in which they arrived.
- For their Speed Bump, Pete & Bridget had to clean out the ash from their campfire and restock the firewood before they could continue racing.
- In this leg's Roadblock, one team member had to search an excavation unit for 28 human teeth, which they could exchange with the ranger for their next clue.
- After the Roadblock, teams had to drive to the Pit Stop: the Nirox Sculpture Park in Krugersdorp.

=== Leg 7 (South Africa → Namibia) ===
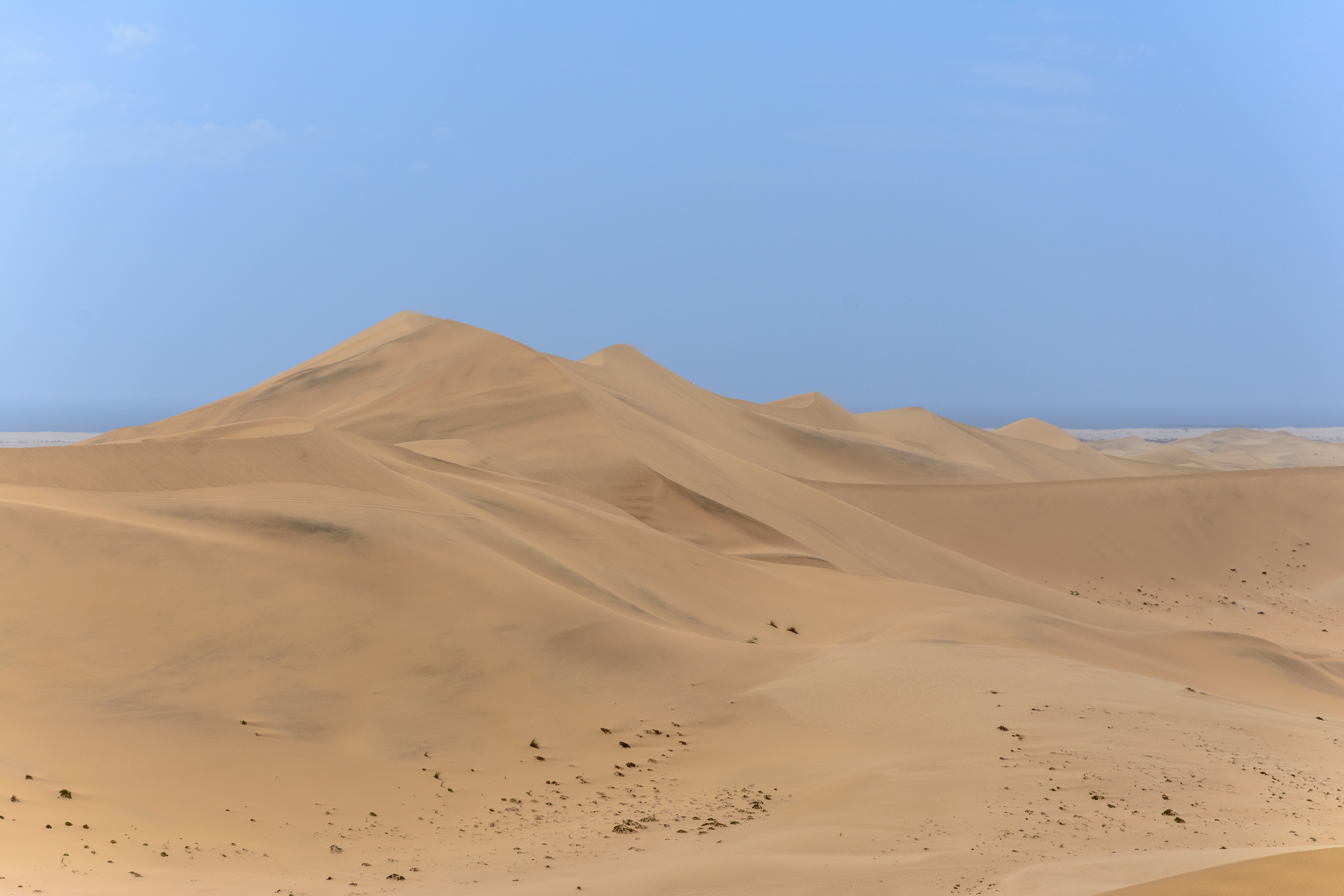
After arriving in Walvis Bay, teams encountered a Detour at Dune 7 within the Namib Desert.

- Episode 7 (29 September 2024)
- Eliminated: Chloe & Emily

Locations

- Johannesburg (O. R. Tambo International Airport) → Walvis Bay, Namibia (Walvis Bay Airport)
- Erongo Region (Dorob National Park – Dune 7)
- Erongo Region (Dorob National Park – Peter's Pan or Snake Bend Pan)
- Walvis Bay (Pelican Point)
- Swakopmund (Mondesa Clinic)
- Swakopmund (E.S.M. Trading Fashion Shop)
- Erongo Region (Dorob National Park – Tumas Pan)

Episode summary

- During the Pit Stop, teams flew to Walvis Bay, Namibia. Teams began the leg outside of the airport and had to drive through the Namib Desert to Dune 7, which had their next clue.
- This leg's Detour, each with a limit of three stations, was a choice between Two By Two or Four By Four. In Two By Two, teams had to climb up the Peter's Pan dune by foot and then ride a sandboard back down before finding their next clue. In Four By Four, teams had to drive twelve kilometers through the dunes near Snake Bend Pan before receiving their next clue.
- After the Detour, teams were driven to Pelican Point, where they had to kayak through a Cape fur seal colony and find four buoys. Teams had to memorise seal facts at each buoy and correctly answer a question before receiving their next clue.
- In this leg's Roadblock, teams had to mix a batch of otjize – a Himba sunscreen made from animal fat and red ochre – and then cover themselves with it before receiving their next clue. To reach the Roadblock, teams were driven out of Pelican Point before driving themselves all the way from Walvis Bay to the Mondesa Clinic in the city of Swakopmund.
- After the Roadblock, teams had purchase four clothing items for a store using only a list written in Damara Nama and bring them back to E.S.M. Trading Fashion Shop before receiving their next clue, which directed them to the Pit Stop: Tumas Pan in Dorob National Park.

Additional note

- Although the last team to arrive at the Pit Stop was eliminated, there was no rest period at the end of the leg and all remaining teams were instead instructed to continue racing.

=== Leg 8 (Namibia) ===
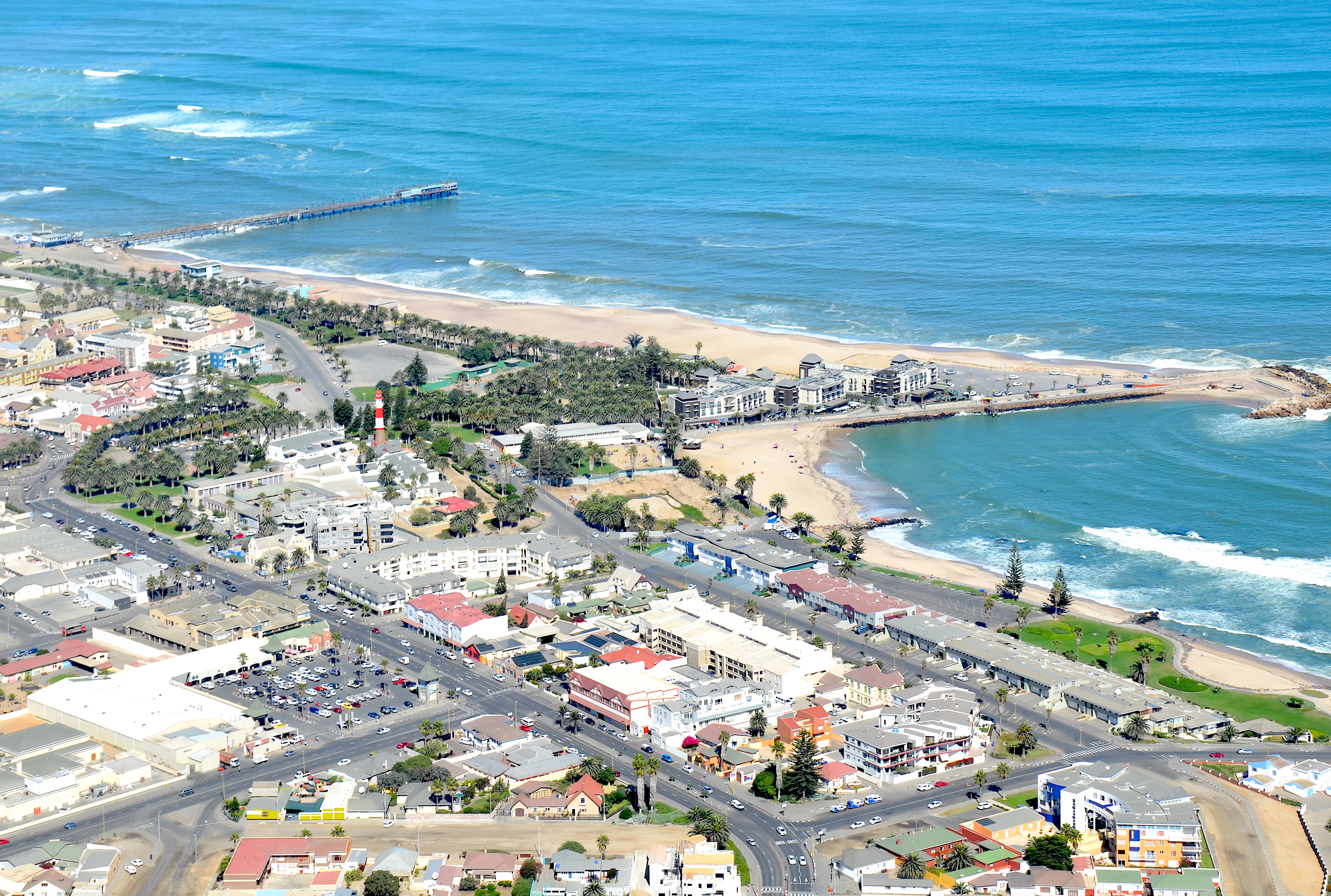
During their extended day in Swakopmund along the Skeleton Coast, teams visited the city's main beach, mole and jetty.

- Episode 8 (30 September 2024)
- Prize: A stay at a hotel suite during the Pit Stop (awarded to Pete & Bridget)

Locations

- Erongo Region (Skeleton Coast – Vierkant Klip Area)
- Swakopmund (Main Beach)
- Swakopmund (Swakopmund Mole)
- Swakopmund (Artists' Arcade or Altstadt Restaurant)
- Swakopmund (Swakopmund Jetty)

Episode summary

- At the start of this leg, teams were instructed to drive to the Vierkant Klip Area of the Skeleton Coast and set up a crystal stall to match an example before receiving their next clue.
- Teams then had to drive to the main beach in Swakopmund and figure out using a poem that their next clue, a message in a bottle sending them to the Swakopmund Mole, was buried beneath a whale spine vertebra.
- This leg's Detour was a choice between Herero Style or German Feast. In Herero Style, teams had to find the Artists' Arcade where they would fold a traditional Herero horned headdress before receiving their next clue. In German Feast, teams had to eat a four-kilogram plate of Schweinshaxe and sauerkraut at the Altstadt Restaurant before receiving their next clue.
- After the Detour, teams had to check in at the Pit Stop: the Swakopmund Jetty.

Additional note

- This was a non-elimination leg.

=== Leg 9 (Namibia) ===
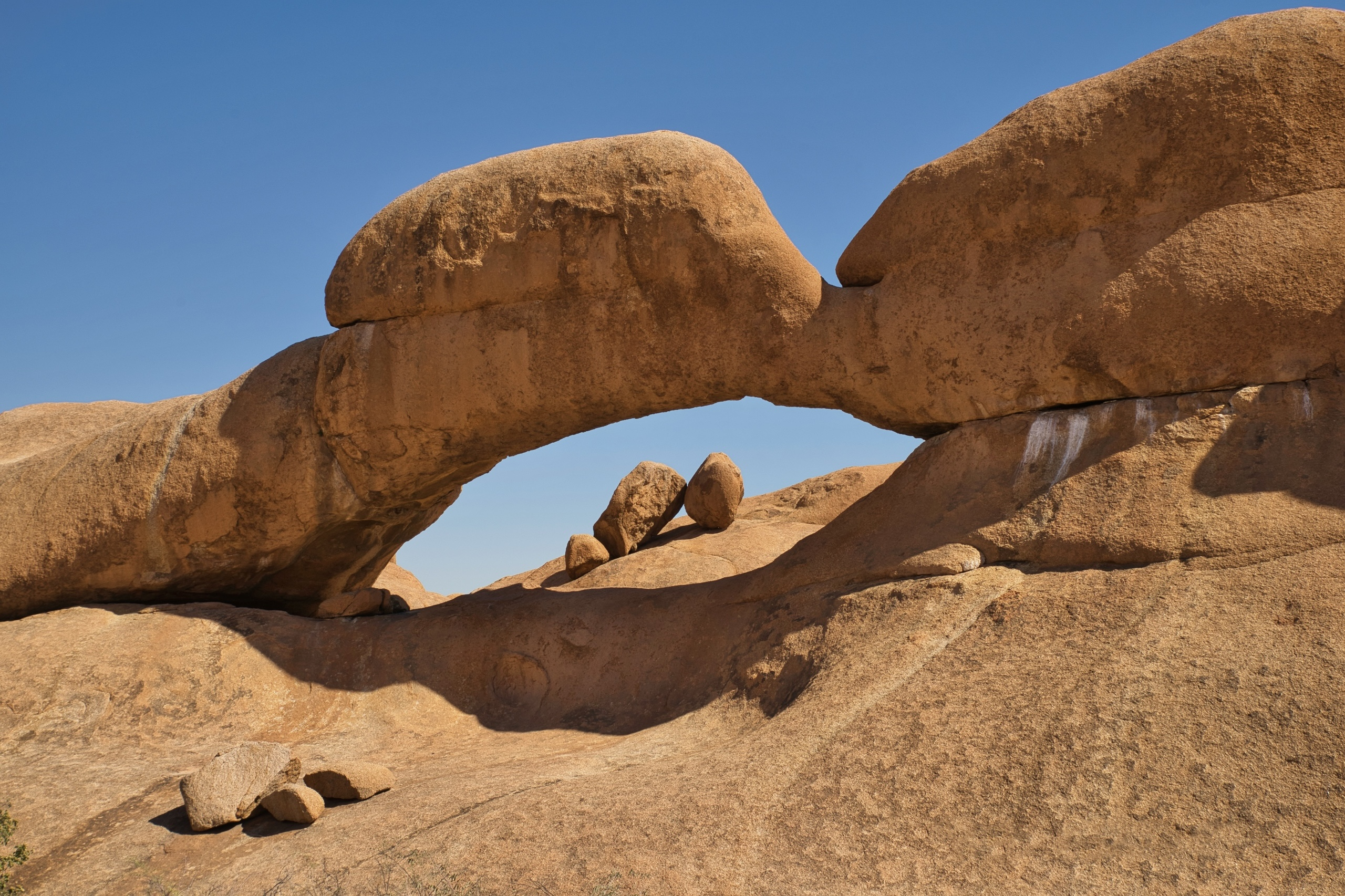
The ninth Pit Stop was located at the Spitzkoppe.

- Episode 9 (6 October 2024)
- Prize: A stay at a hotel suite during the Pit Stop (awarded to Brooke & Adam)
- Eliminated: Thorpie & Christian

Locations

- Swakopmund (Hotel Prinzessin Rupprecht)
- Uigaran (Omandumba – Erongo Mountain Nature Sanctuary)
- Uigaran (Omandumba – Animal Research Station)
- Usakos (Spitzkoppe – The Dome)
- Usakos (Spitzkoppe – The Bridge)

Episode summary

- At the start of this leg, teams were instructed to drive to the Erongo Mountain Nature Sanctuary and find their next clue. There, teams had to collect dung pellets and play a bush game called bokdrol spoeg, which involved both team members spitting a pellet into a target before receiving their next clue.
- For their Speed Bump, Thorpie & Christian had to fill a bowl with dung pellets before they could continue racing.
- This leg's Detour was a choice between Weapons or Water. In Weapons, both team members had to shoot a target with a bow and arrow using San people techniques before receiving their next clue. In Water, teams had to construct a water carrier from an ostrich egg before receiving their next clue.
- After the Detour, teams were brought to the animal research station, where they had to watch trail camera footage from the previous night and identify ten animals before receiving their next clue. Teams then had to drive to the Spitzkoppe and scale the rocks of The Dome in search of their next clue, which directed them to the Pit Stop: The Bridge.

Additional notes

- Chief Benjamin Naruseb, the Headman of Spitzkoppe, appeared as the Pit Stop greeter during this leg.
- Thorpie & Christian fell far behind that The Dome had closed by the time that they had arrived at the Spitzkoppe. They were instructed to head directly to the Pit Stop.

=== Leg 10 (Namibia → Thailand) ===
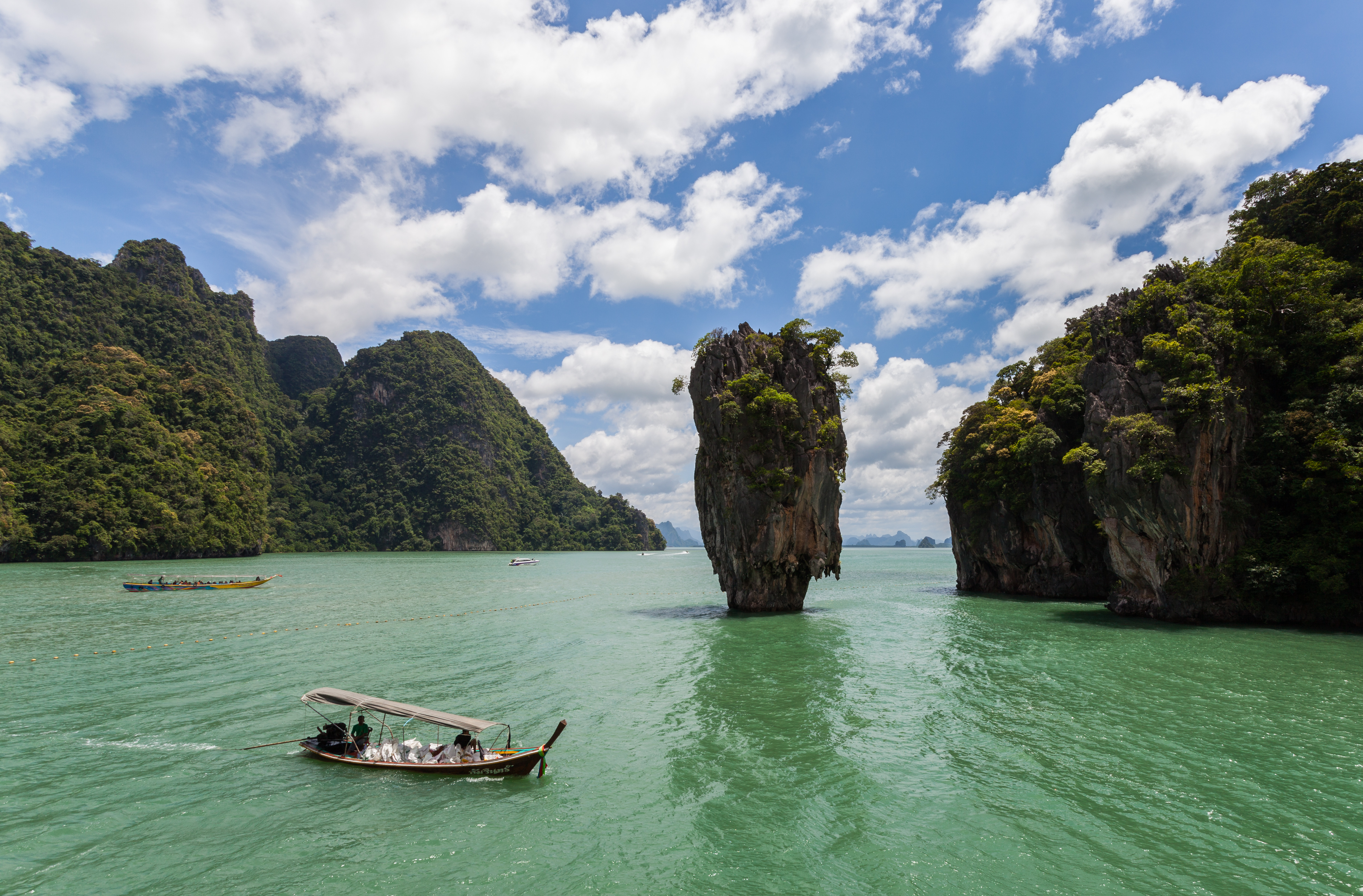
The first Thai leg visited the islands of Phang Nga province including Khao Phing Kan and its islet Koh Ta Pu.

- Episode 10 (7 October 2024)

Locations

- Walvis Bay (Walvis Bay Airport) → Phuket, Thailand (Phuket International Airport)
- Takua Thung (Natai Beach)
- Ao Phang Nga National Park (Koh Panyi)
- Ao Phang Nga National Park (Khao Phing Kan)
- & Takua Thung (Banana Plantation)
- Thai Mueang (Hot Spring Beach)

Episode summary

- During the Pit Stop, teams flew to Phuket, Thailand, and then travelled by songthaew to Natai Beach for their next clue.
- This leg's Detour was a choice between Raise It or Kick It. For this Detour, teams first had to travel by long-tail boat to Koh Panyi. In Raise It, teams had to find two shops using a map, pick up bamboo poles and flags, deliver them to the Newfern Restaurant and raise the flags before receiving their next clue. In Kick It, teams had to complete a series of soccer drills on Koh Panyi's floating soccer field before receiving their next clue.
- After the Detour, teams had to travel to Khao Phing Kan, an island that appeared in the James Bond film The Man with the Golden Gun, and swim to their next clue. Teams then had to search the island for a man with golden sunglasses, who had their next clue.
- After returning to the mainland, teams had to travel to a banana plantation near Na Nuea Stadium in Khok Kloi and prepare six servings of khao tom mud – a banana and sticky rice dessert wrapped in a banana leaf – before receiving their next clue, which directed them to the Pit Stop: Hot Spring Beach at The Hotspring Beach Resort & Spa in Thai Mueang.

Additional note

- This was a non-elimination leg.

=== Leg 11 (Thailand) ===
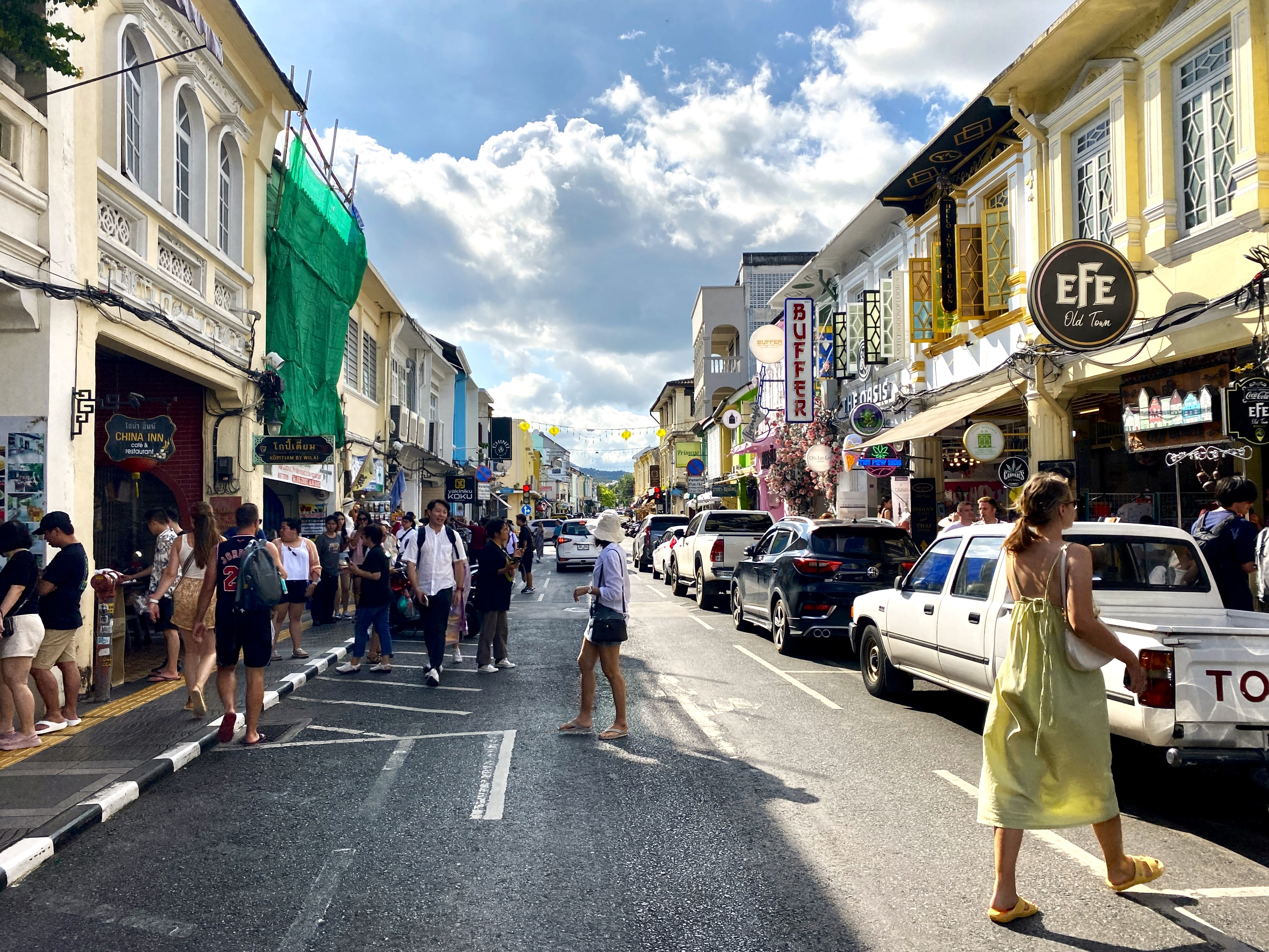
One Detour option in Phuket had teams visit Thalang Road in the city's old town.

- Episode 11 (13 October 2024)
- Eliminated: Pete & Bridget

Locations

- Takua Thung (Sarasin Bridge)
- Thalang (Phuket Gateway)
- Thalang (Phuket Elephant Care)
- Thalang (Bankokwatmai School)
- Phuket (Athena Cabaret or Phuket Old Town – Thalang Road)
- Phuket (Khao Rang Viewpoint)

Episode summary

- At the start of this leg, teams were instructed to travel by songthaew to the Phuket Gateway and search under an art exhibition of turtle eggs for their next clue. Teams then had to travel to Phuket Elephant Care and give an elephant a clay bath and shower before receiving their next clue.
- For their Speed Bump, Billy & Oscar had to roll clay balls and fill three buckets before they could continue racing.
- In this season's final Roadblock, one team member had to shoot down ten cans using a slingshot before receiving their next clue.
- This season's final Detour, each with a limit of two stations, was a choice between Fame or Frame. In Fame, teams had to dress a cabaret performer in the same outfit as the performer on stage, who was only revealed to teams for ten seconds at random intervals, before receiving their next clue. In Frame, teams had to memorise three photographs of buildings along Thalang Road, find the three buildings and recite the street numbers to a judge before receiving their next clue.
- After the Detour, teams had to check in at the Pit Stop: Khao Rang Viewpoint.

=== Leg 12 (Thailand) ===
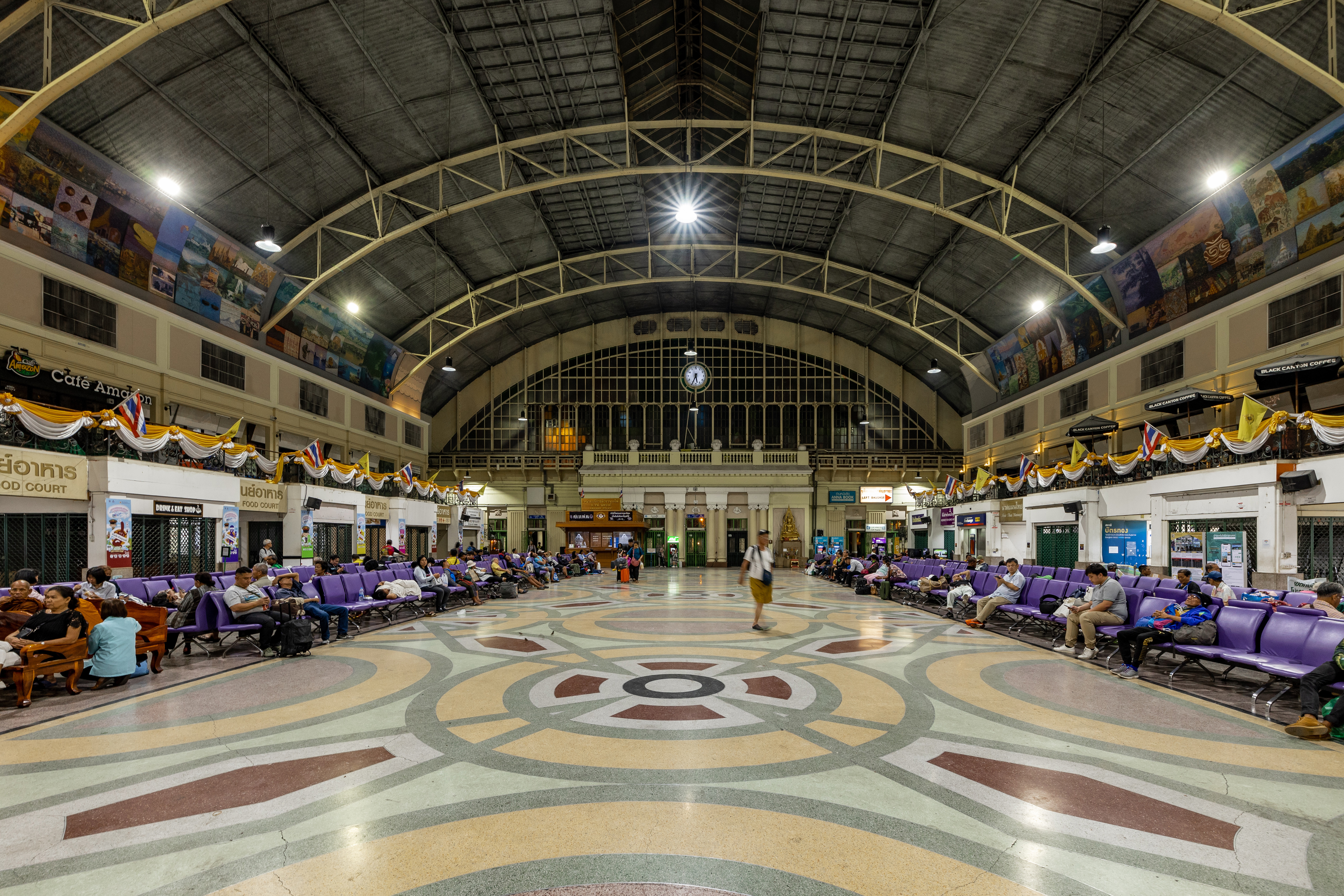
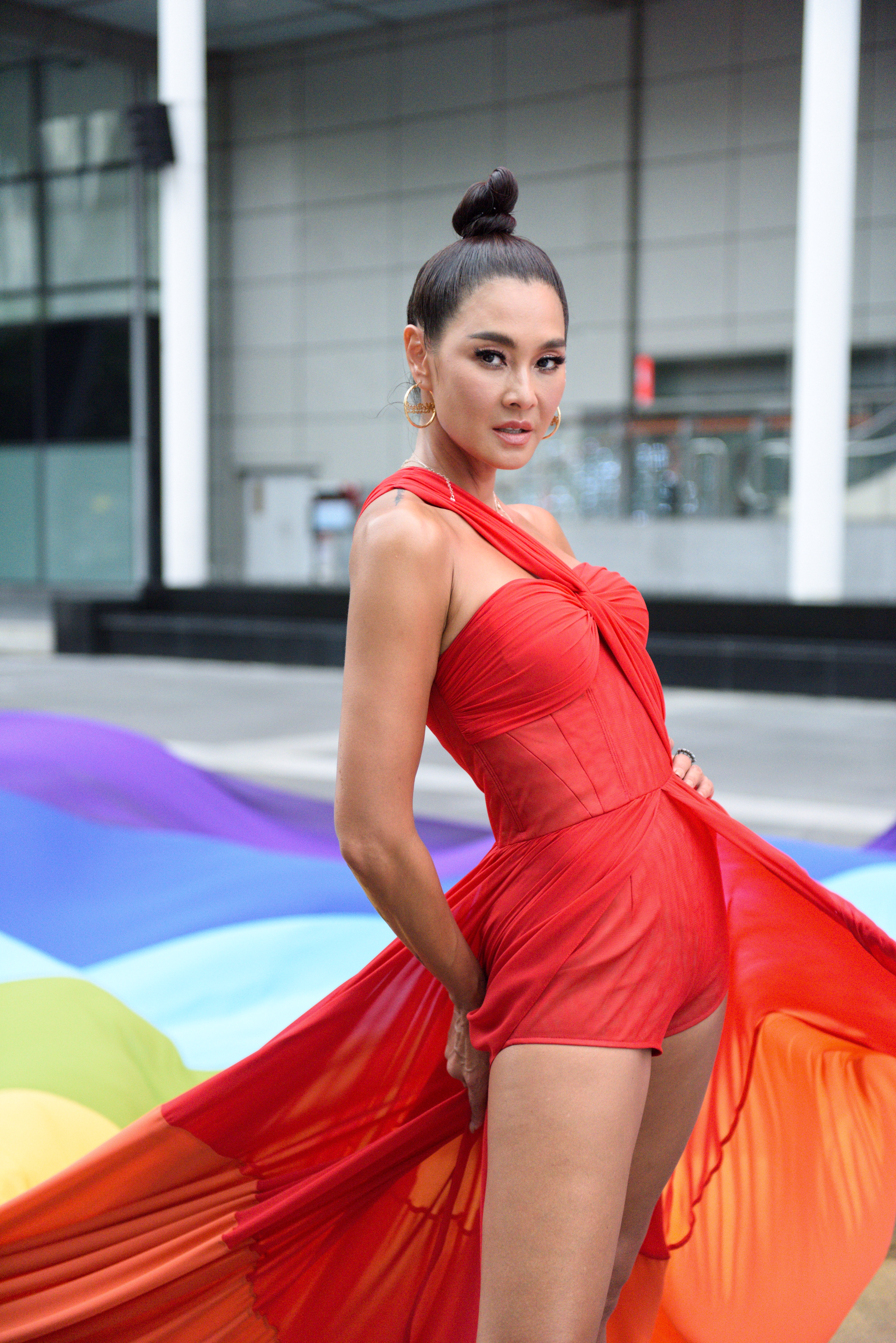
The celebrities crossed the finish line inside the Hua Lamphong Railway Station in Bangkok, where they were greeted by Lukkade Metinee.
- Episode 12 (20 October 2024)
- Prize: A$100,000 for the team's chosen charity
- Winners: Bam Bam & Logan
- Runners-up: Billy & Oscar
- Third place: Brooke & Adam

Locations

- Phuket (Phuket International Airport) → Bangkok (Don Mueang International Airport)
- Bangkok (Chong Nonsi Skywalk)
- Bangkok (Nopparat Theatre)
- Bangkok (Chinatown – Chinatown Gate)
- Bangkok (Plaeng Nam Road – Khao Thom 3/1)
- Bangkok (NT Tower Bangrak)
- Bangkok (Hua Lamphong Railway Station)

Episode summary

- During the Pit Stop, teams flew to Bangkok and began the final leg simultaneously at the Chong Nonsi Skywalk before finding their next clue.
- Teams were instructed to travel by tuk-tuk to the Nopparat Theatre and perform a Thai sword dance before receiving their next clue. Teams then had to travel to Chinatown Gate and deliver two 20-kilogram catfish by hand to an eatery on Plaeng Nam Road before receiving their next clue.
- After delivering the fish, teams had to prepare and eat frog curry along with preprepared duck neck and fried waterbugs before receiving their next clue. Teams then had to travel to NT Tower Bangrak and stack twelve large blocks with symbols from previous legs before receiving their final clue, which directed them to the finish line: the Hua Lamphong Railway Station.

Leg	Symbol	Source
1	Paw print	Paseadores de perros shirt
2	Horseshoe	Gaucho hat
3	Chakana	Detour decision point
4	Big 5	African buffalo statue
5	Musical note	Drum task
6	Wine	Warthogs Bush Lodge
7	Scorpion	Namib Desert
8	Whale skeleton	Swakopmund Main Beach
9	Sun	Nature sanctuary reservist shirt
10	Fish	Long-tail boat
11	Outline of Phuket	Songthaew
12	Circular design	Eatery placemats

Additional notes

- At the start of the leg, Beau explicitly outlined that only one team would win the Final Leg and the charity prize.
- Actress and model Lukkade Metinee appeared as the finish line greeter for this leg.

== Reception ==
=== Ratings ===
On 28 January 2024, OzTAM's ratings data recording system changed. Viewership data focuses on National Reach (viewed for more than one minute) and National Total ratings (average viewership) instead of providing data on the 5 metro centres and overnight shares.

Week	Episode	Airdate	Timeslot	Overnight			7 Day Timeshift			Source
Week	Episode	Airdate	Timeslot	Reach viewers	Total viewers	Rank	Reach viewers	Total viewers	Rank	Source
1	1	9 September 2024	Monday 7:30 pm	1,435,000	699,000	6	1,802,000	979,000	5	
1	2	10 September 2024	Tuesday 7:30 pm	1,167,000	572,000	12	1,502,000	826,000	6	
2	3	15 September 2024	Sunday 7:00 pm	1,080,000	534,000	10	1,392,000	775,000	8	
2	4	16 September 2024	Monday 7:30 pm	1,125,000	544,000	12	1,441,000	777,000	8	
3	5	22 September 2024	Sunday 7:00 pm	1,073,000	482,000	9	1,356,000	707,000	7	
3	6	23 September 2024	Monday 7:30 pm	1,012,000	478,000	14	1,324,000	711,000	11	
4	7	29 September 2024	Sunday 7:00 pm	979,000	516,000	11	1,254,000	728,000	8	
4	8	30 September 2024	Monday 7:30 pm	1,028,000	535,000	14	1,311,000	746,000	10	
5	9 (Note: Episode 9 aired the same night as the 2024 NRL Grand Final.)	6 October 2024	Sunday 7:00 pm	896,000	457,000	12	1,135,000	643,000	9	
5	10	7 October 2024	Monday 7:30 pm	1,028,000	527,000	13	1,310,000	736,000	10	
6	11	13 October 2024	Sunday 7:00 pm	949,000	559,000	13	1,194,000	755,000	11	
7	12	20 October 2024	Sunday 7:00 pm	986,000	611,000	10	1,172,000	763,000	9	
