= Dune 7 (Namibia) =

Highest sand dune in Namibia

Coordinates: 22°57′54″S 14°35′26″E

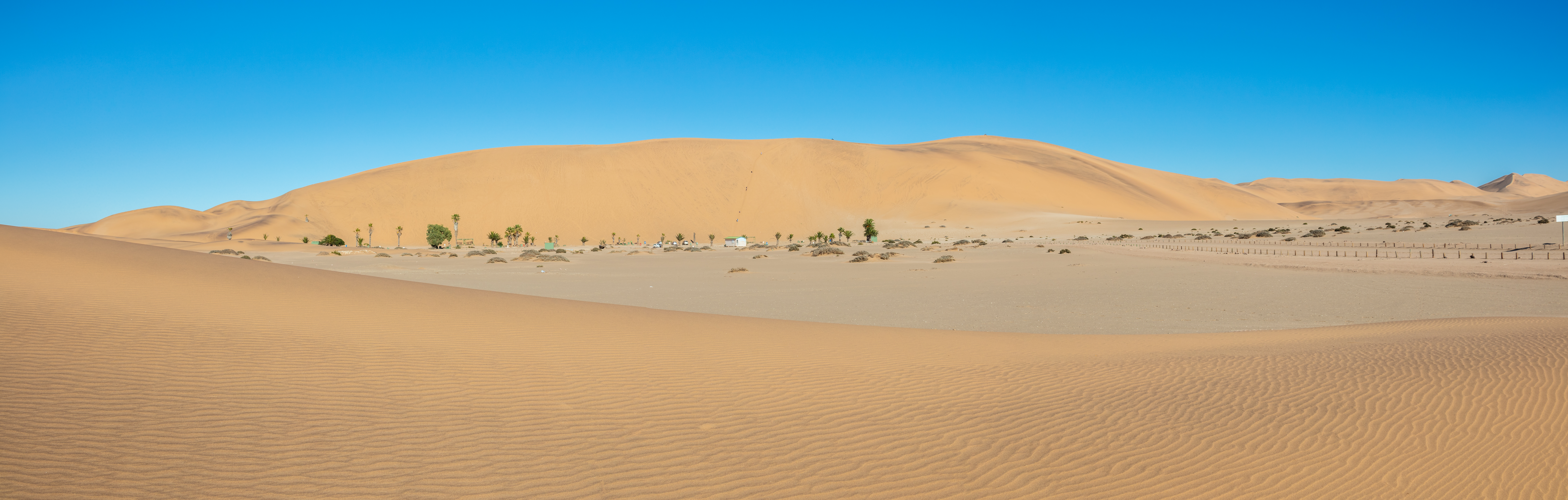
Dune 7

Dune 7, located outside of Walvis Bay and became a landmark as it was 7 miles from the town centre. Dune 7 is part of the dune belt that runs from Walvis Bay to Swakopmund . In addition it is famous around the world, and it is one of the most popular coastal tourist attraction sites. It has been free to access all past years, but on 1 December 2022, a fee to enter the area was mandatory.

This dune is located inside the Dorob National Park and is managed under concession by Sandwich Dune Tours and Safari as of the 15th of June 2023.
