= Spitzkoppe =

Mountain in Namibia

Coordinates: 21°49′32″S 15°11′42″E

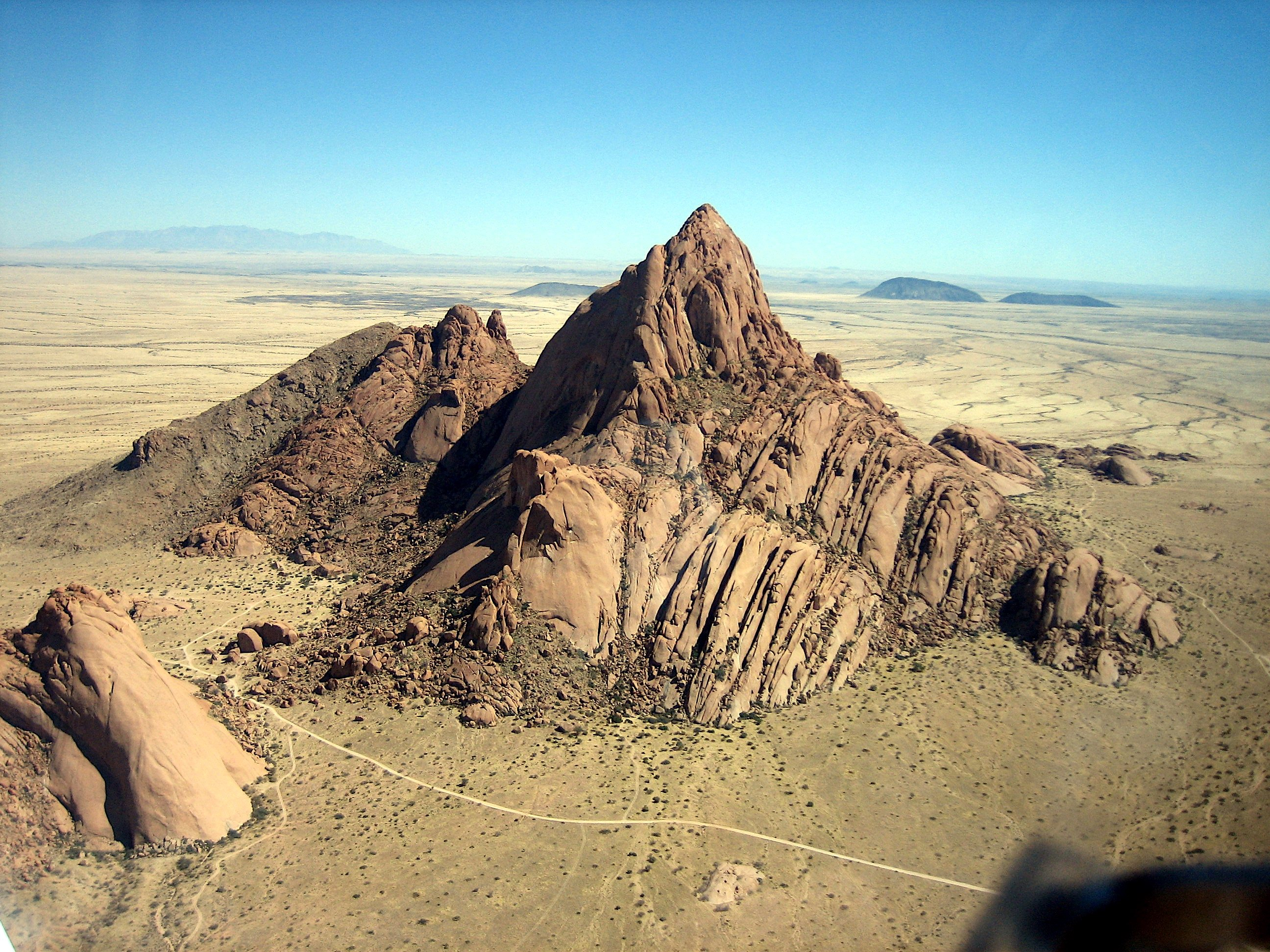
Aerial view of Spitzkoppe

Location map of the Spitzkoppe

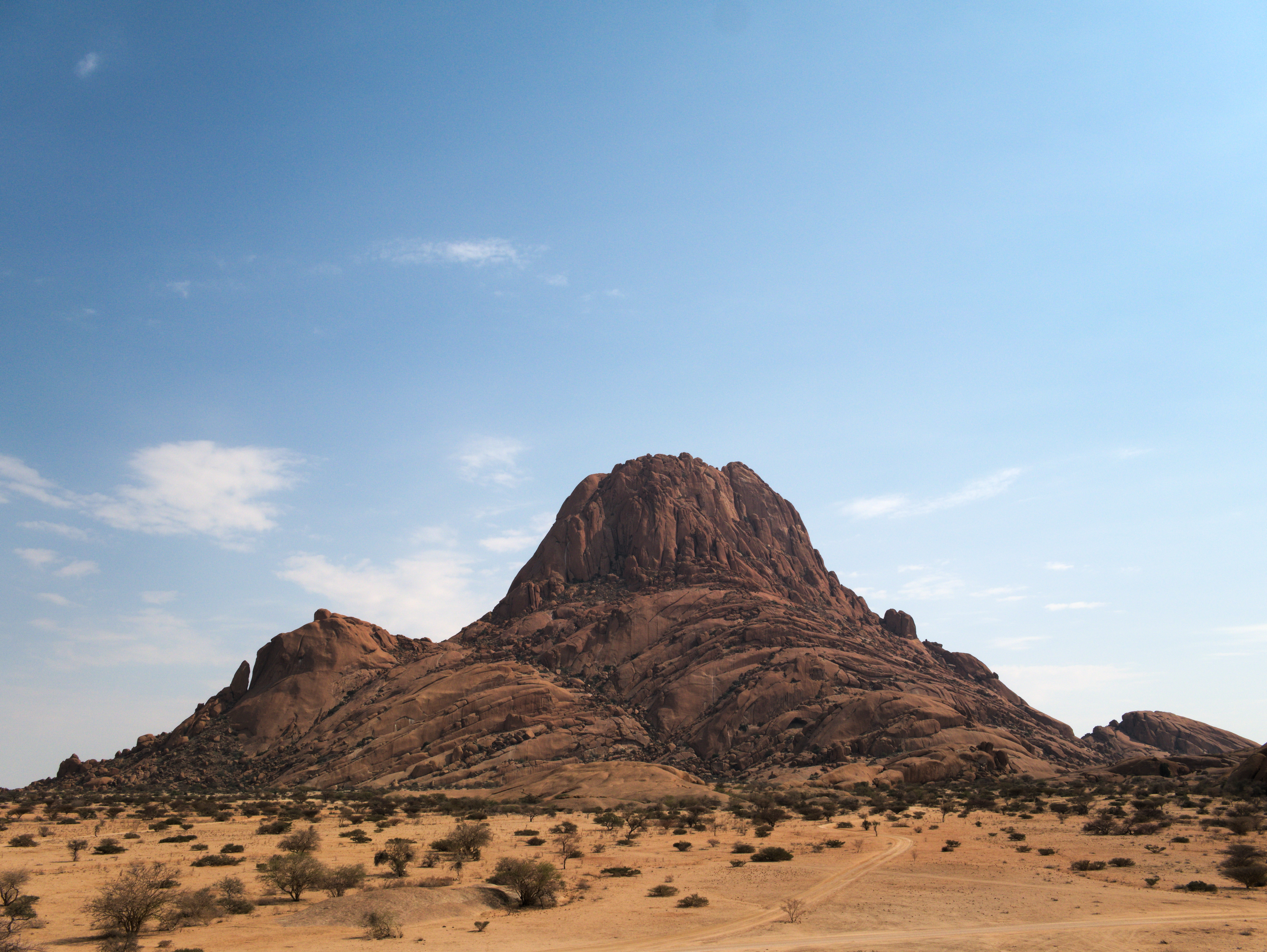
The Spitzkoppe peak in Namibia, seen from a distance at the "Rock Arch" viewpoint

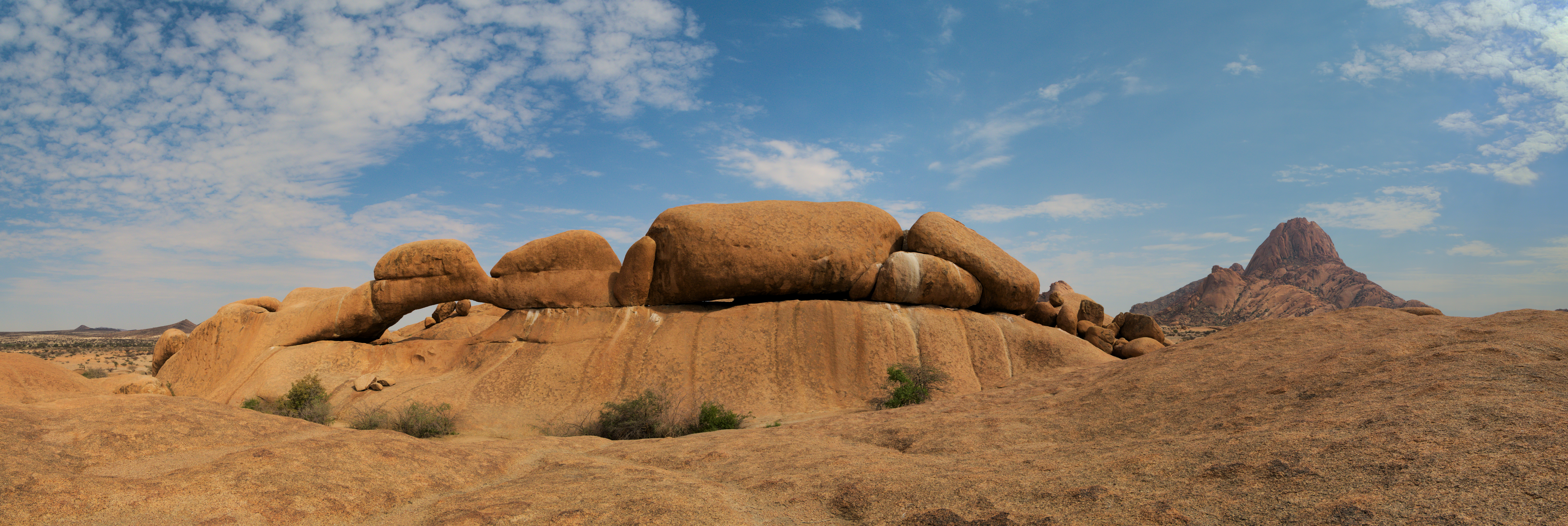
Panorama of the Rock Arch and Spitzkoppe in the background

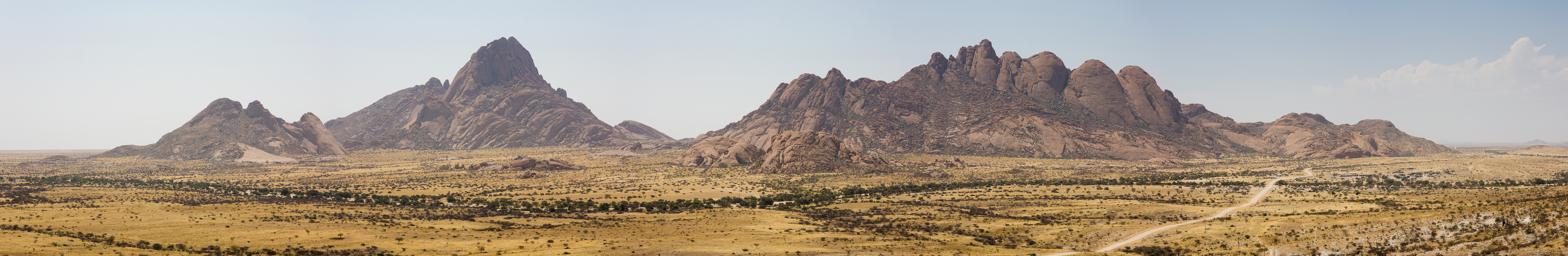
Panorama of Spitzkoppe and the mountains around

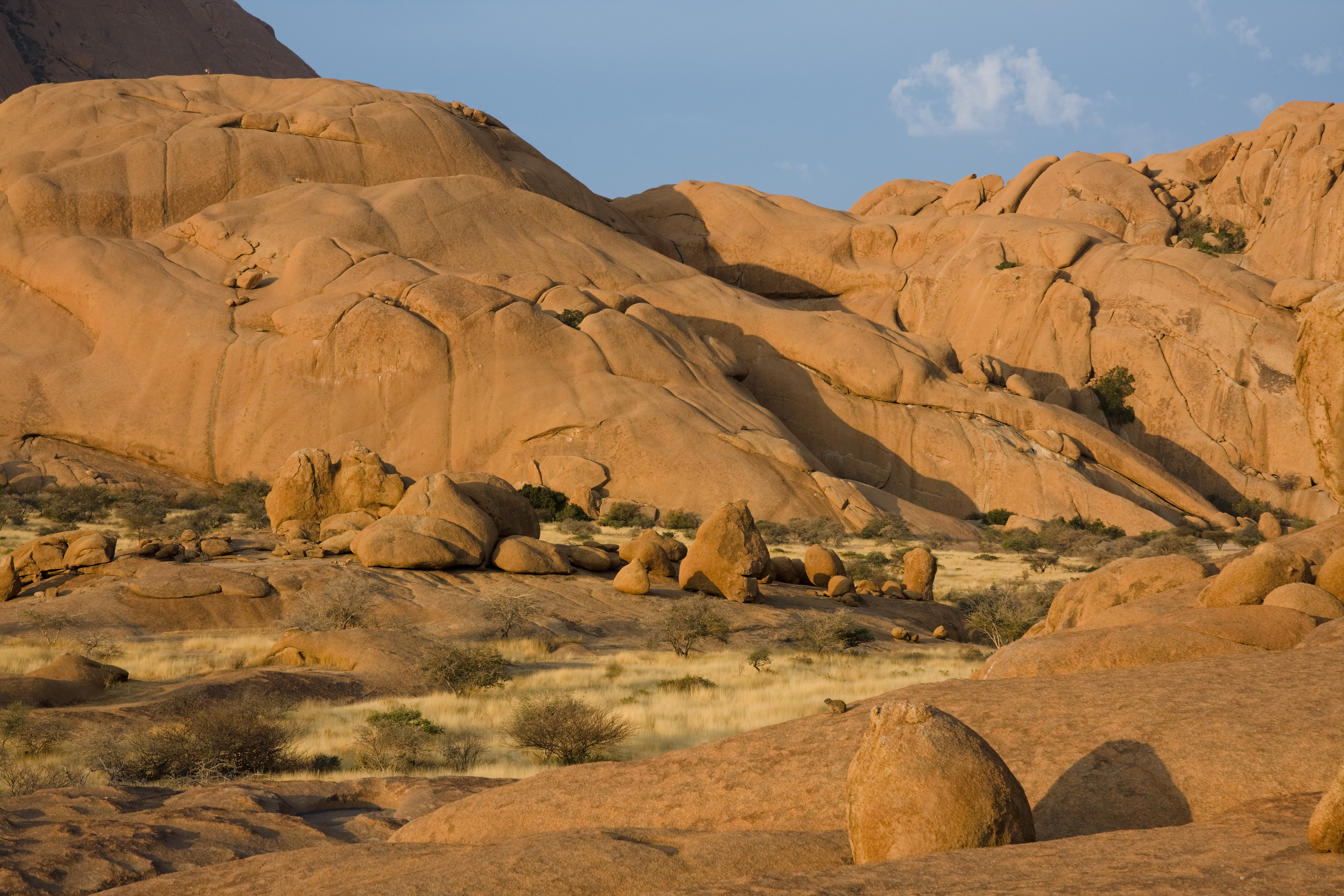
The campsite at the foot of Spitzkoppe

The Spitzkoppe (from German for "pointed dome"; also referred to as Spitzkop, Groot Spitzkop, or the "Matterhorn of Namibia") is a group of bald granite peaks or inselbergs located between Usakos and Swakopmund in the Namib desert of Namibia. The granite is more than 120 million years old and the highest outcrop rises about 1,728 metres (5,669 ft) above sea level. The peaks stand out dramatically from the flat surrounding plains. The highest peak is about 670 m (2,200 ft) above the floor of the desert below. A minor peak – the Little Spitzkoppe – lies nearby at an elevation of 1,557 m (5,108 ft). Other prominences stretch out into a range known as the Pontok Mountains.

Many examples of Bushmen artwork can be seen painted on the rock in the Spitzkoppe area. Photographs of the Spitzkoppe Mountains were used as backgrounds for 2001: A Space Odyssey in the "Dawn of Man" sequences.

== History of ascent ==
Any ascent of the peak involves exposed and delicate rock climbing of a high grade. While the standard route up the peak is not severely difficult in modern technical terms, it presented quite a formidable undertaking in the earliest days, owing to the isolation of the peak, the heat of the desert and the total lack of water.

Before the First World War what is now Namibia was German South-West Africa. It is possible that the main peak was reached as early as 1904, when a soldier of the Imperial Schutztruppe supposedly soloed the peak and made a fire on the summit. What he may have burned remains a mystery, as there is no natural fuel of any kind on the upper parts of the peak. The legend suggests that he never returned and that his body was never recovered. Certainly, no proof of his conquest is available today. The first documented conquest was made by a team of climbers from Cape Town, led by S. le Roux. The next party – O'Neil, Shipley and Schaff – pioneered a route up the northern extremes of the peak, after having failed on the southwest ridge. They gained access to the gully now known as the "scramble" but ran out of time to attempt the final faces. Four days later they made another attempt but finally gave up. Some of the earliest climbers, defeated by an extraordinarily smooth band of granite only about 3m high, resorted to carving steps into the rock with a hammer and chisel.

A few months later Hans and Else Wong and Jannie de Villiers Graaff arrived and they reached the summit at noon, in November 1946. For the next quarter of a century the mountain maintained its reputation of presenting a two- or three-day struggle to potential climbers. (There are accounts of these ascents in old volumes of the Journal of The Mountain Club of South Africa – one of which can be found at scanned extracts from MCSA Journal.)

This era came to an end in 1971, when the peak was climbed in four hours by a party led by J. W. Marchant from the University of Cape Town Mountain and Ski Club. Included were the talented South African climber Gabriel Athiros and Oliver Stansfield from England [2 June 1971]. This team scaled all of the lower pitches without ropes and got through the difficult band without using the artificial steps hacked into the granite. They descended from the peak in two hours and as they reached the base rain began to fall for the first time in over a year.

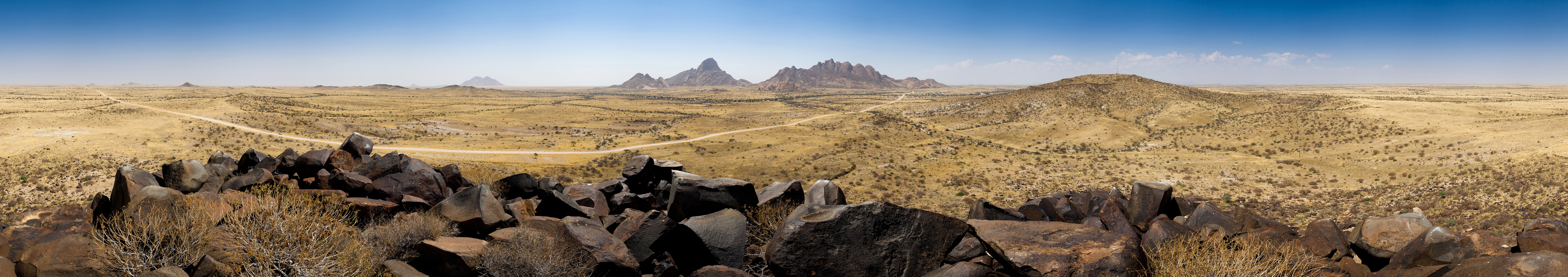
Panorama with Spitzkoppe and the surrounding

The modern era commenced. E. Haber, together with A. Lombard, C. Ward and Holding completed the first direct ascent of the South West Wall. They began their endeavours in 1977 but did not succeed in finishing the route before 1982. M. Cartwright and M. Hislop freed the route in 1988, giving it a grade of 22, which was later revised to 24. C. Edelstein and G. Mallory left their mark in 1983 by completing "Royale Flush", another monster route that was freed only in 2000 by J. Wamsteker and S. Wallis. During 1991 M. Cartwright, K. Smith and M. Seegers put up a difficult route named INXS graded 24 left of the South West Wall route.

== General development and history ==
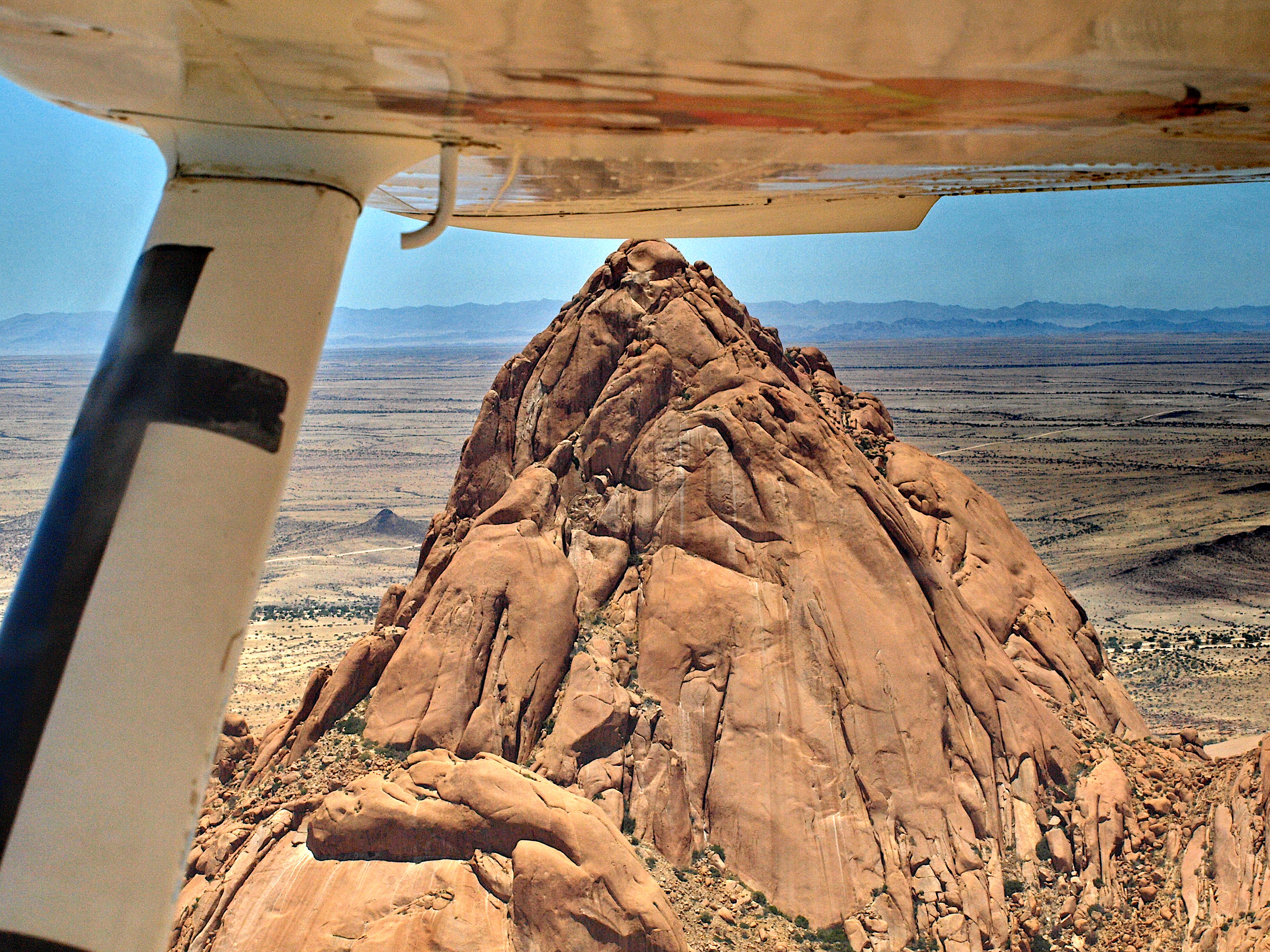
Aerial view of Spitzkoppe

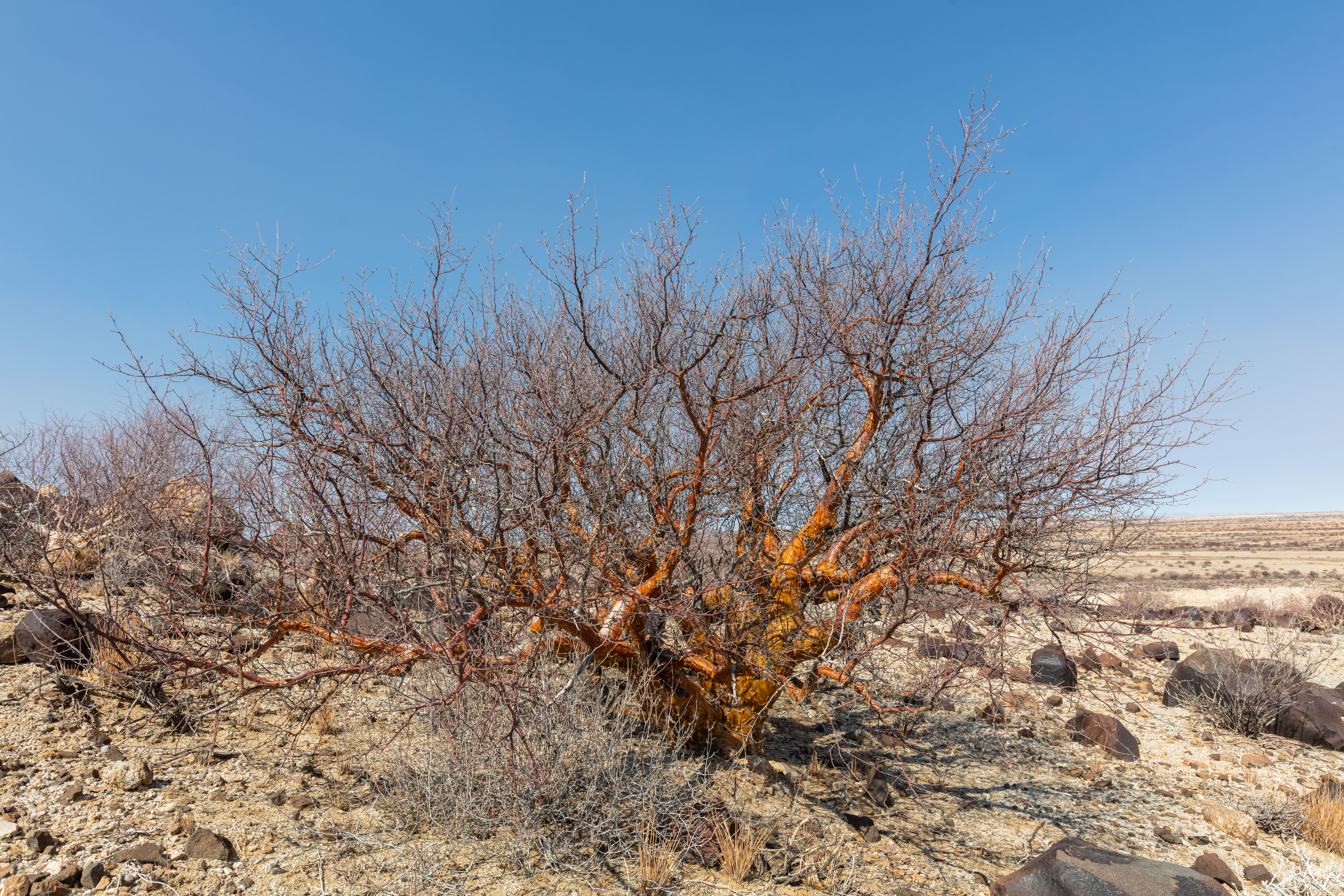
The butter bush is commonly found around Spitzkoppe.

In 1896, a trading post named Spitzkopje was built below the mountain by the German Colonial Society, the centrepiece of a 120,000-hectare farm. The Society built a five-room farmhouse and stables, storerooms and other outbuildings. In 1899 the farm held 120 horses, 1,500 cattle and 4,000 sheep and goats; its manager was a German settler named Carl Schlettwein. Later it was transferred to the Farmer Jooste and a police station was built (the foundation walls are still under Pontok 4 chroma noise).

In 1964, under the "Odendaal Plan" of the Odendaal Commission for the creation of home territories (home lands) for the black population, the farm was expropriated with compensation. In 1970 they moved multiple Damara families here, which were in fact a village with a church and school development. Since 1998, the municipal campsite and the area was declared as Gaingu Conservancy on 7 September 2003 around the Great Spitzkoppe. A Hollywood film company erected a high game fence which cuts off the entire area between the large Spitzkoppe and Spitzkoppe Pontoks. This represents about half of the camping places which ceased to exist, access to many climbing rocks and also the normal route to the Great Spitzkoppe barred. The popular Circumnavigation of the Great Spitzkoppe (1–1.5 hours) is no longer possible.

"Bushman Paradise" made accessible through a gate with chains, has lost its attractiveness, as almost all of the 2000- to 4000-year-old prehistoric rock paintings have been destroyed. Around the foot of the Great Spitzkoppe you can still find good drawings, especially at the "Rhino Rock". The site has a population of community members who over the years started living and grazing their livestock in the area. It has leadership of a headman, vice headman and councillors.
