= Sam Yot MRT station =

Railway station in Bangkok, Thailand

สามยอด BL30 Sam Yot PP23
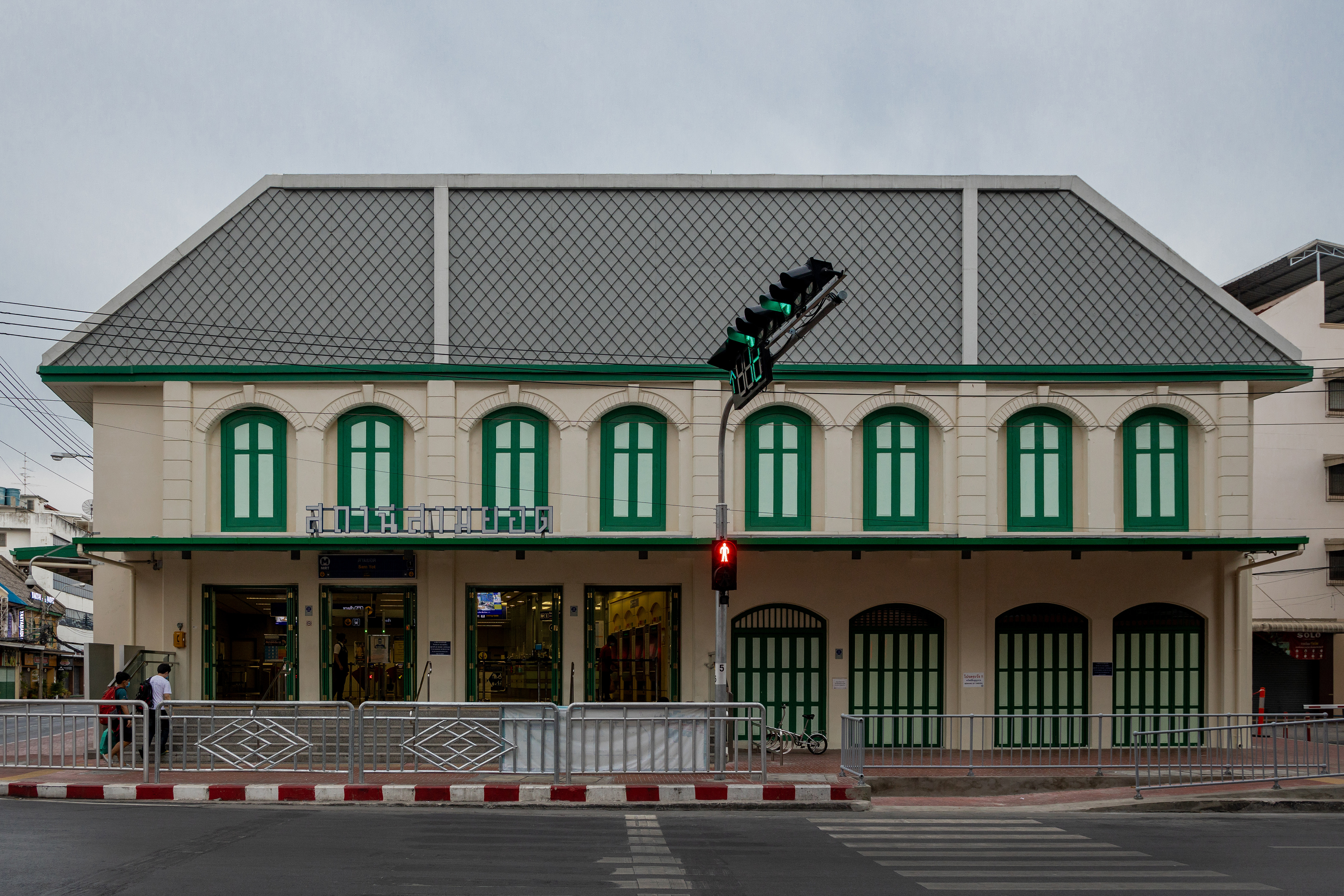
- The Sino-Portuguese building housing Exit 1

General information
- Location: Samran Rat and Wang Burapha Phirom Subdistricts, Phra Nakhon District, Bangkok, Thailand
- Coordinates: 13°44′49.1″N 100°30′11.4″E
- System: | MRT MRT
- Owner: Mass Rapid Transit Authority of Thailand
- Operator: Bangkok Expressway and Metro Public Company Limited
- Line: Blue Line Purple Line (under construction)
- Platforms: 2 (2 split platforms) + 2 (1 island platform)(under construction)
- Tracks: 2 + 2 (under construction)

Construction
- Structure type: Underground
- Parking: Not available
- Cycle facilities: Yes
- Accessible: Yes

Other information
- Station code: BL30 PP23 (under construction)

History
- Opened: 29 July 2019; 7 years ago (Blue Line); 2027; 1 year's time (Purple Line)
- Former names: Wang Burapha

Passengers
- 2021: 1,758,892

Services
Preceding station	Metropolitan Rapid Transit	Following station
Sanam Chai towards Lak Song	Blue Line	Wat Mangkon towards Tha Phra via Bang Sue
Under construction
Democracy Monument towards Tao Poon	Purple Line Southern Extension	Memorial Bridge towards Khru Nai
Location

Sam Yot station (Thai: สถานีสามยอด, pronounced [sā.tʰǎː.nīː sǎːm jɔ̂ːt]) is a Bangkok MRT rapid transit station on the Blue Line. The station is located in Samran Rat and Wang Burapha Phirom subdistrict of Phra Nakhon district, Bangkok. It is regarded as one of four most beautiful MRT stations; the other three are Itsaraphap station, Sanam Chai station, and Wat Mangkon station. It is located underground between Sam Yot Intersection of Charoen Krung Road and Maha Chai Road, of which the station is named after, to the Unakan Intersection between Charoen Krung and Burapha with Unakan Roads.

== Design ==
The interior of the station has been designed to retain the atmosphere of the Wang Burapha quarter through the architectural style prevalent at the time of His Majesty King Chulalongkorn (Rama V)'s reign together with Sino-Portuguese style, three entrance building were built as entrance into the station and the wall carved to accommodate folding doors, an entrance style popular in the old days. As for the pillars in station and the ticket office, the shape and characteristic of the Sam Yot Arch (one of the Royal Grand Palace's outer city gates that was once located at eponymous intersection before the expansion of Charoen Krung Road) is used as decoration to convey the history of the area. The interior of the station also displays pictures of the old days giving insight to the history and origin of the location to passerby. That is why this station was originally named Wang Burapha Station.

Sam Yot is an area bustling with activity, due to the presence of nearby shopping centres, including; Pratu Phi, Khlong Thom, Saphan Han, Phahurat, Sampheng, The Old Siam Plaza, Ban Mo, Pak Khlong Talat, Sala Chalermkrung, leading education institutes such as; Poh-Chang Academy of Arts and Suankularb Wittayalai School, and the important historical sites; Giant Swing and Wat Suthat.

== Archeological excavation at station area ==
During archaeological excavations to build the station, a number of ancient artifacts, all of which are related to trams were discovered. This included parts of wood and brick used as building material, drainage gutter lines, parts of steel tram tracks and part of terracotta containers, etc. In the past, the Charoen Krung Line of the Bangkok trams ran near here.

== Station layout ==
G Ground floor	Street level	Bus Stop, exits 1-3
B2; Platform	Side Platform, Doors will open on the left.
B2; Platform	Platform 2	Blue towards Tha Phra via Bang Sue (Wat Mangkon)
B3; Platform (under construction)	Platform 3	Purple towards Khlong Bang Phai (Democracy Monument)
B3; Platform (under construction)	Island platform, doors will open on the right
B3; Platform (under construction)	Platform 4	Purple towards Khru Nai (Memorial Bridge)
B4; Platform	Side Platform, Doors will open on the right.
B4; Platform	Platform 1	Blue towards Lak Song (Sanam Chai)

== Future ==
The station will connect to the MRT Purple Line once the southern extension from Tao Poon to Rat Burana is completed. The transfer hall was built in preparation of Purple Line extension. The project is currently under construction.

Sam Yot Station Traditional sign

== Gallery ==
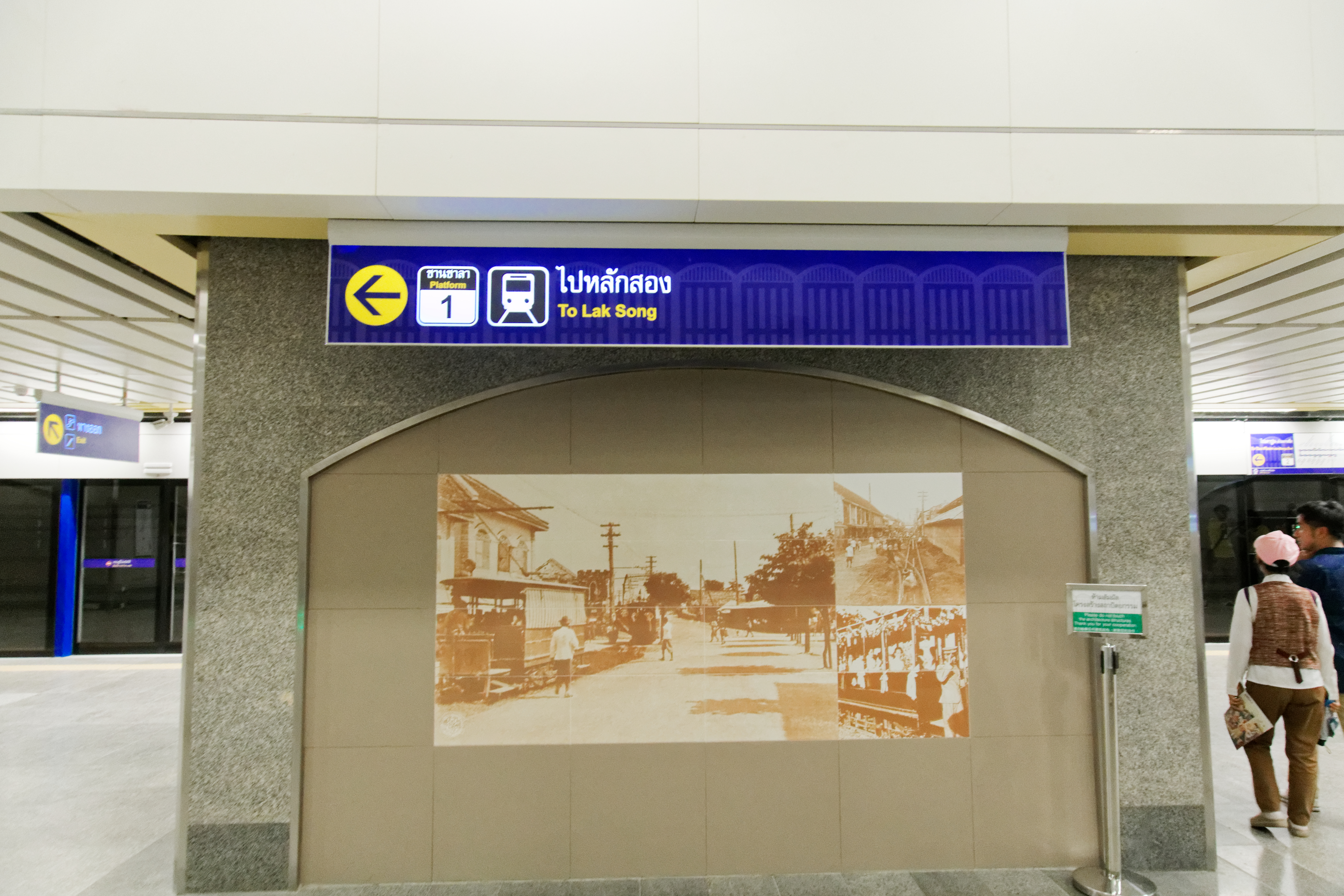
Old photograph of trams which used to operate in the area

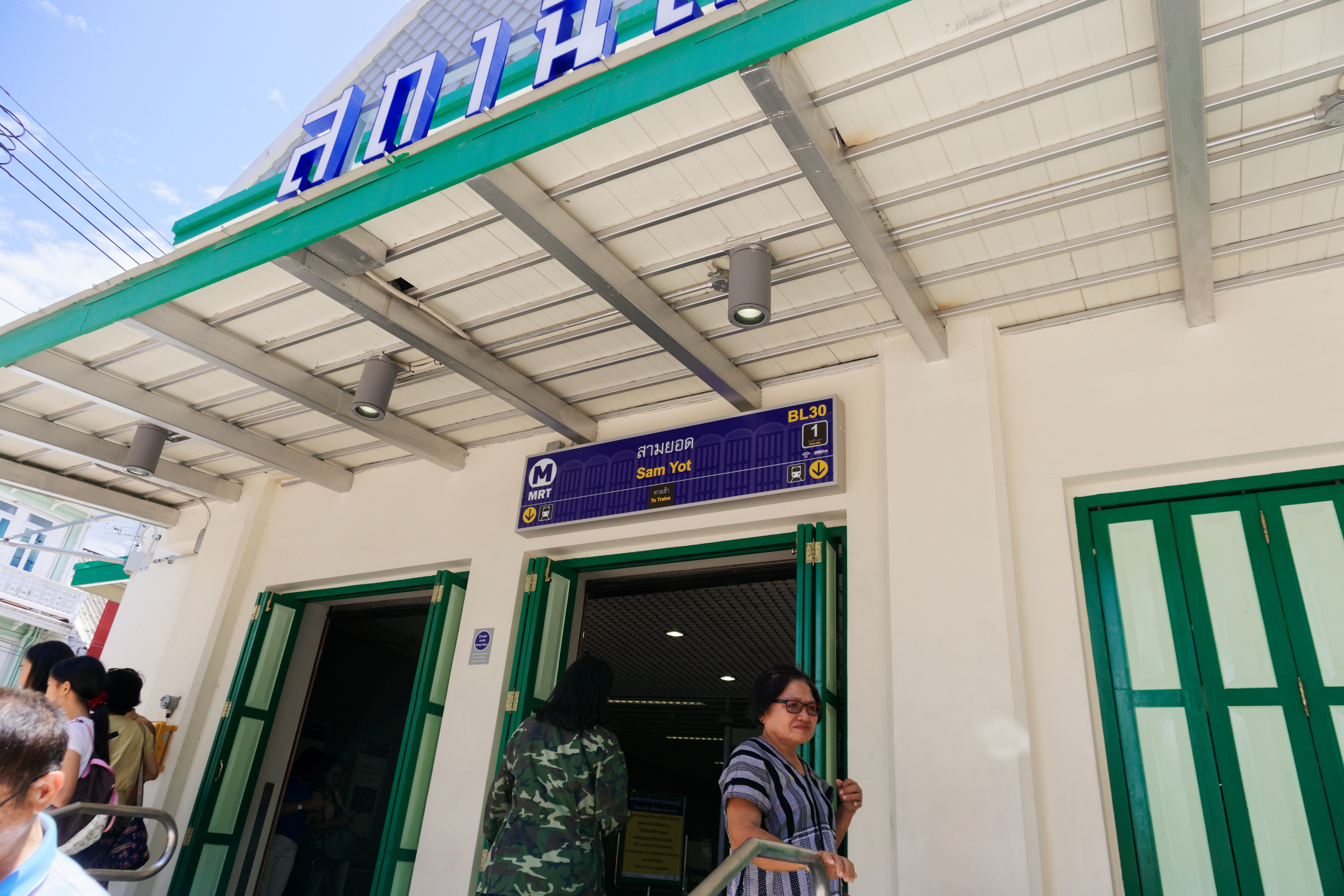
Exit 1

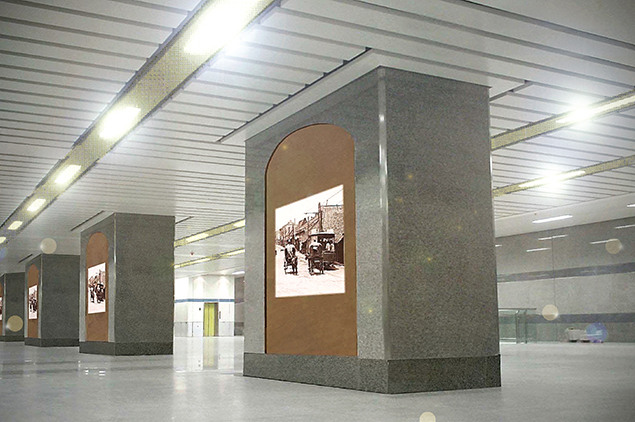
Pillars decorated with old pictures that reflect the prosperity of Wang Burapha area in the past

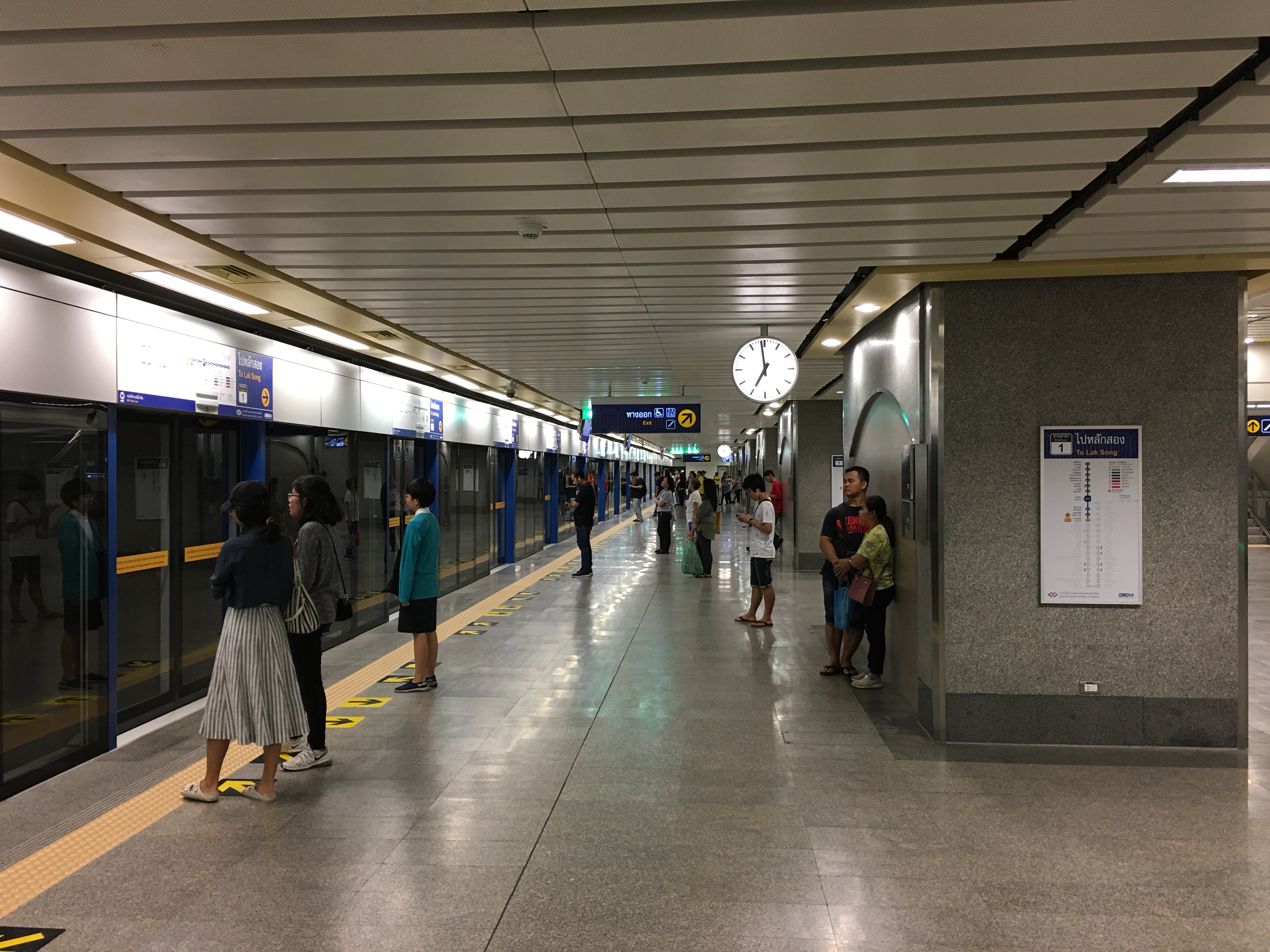
Platform 1 towards Lak Song station

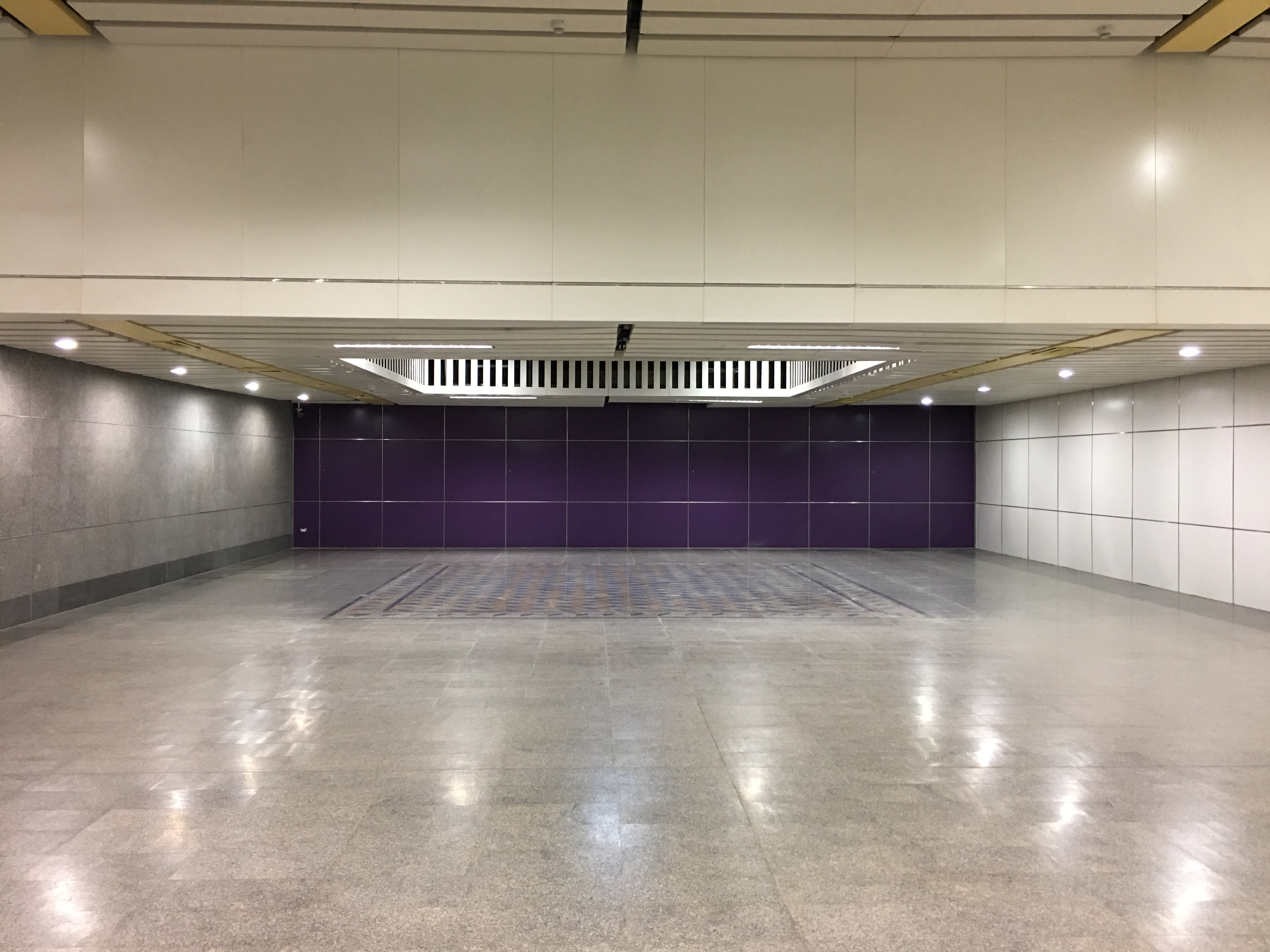
Transfer hall at Sam Yot station. It was built in preparation of the Purple Line southern extension.
