= Sanam Chai =

Sanam Chai may refer to:

สนามชัย

- Sanam Chai Subdistrict in Tha Mai District, Chanthaburi
- Sanam Chai Subdistrict in Bang Sai District (1404), Phra Nakhon Si Ayutthaya
- Sanam Chai Subdistrict in Sathing Phra District, Songkhla
- Sanam Chai Subdistrict in Mueang Suphan Buri District
- Khlong Sanam Chai, a canal in Bangkok

สนามไชย

- Sanam Chai Road, a road in Bangkok
  - Sanam Chai MRT station, which serves the area
