= Sam Yot =

Road intersection in Bangkok, Thailand

Coordinates: 13°44′13″N 100°30′11.55″E

- สามยอด
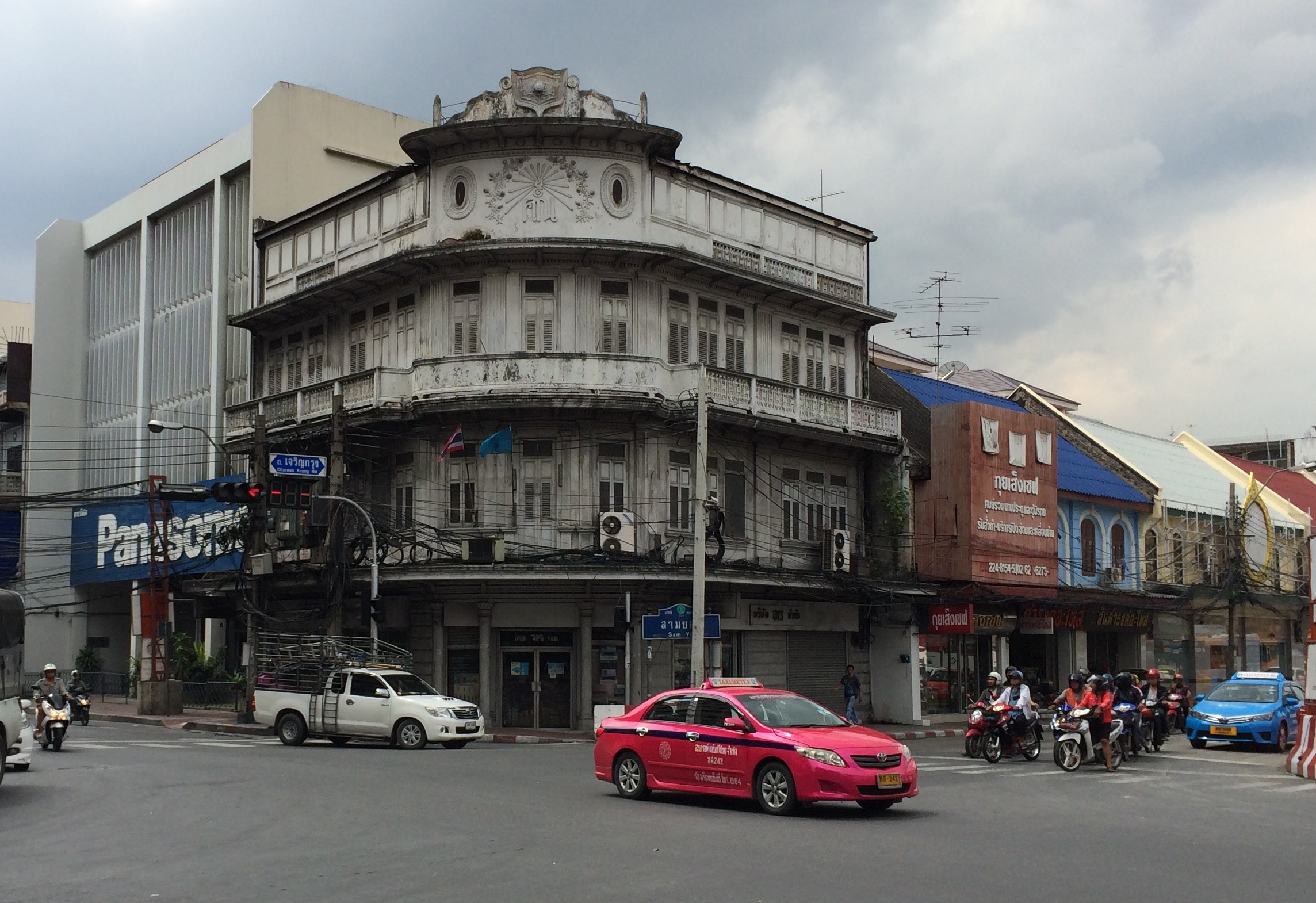
- Sam Yot in 2014 before the construction Sam Yot Station
- Interactive map of Sam Yot

Location
- Wang Burapha Phirom, Phra Nakhon, Bangkok, Thailand
- Roads at junction: Maha Chai (north–south); Charoen Krung (west–east)

Construction
- Type: Four-way at-grade intersection

Sam Yot (Thai: สามยอด, pronounced [sǎːm jɔ̂ːt]) is a four-way intersection of Charoen Krung and Maha Chai Roads in the area of Wang Burapha Phirom Subdistrict, Phra Nakhon District, Bangkok, and also as the name of the surrounding its location.

Originally, it was the location of one of the outer gates of the Royal Grand Palace that was built since the reign of King Phutthayotfa Chulalok (Rama I) during early Rattanakosin period. This gate made of wood named "Pheutthibat" (ประตูพฤฒิบาศ, [praˈtuː pʰrɯt.tʰi.baːt]).

Later, in the reign of King Chulalongkorn (Rama V), when it was in a poor shape and transportation through the gate was extremely difficult. The king ordered a new one to be built to replace the dilapidated Pheutthibat Gate. The new gate was made of cement and had three gateways, the middle was the largest to allow passage on Charoen Krung Road, and the smaller side gateways to serve as a walkway for people to enter and exit. The summit of the three was dominated by a spire, hence came the name "Sam Yot", which literally means "three-peaked gate" by local dwellers.

Not long later, when Bangkok was growing, therefore had to expand the road. The Sam Yot Gate had to be demolished according to the advice of Carlo Allegri, an Italian engineer. The demolition began around the second half of 1897. The gate was most likely located on the eastern side of the intersection.

At that time, Sam Yot considered to be a very active area and also had a status as an amphoe (district) of Phra Nakhon Province (now Bangkok) as well, since it was located near a major commercial districts, Saphan Han and Woeng Nakhon Khasem. It was the location of a legal gambling den, called "Huai Ko Kho" (a type of Thai lottery). The Sam Yot Store was located on the south-west corner of the intersection, and the B Grimm department store was located on the south-east corner of the intersection.

During the reign of King Prajadhipok (Rama VII), Sam Yot were reduced to just tambon (sub-district).

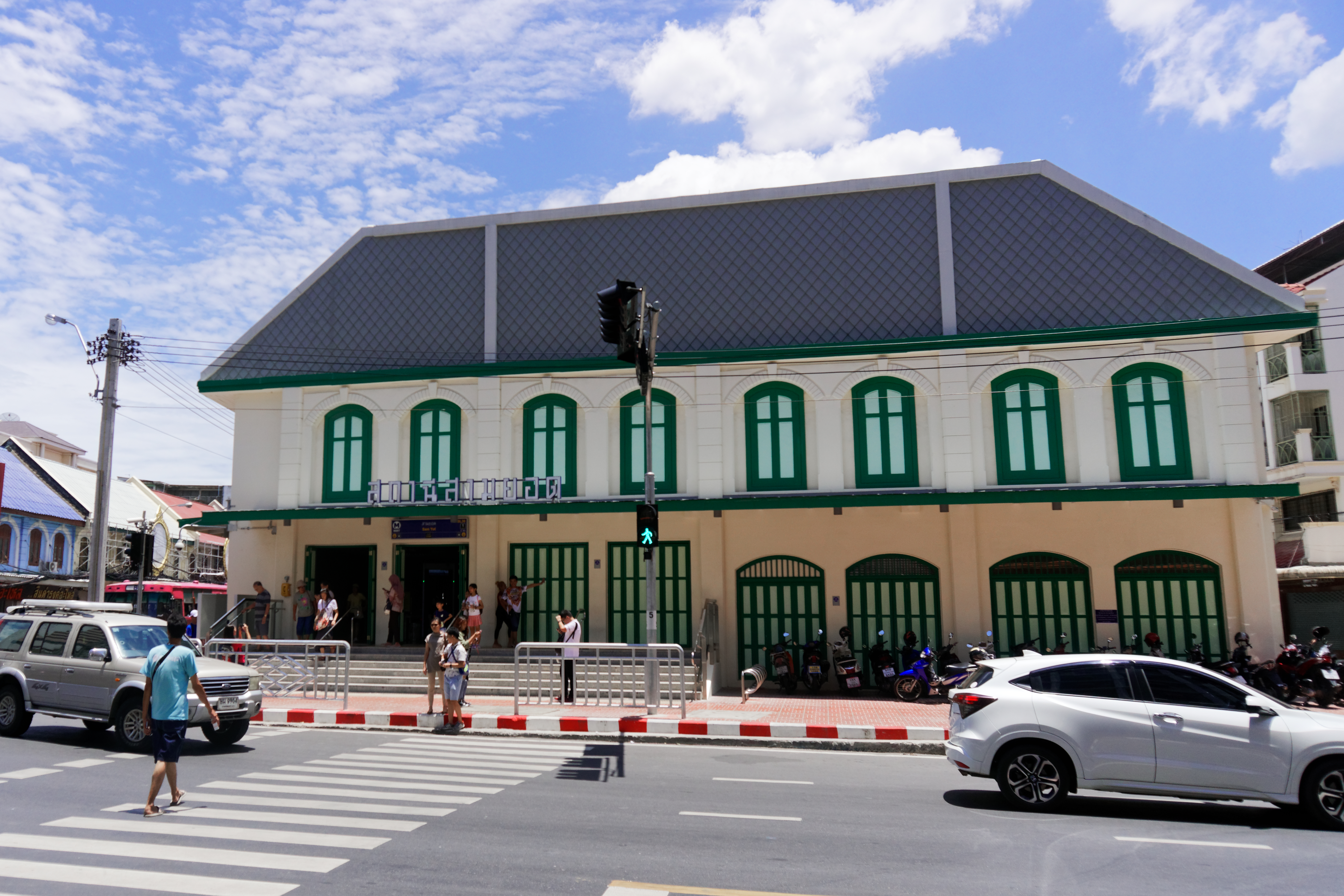
Entry–exit 1 of Sam Yot Station on the Maha Chai Road, at the corner of the instersection

Currently, Sam Yot considered as the fifth intersection of Charoen Krung Road, the first international standard road in Thailand, after Saphan Mon, Si Kak Phraya Si, Chaloem Krung, and Unakan Intersection. It is located near Wang Burapha, Sala Chalermkrung Royal Theatre, Romaneenart Park and Bangkok Corrections Museum. From here, Charoen Krung Road heads to the Damrong Sathit Bridge, more commonly known as Saphan Lek over Khlong Ong Ang on the boundary between Ban Bat Subdistrict, Pom Prap Sattru Phai District (left) and Samphanthawong Subdistrict, Samphanthawong District (right). The next intersection is S.A.B. Intersection.

The area has been served by Sam Yot MRT station of the Blue Line since July 29, 2019. The Blue Line track runs under Charoen Krung Road, which is in Bangkok's old town zone. The design of the ticket vending machine booths is based on three peaks of the gate to unveil a perfect combination of ancient beauty and technological advancement. Construction is underway to extend Purple Line toward this station.
