= Plaeng Nam =

Street in Bangkok, Thailand

Coordinates: 13°44′30.85″N 100°30′37.66″E

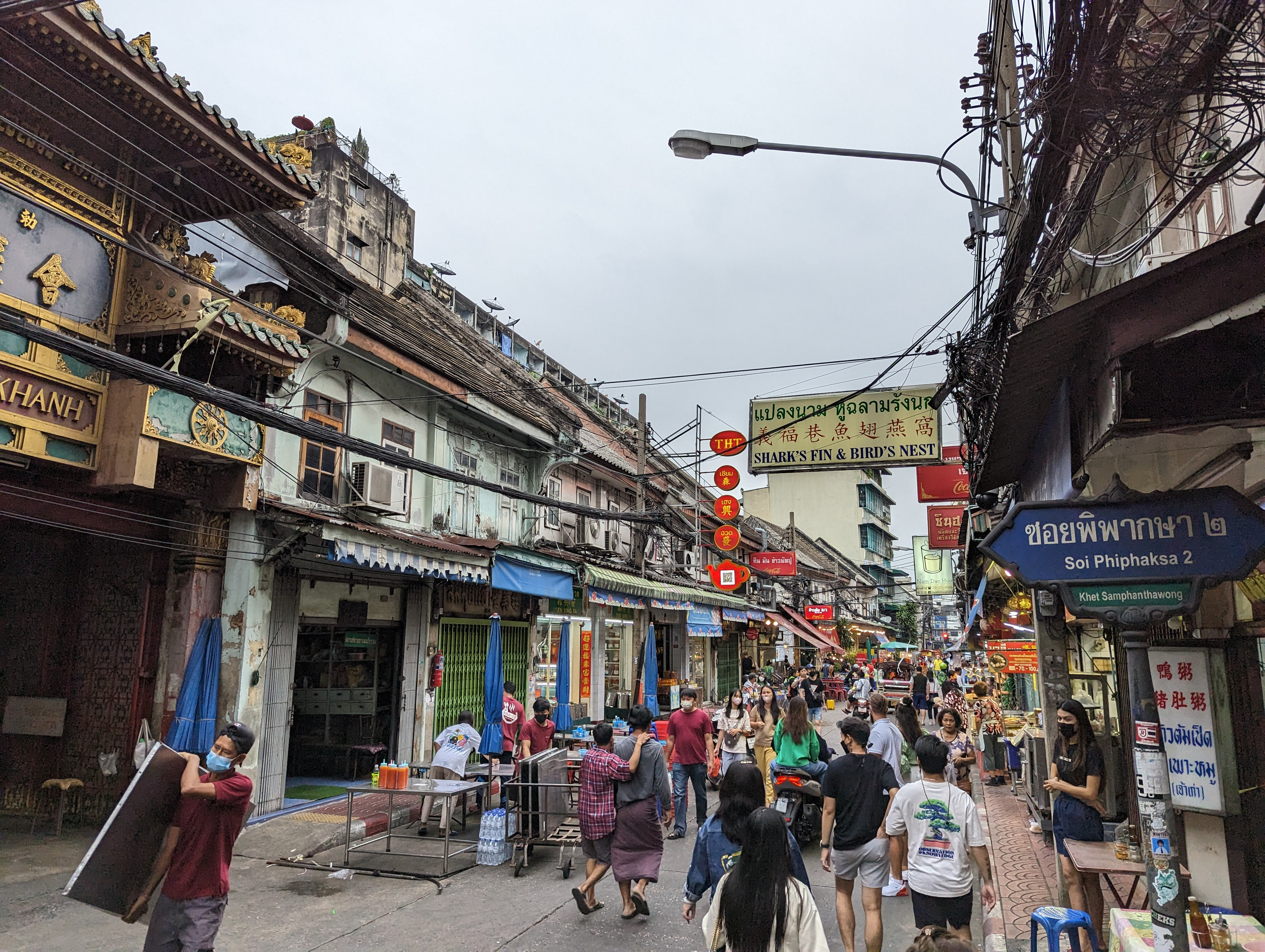
Plaeng Nam in 2022

Plaeng Nam (Thai: แปลงนาม, pronounced [plɛ̄ːŋ nāːm]) is the name of a road branching off from Charoen Krung to Yaowarat Roads in the area of Bangkok's Chinatown. It also includes an eponymous four-way intersection where it meets Charoen Krung and Phlapphla Chai Roads. This intersection is regarded as the starting point of Phlapphla Chai, while the next intersection on the Charoen Krung side is Mo Mi.

Plaeng Nam is about 100 m (328.1 ft). In the past, it was a place for locals to dump garbage because it was close to the wet market. Therefore, it had a foul and dirty condition, and the area was once called "Trok Pacha Ma Nao" (ตรอกป่าช้าหมาเน่า, [trɔ̂ːk pàː chá māː náw], lit. 'lane of carrion graveyard'). During the reign of King Prajadhipok (Rama VII), the city conditions were improved, including various utilities. The King then gave the official name "Plaeng Nam" for auspiciousness, which can be literally translated as "renaming".

Today, this alley is lined on both sides with small two-story shophouses, which host eateries such as noodles, pork stomach and duck porridge available 24/7 à la carte, cafés, shark fin soup and bird's nest soup stalls, shumai stall, Chinese pastry shops, and Chinese sausage stalls. There is also a Vietnamese temple named "Wat Mongkol Samakhom" (Vietnamese: Chùa Hội Khánh), along with shops selling antique tin kerosene lamps and traditional Chinese musical instruments. As of 2024, every weekend on Friday, Saturday, and Sunday from 4:00 pm to 9:00 pm, the alley comes alive as a colourful and lively walking street at night.

At the entrance of the alley on the Charoen Krung side is Wat Mangkon Station (BL29), part of the extension of the MRT Blue Line. The station Façade is inspired by Sino-Portuguese architecture which blend the station with the surrounding historic buildings.
