= Wat Mangkon MRT station =

Rapid transit station in Thailand

Coordinates: 13°44′33.45″N 100°30′24.24″E

วัดมังกร Wat Mangkon
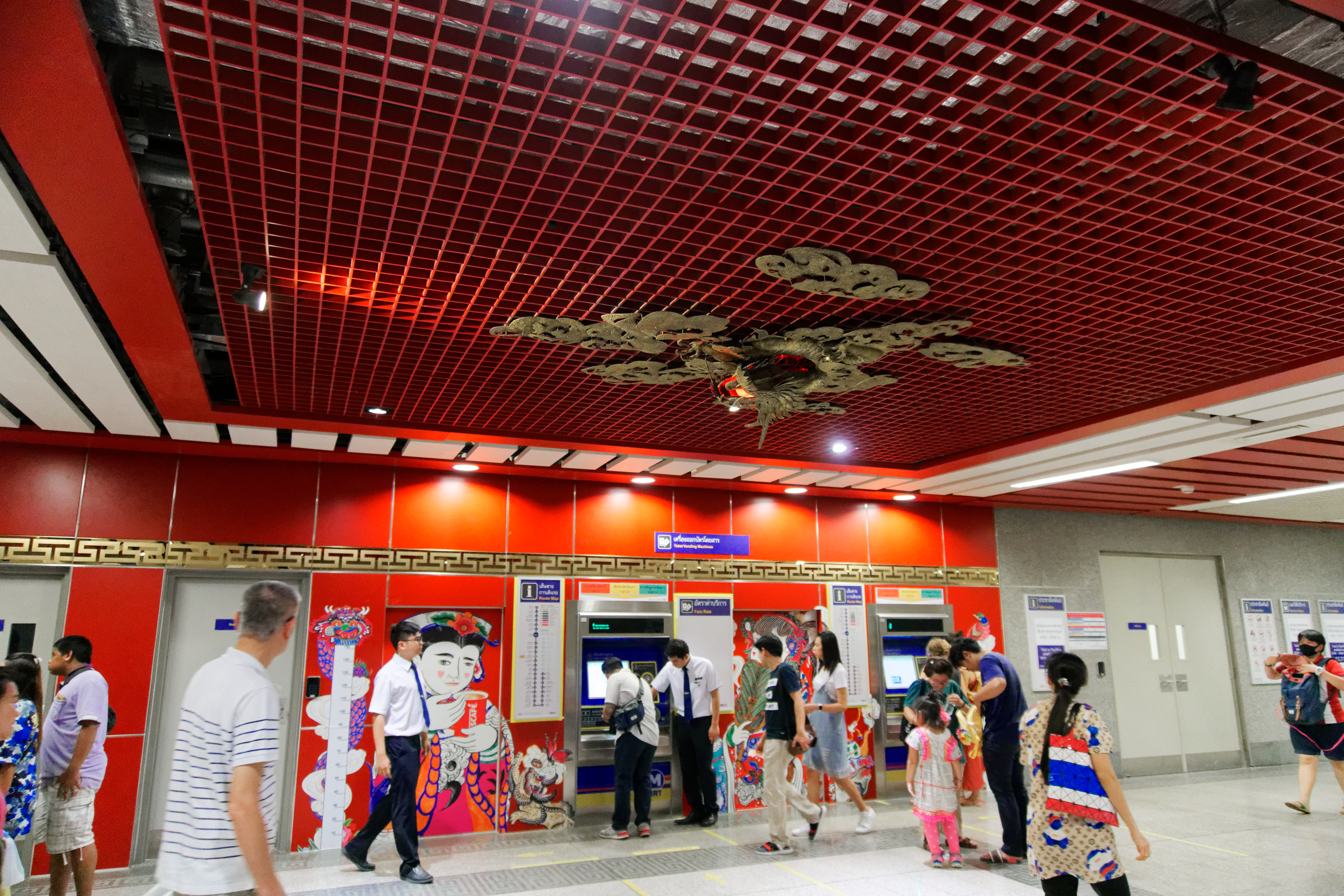
- The vending machines

General information
- Location: Samphanthawong and Pom Prap Subdistricts, Samphanthawong and Pom Prap Sattru Phai Districts, Bangkok, Thailand
- System: MRT
- Owner: Mass Rapid Transit Authority of Thailand (MRTA)
- Operator: Bangkok Expressway and Metro Public Company Limited (BEM)
- Line: MRT MRT Blue Line
- Platforms: 2 side platforms (3 exits, 3 elevators)

Construction
- Structure type: Underground

Other information
- Station code: BL29

History
- Opened: 29 July 2019; 7 years ago

Passengers
- 2021: 2,672,715

Services
Preceding station	Metropolitan Rapid Transit	Following station
Sam Yot towards Lak Song	Blue Line	Hua Lamphong towards Tha Phra via Bang Sue
Location

Wat Mangkon station (Thai: สถานีวัดมังกร, pronounced [sā.tʰǎː.nīː wát māŋ.kɔ̄ːn]) is a Bangkok MRT rapid transit station on the Blue Line, regarded as one of four most beautiful MRT stations; the other three being Itsaraphap station, Sanam Chai station and Sam Yot station. The station is named after Wat Mangkon Kamalawat.

== Location ==
The station is situated right in the middle of the business district of the Chinese-Thais (otherwise known as Bangkok's Chinatown), along with Charoen Krung Road in the vicinity of Plaeng Nam Intersection, and close to Wat Mangkon Kamalawat (otherwise known as Wat Mangkon, or Leng Noei Yi, according to the Teochew dialect), which is a district of unique community culture tied to the history of the Chinese descendants.

It is overlaps between Samphanthawong Subdistrict, Samphanthawong District with Pom Prap Subdistrict, Pom Prap Sattru Phai District, Bangkok.

In addition to being close to Wat Mangkon Kamalawat, the station is also situated near the Mo Mi Junction, Trok Texas, Odeon Circle, Phlapphla Chai Police Station, Poh Teck Tung Foundation, 22 July Circle, and the New Yaowarat Market etc.

== Design ==
Inside station is designed with Sino-Portuguese architecture in mind in order drawn from Wat Mangkon Kamalawat, the interior is decorated with murals of Chinese dragons and water lilies, and to correspond with the name of the station (Wat Mangkon Kamalawat meaning "Temple of Water Lily Dragon"); the ceiling along the descent into head residing inside the station. These were done through the use of red and gold colours, which are all colours of auspiciousness according to Chinese beliefs.

The station is part of Nescafe Blend and Brew's Interactive Art Station Program in commemoration of its 46 years of business in Thailand.

Wat Mangkon Station Traditional sign

== Station layout ==
G Ground floor	Street level	Bus stop, Yaowarat Road, Wat Mangkon Kamalawat
B1; Concourse	Concourse Level	Exits 1–3, and Ticket Vending Machines
B2; Platform	Platform 2	Blue towards Tha Phra via Bang Sue (Hua Lamphong)
B2; Platform	Side platform, doors will open on the right
B4; Platform	Platform 1	Blue towards Lak Song (Sam Yot)
B4; Platform	Side platform, doors will open on the left

== Gallery ==
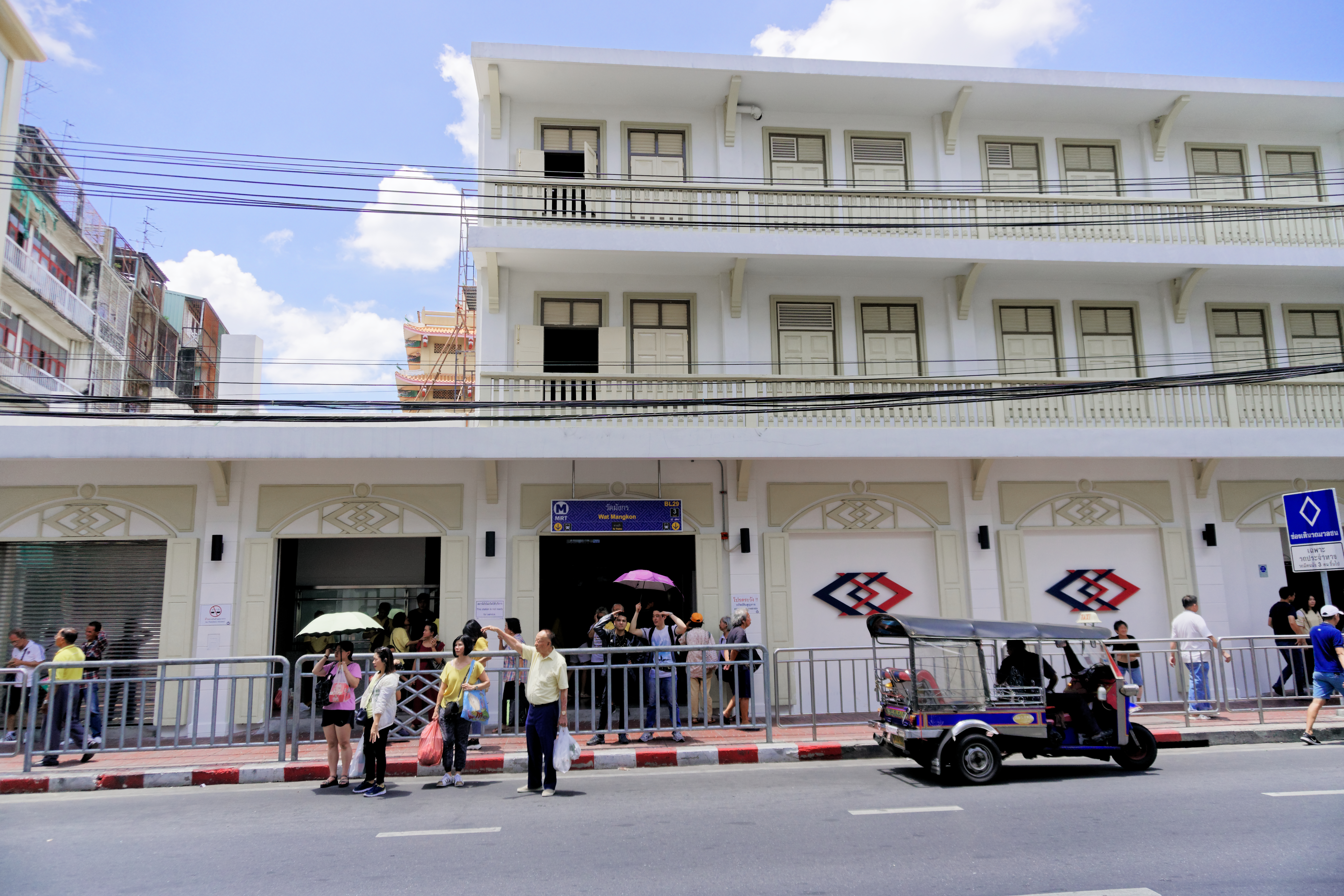
Front of station in Pom Prap side

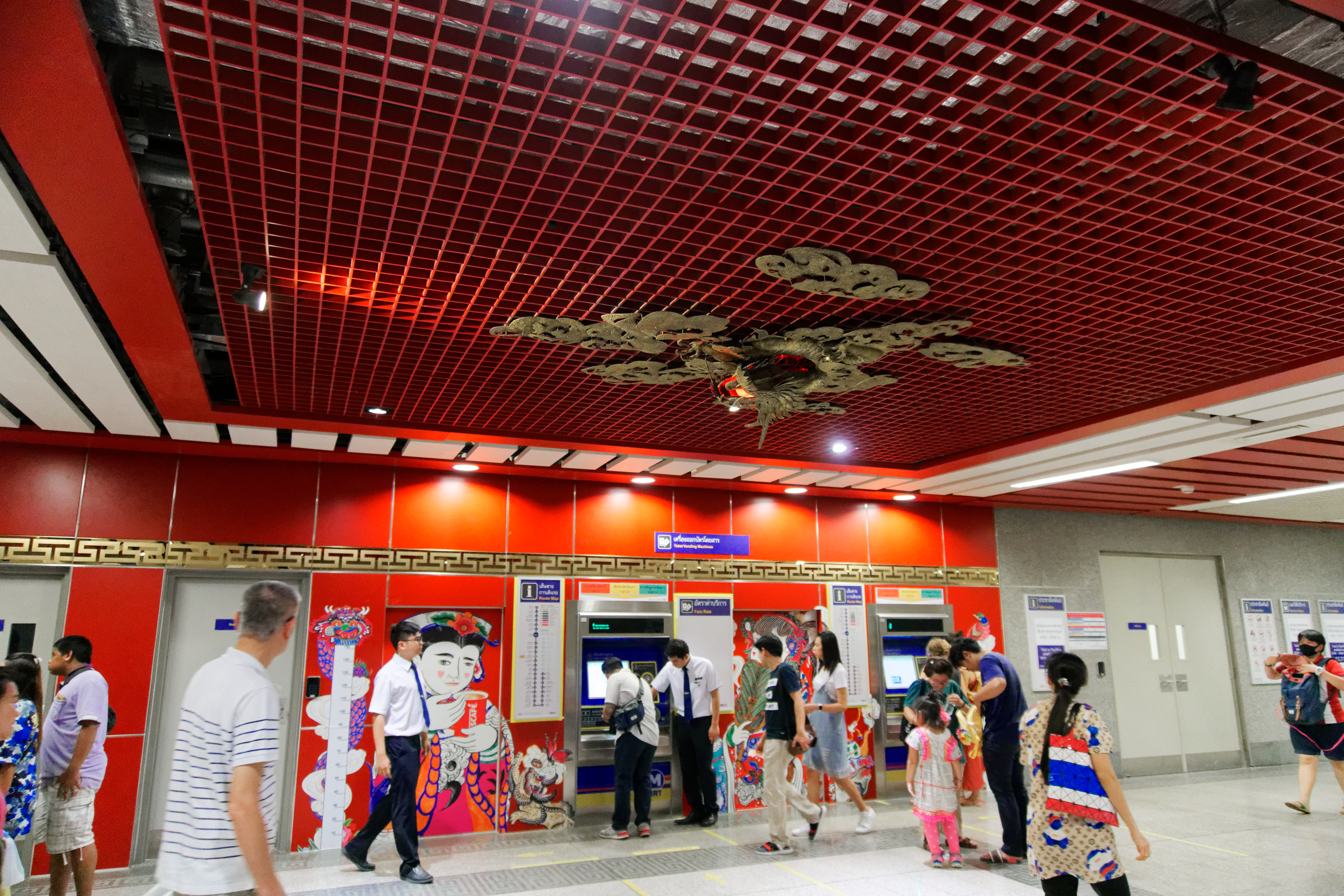
The vending machines

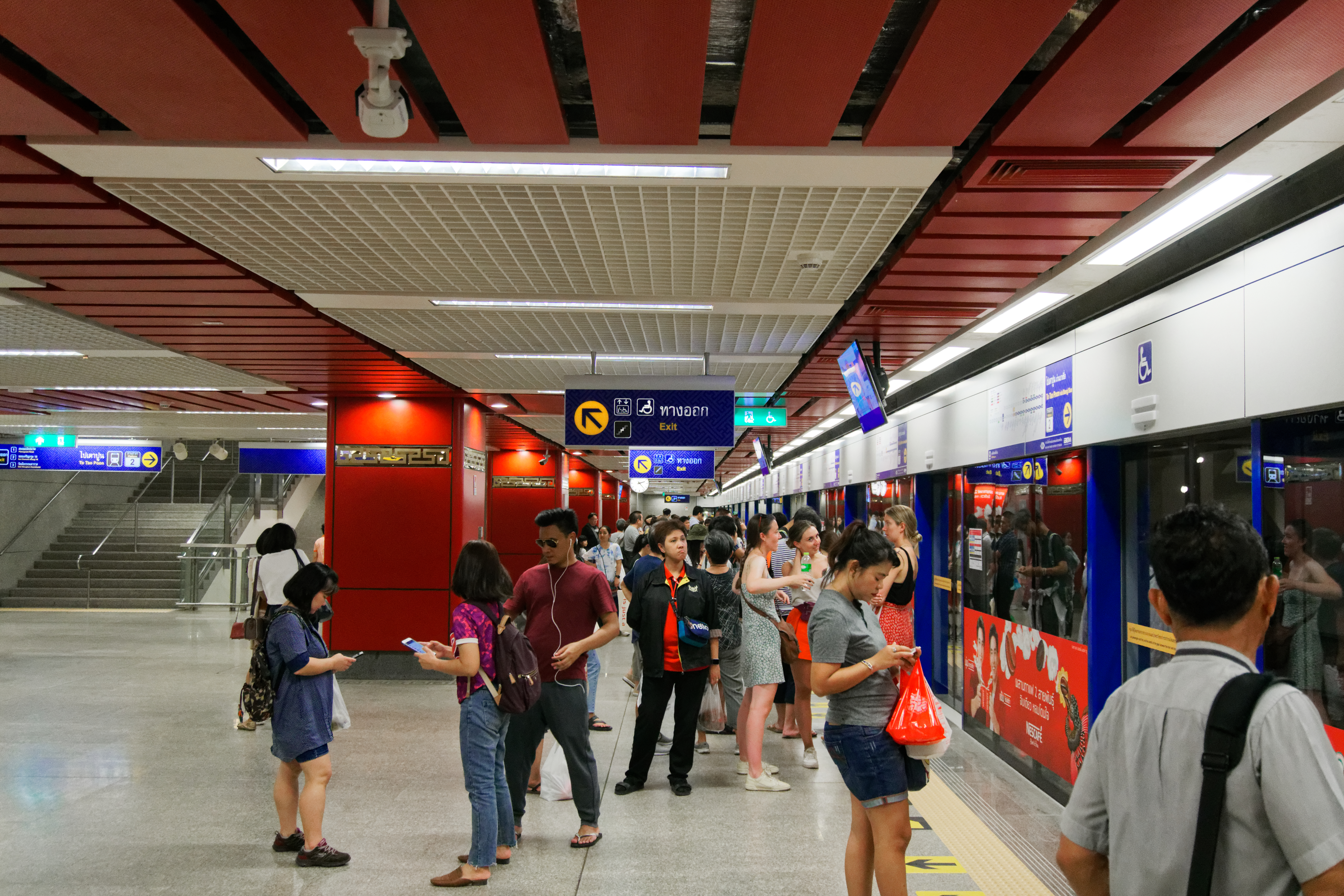
Platform 2 to Tha Phra station (via Bang Sue station)

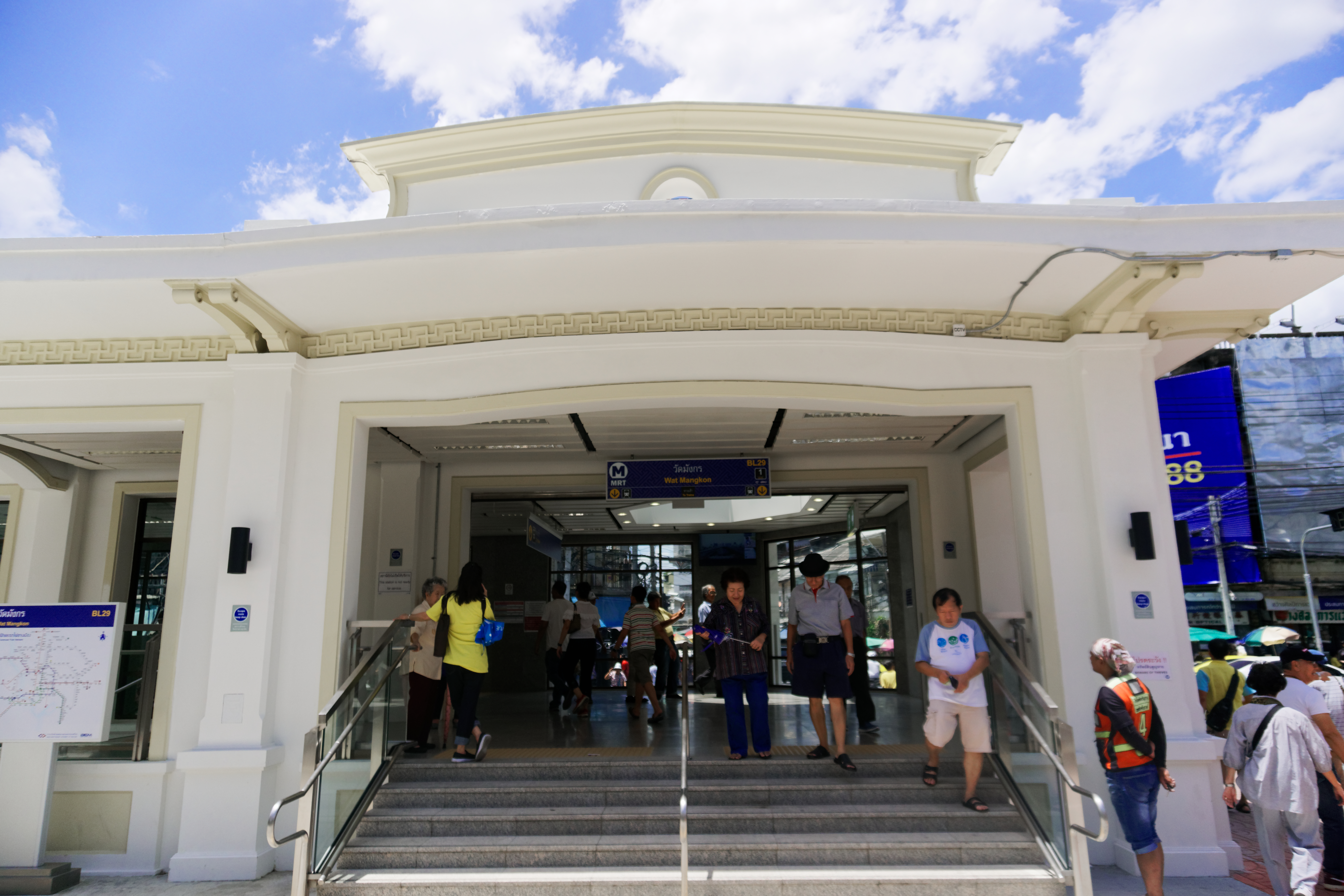
Entry 1 on Plaeng Nam Road

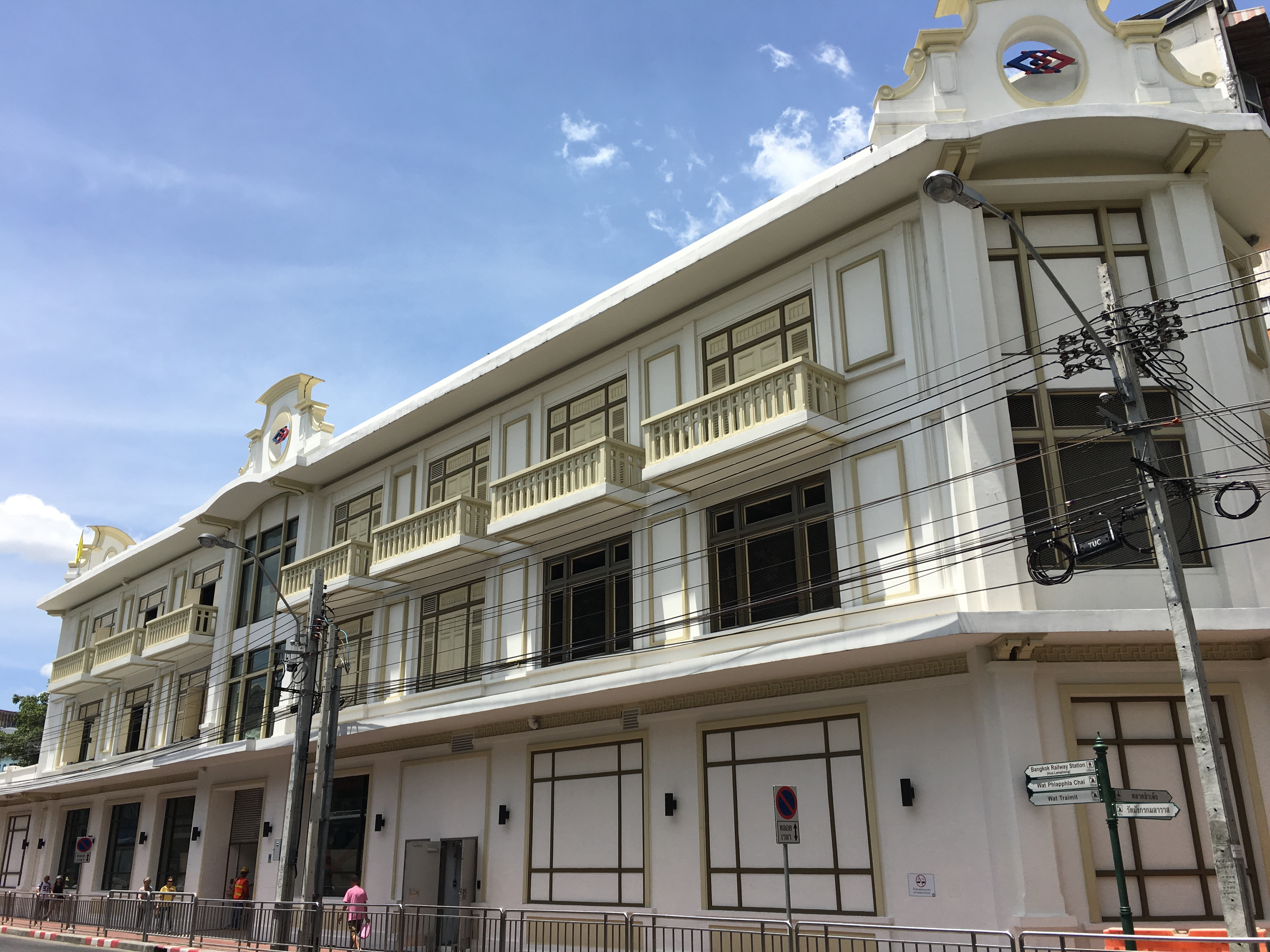
The station building on the Samphanthawong side (next to the Plaeng Nam Road)

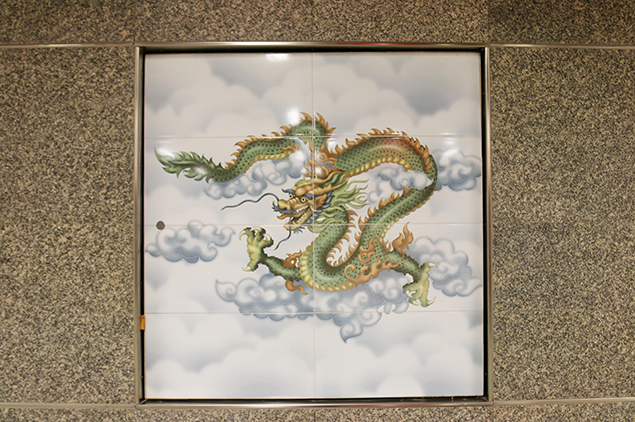
Dragon motif

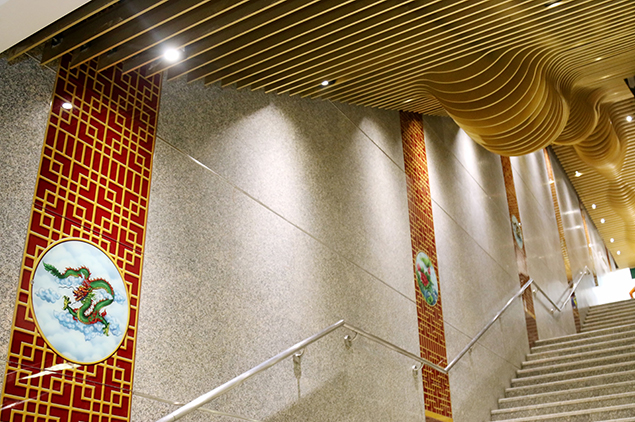
The ceiling has also been designed such as if the passengers are walking inside a dragon's belly

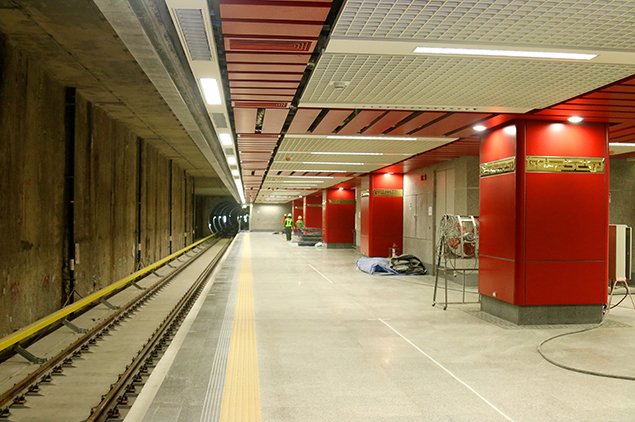
Platform while under construction
