= Sanam Chai MRT station =

Bangkok rapid transit station

สนามไชย Sanam Chai
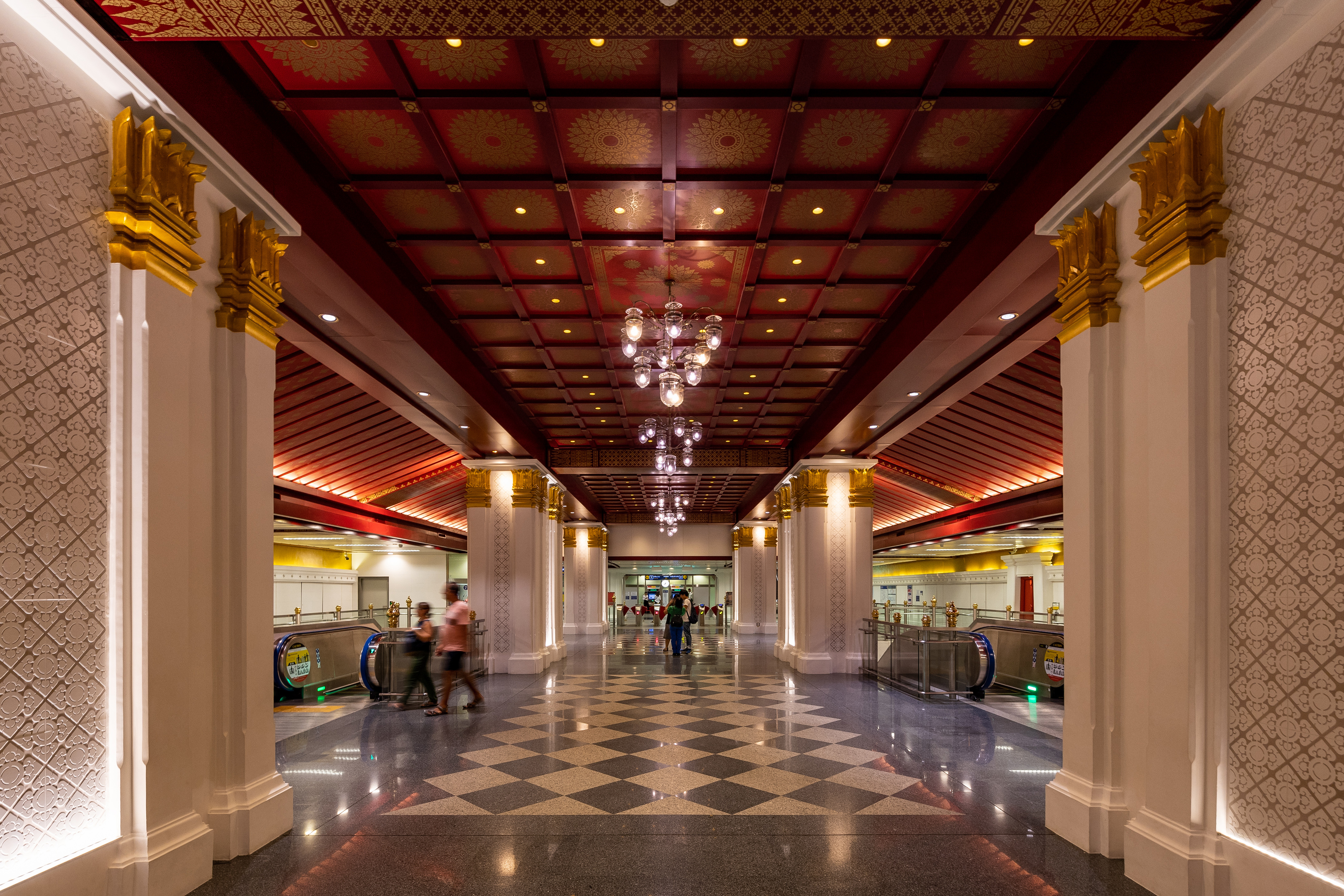

General information
- Location: Phra Borom Maha Ratchawang Subdistrict, Phra Nakhon District, Bangkok, Thailand
- Coordinates: 13°44′38″N 100°29′41.1″E
- System: MRT
- Owner: Mass Rapid Transit Authority of Thailand (MRTA)
- Operator: Bangkok Expressway and Metro Public Company Limited (BEM)
- Line: MRT MRT Blue Line
- Platforms: 1 island platform (5 exits, 2 elevators)
- Connections: Chao Phraya Express Boat services

Construction
- Structure type: Underground

Other information
- Station code: BL31

History
- Opened: 29 July 2019; 7 years ago

Passengers
- 2021: 877,862

Services
Preceding station	Metropolitan Rapid Transit	Following station
Itsaraphap towards Lak Song	Blue Line	Sam Yot towards Tha Phra via Bang Sue
Location

Sanam Chai station (Thai: สถานีสนามไชย, RTGS: Sathani Sanam Chai, pronounced [sā.tʰǎː.nīː sā.nǎːm tɕʰāj]) is a Bangkok MRT rapid transit station on the Blue Line. The station is located underground under Sanam Chai Road. During the excavation of the site to build the station, multiple historical artifacts were found, such as coins from the reign of King Mongkut and King Chulalongkorn. These were given to the Fine Arts Department and Museum Siam for preservation and research. An exhibition was planned to display these artifacts at concourse level under Exit 1. This was opened to the public as the first museum in Thailand located underground on 27 November 2020, free of charge.

== Design and location ==
Sanam Chai Station Traditional sign

Sanam Chai station is in the middle of Rattanakosin Island, or Bangkok's old town zone, which is a conservation area and has historical significance. It can be considered as the only station in the inner Rattanakosin Island (around Royal Grand Palace), and regarded as one of only four MRT stations that are recognized for their most beautiful design (consisted of Itsaraphap station, Sanam Chai station, Sam Yot station, and Wat Mangkon station).

The interior is finished under the theme of the early Rattanakosin era, as designed by expert in Thai architecture and national artist Pinyo Suwankiri. The inside is decorated with Sadom pillars (main pillar), these are etched with tiles carve into the shape of the Pikul flower sharpe, which signify prosperity, with the pillar edges adorn with blooming lotus shapes, with long curve petals leaning toward the centre, the bottom of each large petals engrave with smaller petals and coated in gold leaf. The floor and walls made of resemble the city walls. The ceiling painted with star sharpe stencils to resemble the atmosphere of the throne hall in Rattanakosin era. The station has a higher ceiling than most MRT stations along the line as the ventilation system was installed to the side of the station instead of directly above it.

Entry-exit 1 has been specifically designed by CH.Karnchang, PLC. without a roof and with specially designed escalators, in order to not obscure the view of Museum Siam located behind the exit.

In addition to being in the middle of the Rattanakosin Island, the station is also near Wat Pho, Saranrom Park, Saranrom Palace, Museum Siam, Pak Khlong Talat, Rajini School, Wat Ratchabopit, Wat Rajabopit School, Wat Ratchapradit, etc.

== Station layout ==
G Ground floor	-	Bus stop, Museum Siam
B1; Basement	Basement	Exits 1–5
B2; Concourse	Concourse	Ticket machines
B4; Platform	Platform 2	Blue towards Tha Phra via Bang Sue (Sam Yot)
B4; Platform	Island platform, doors will open on the right
B4; Platform	Platform 1	Blue towards Lak Song (Itsaraphap)

== Gallery ==
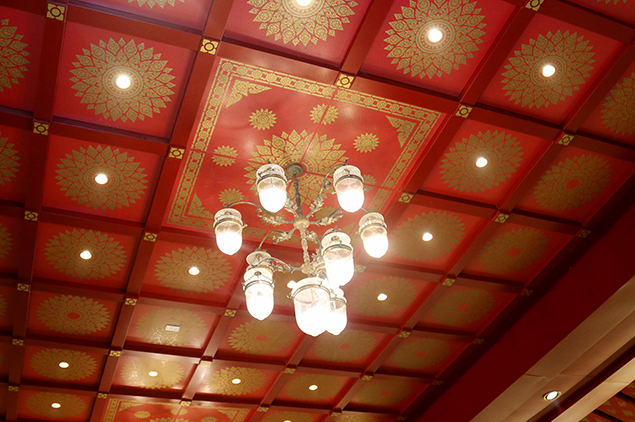
Thai style chandelier

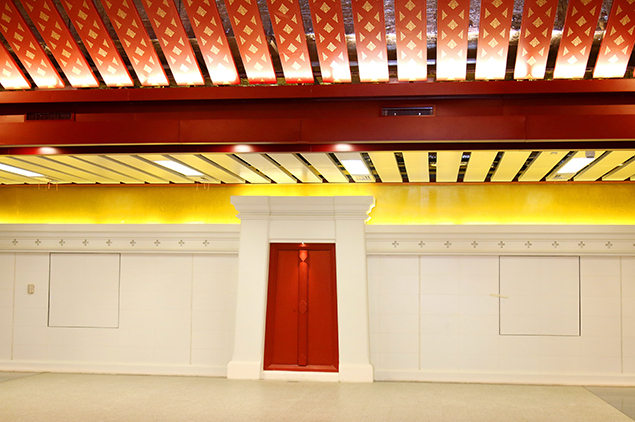
City gate replica

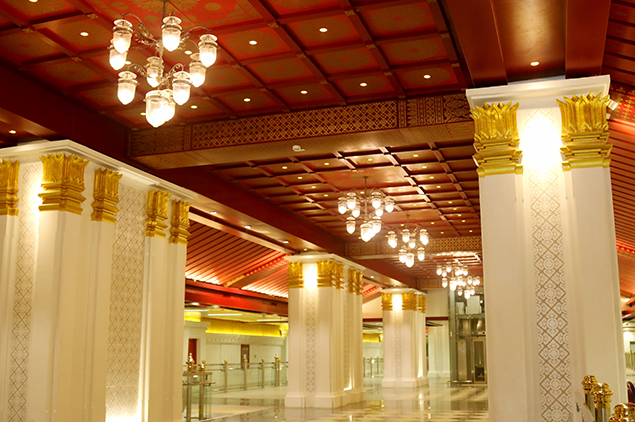
Sadom pillars

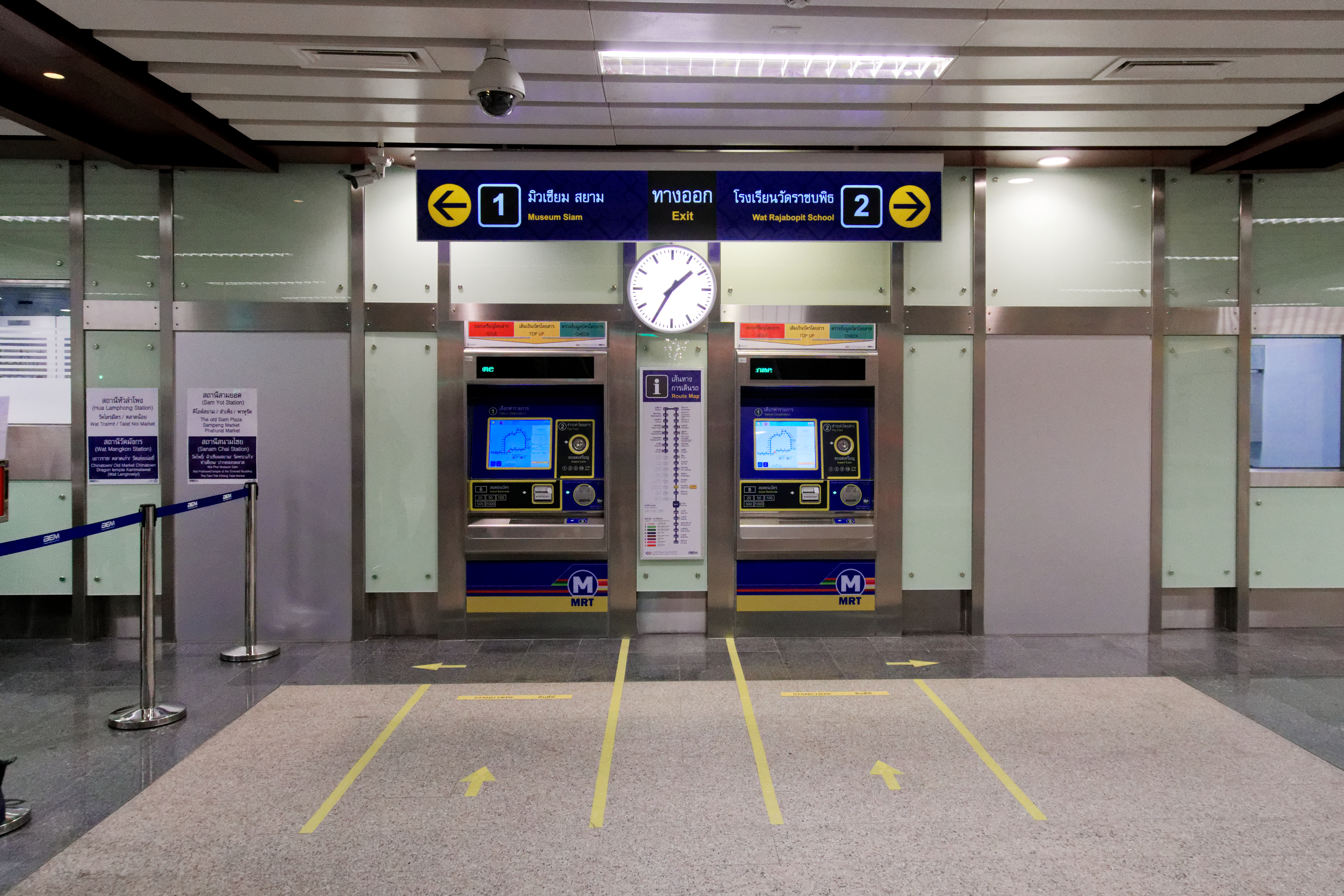
Ticket vending machines

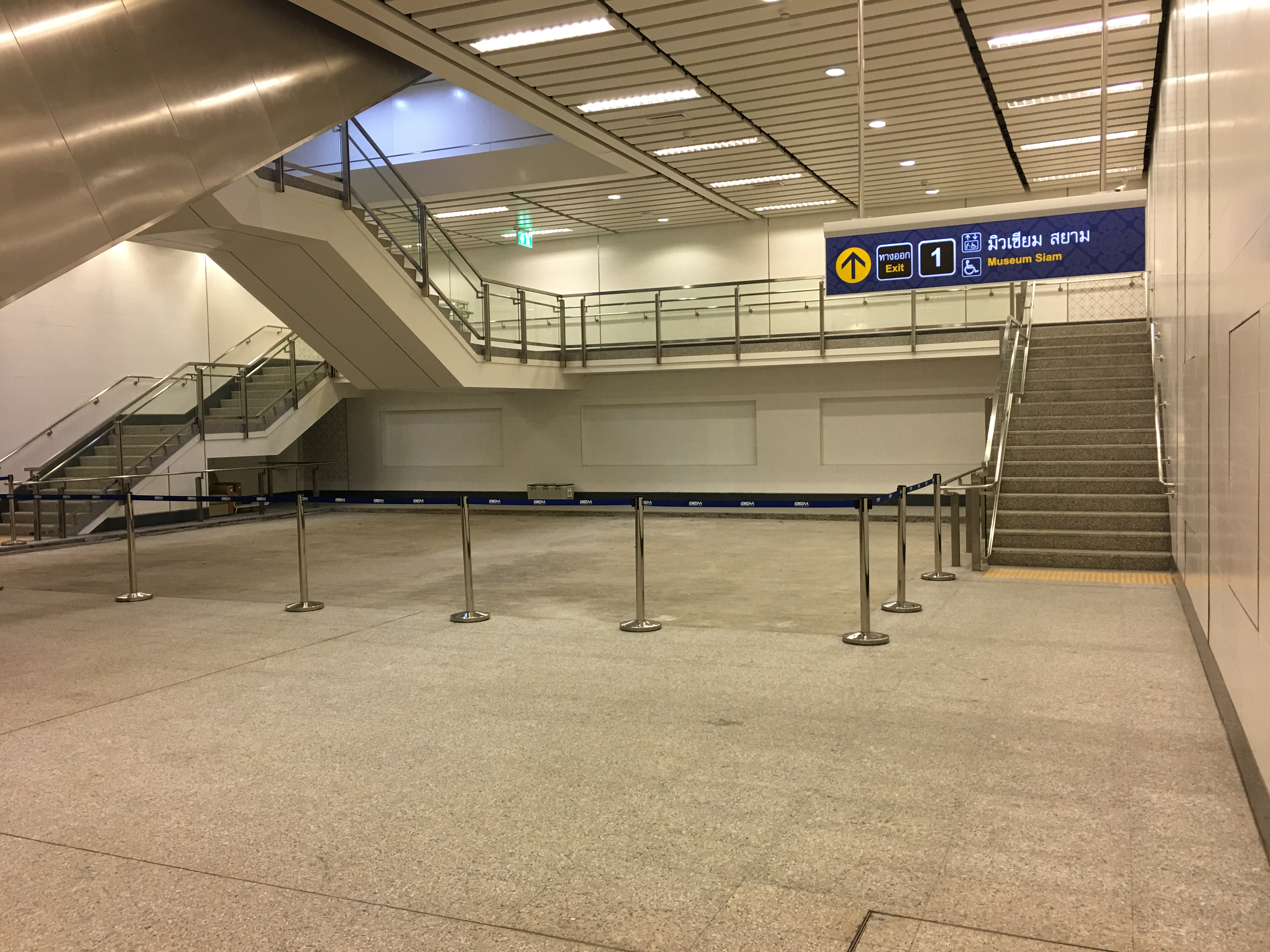
Future space planned for artifact exhibition

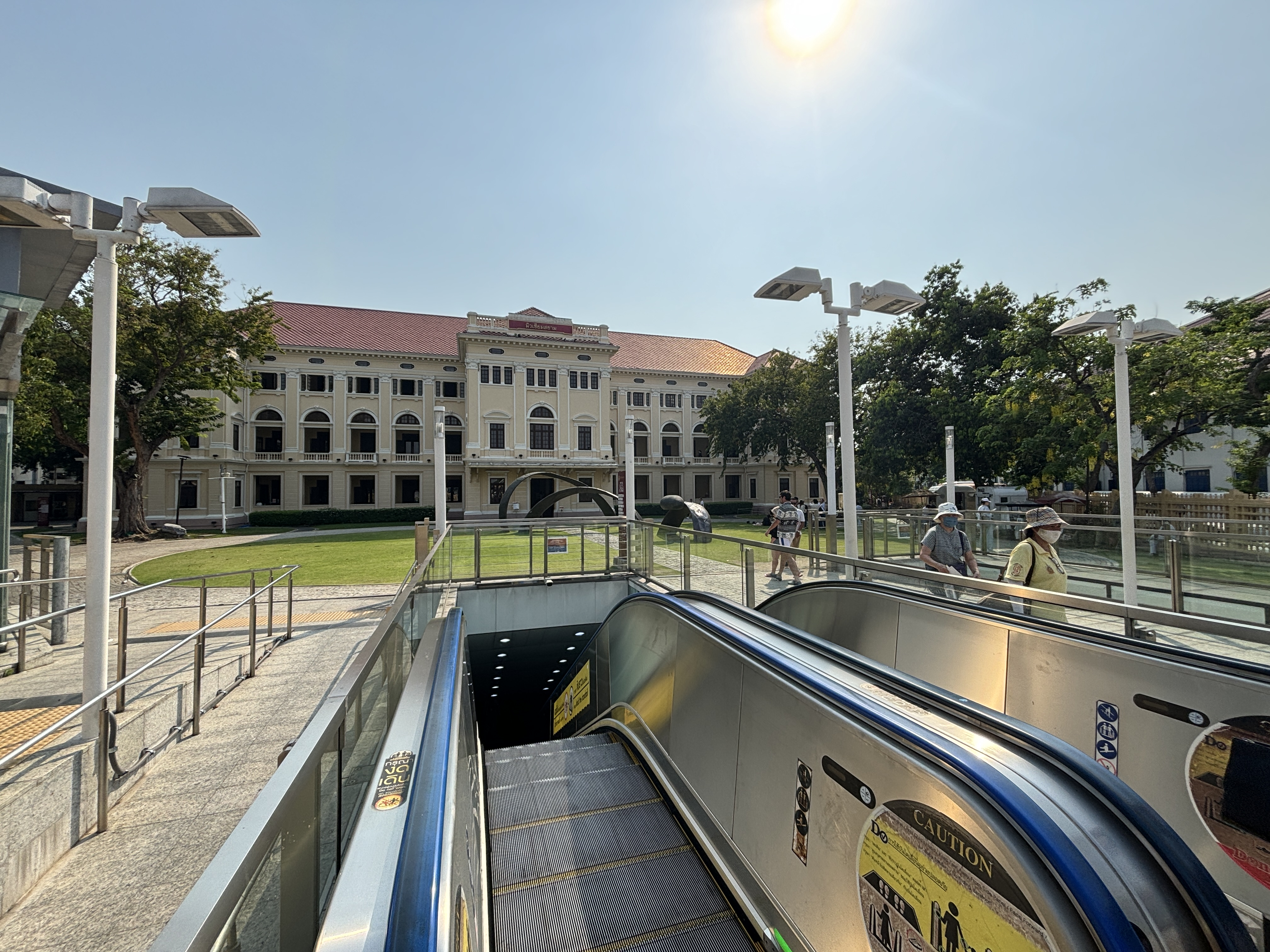
Exit 1 in front of the Museum Siam

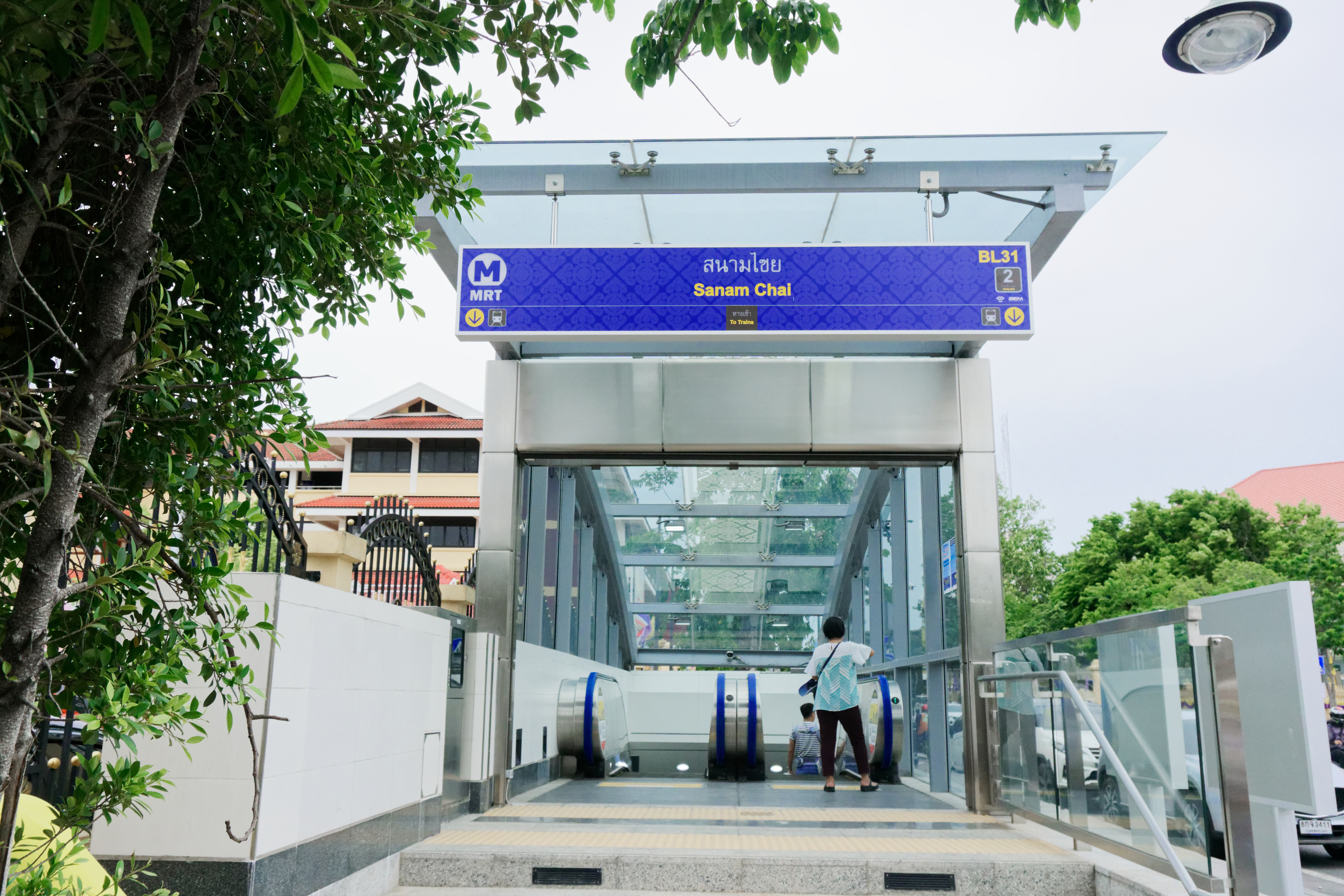
Exit 2

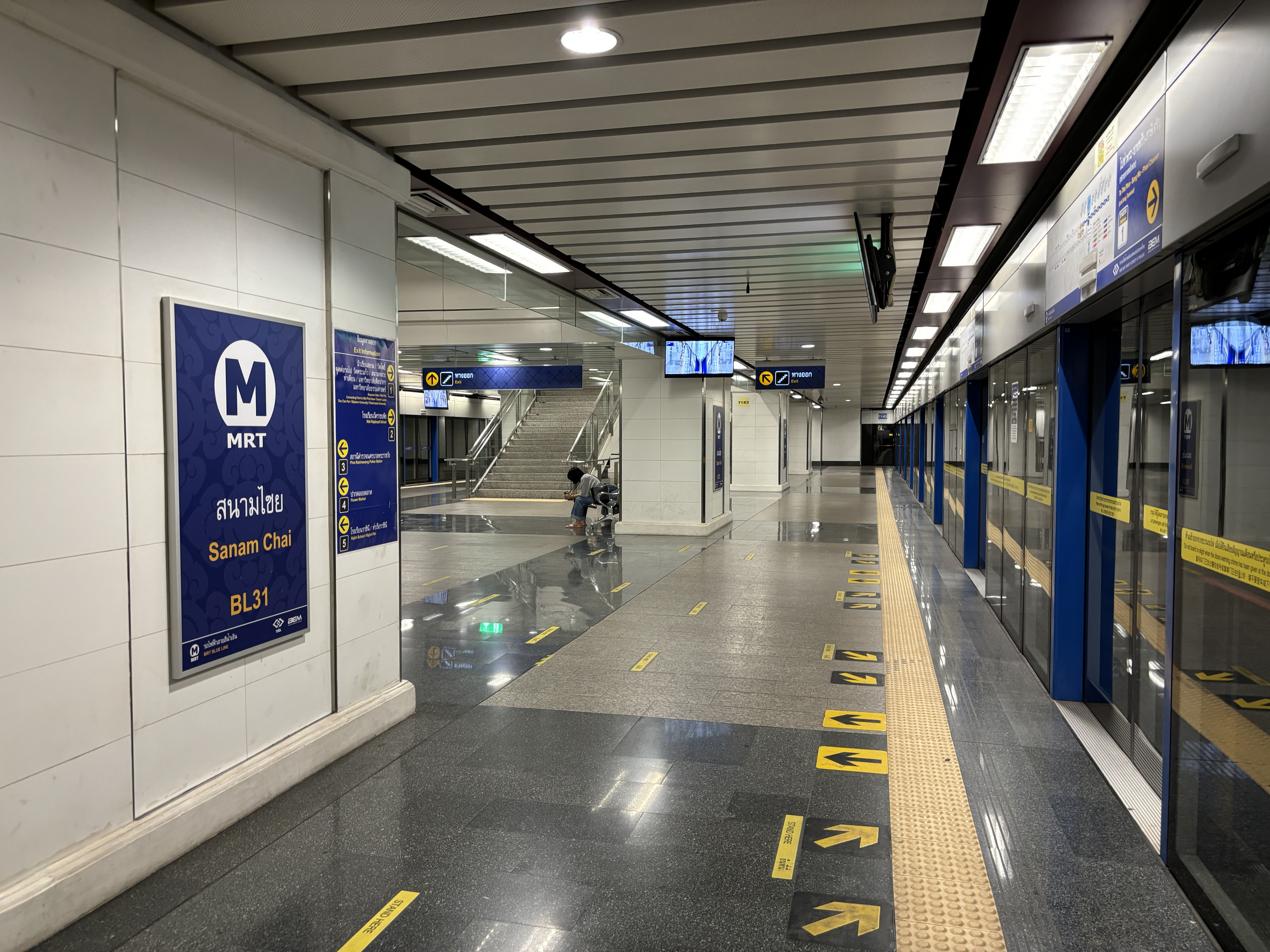
Platform

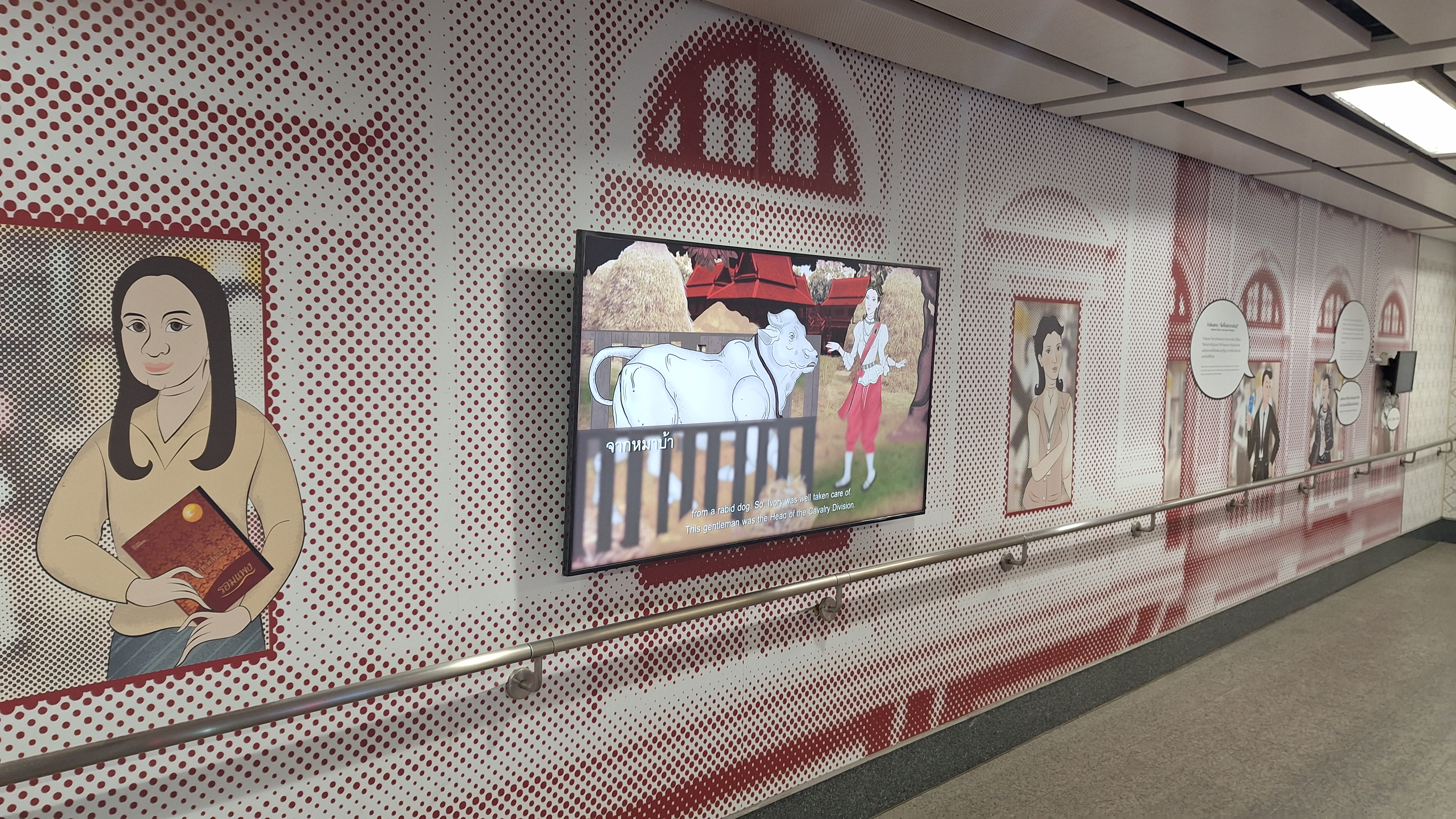
Video media in station museum area.

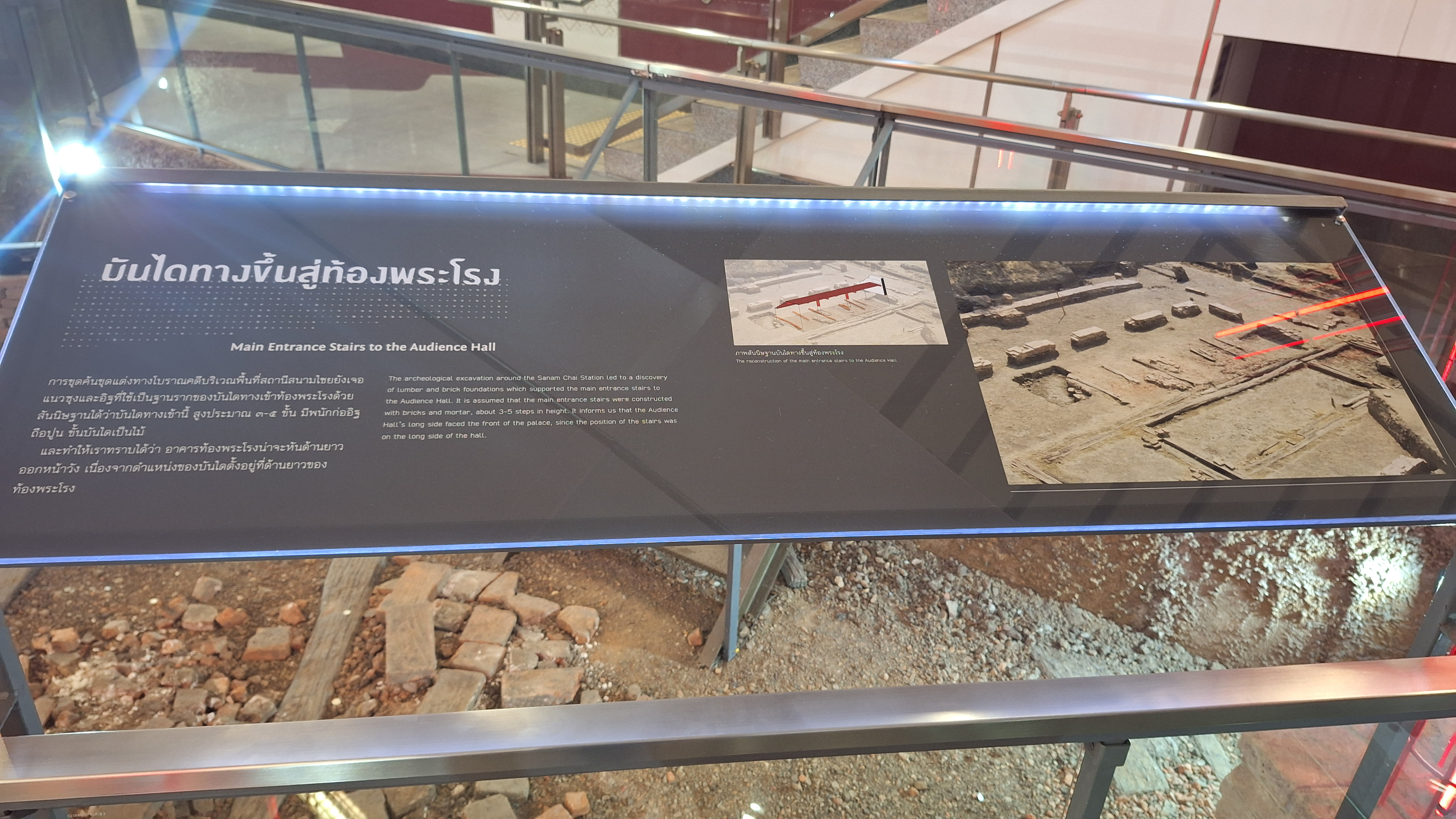
Ancient ruins in station museum area.
