= Unakan Road =

Street in Phra Nakhon, Thailand

Coordinates: 13°44′49.48″N 100°30′03.88″E

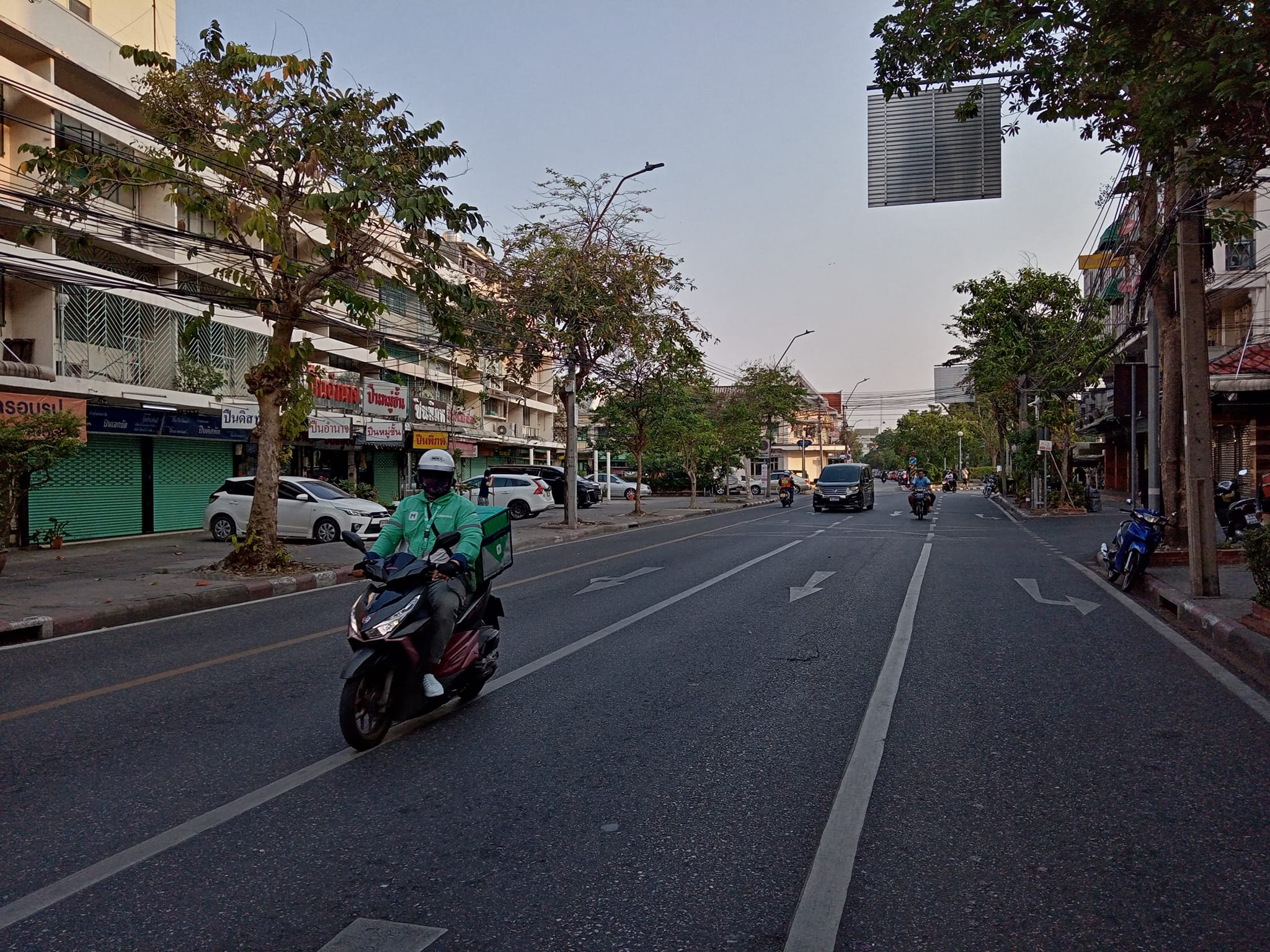
Unakan Road view towards Wat Suthat and Rommaninat Park

Unakan Road (Thai: ถนนอุณากรรณ, RTGS: Thanon Unakan, pronounced [tʰā.nōn ʔū.nāː.kān]) is a short road located on Rattanakosin Island, or Bangkok's old town zone. It begins at the Unakan Intersection, (Note: The corner where the Bangkok Bank, Sam Yot Branch, now stands was once the site of the first firearms shop in the Wang Burapha. It was operated by the Muslim Sicharun brothers, who later became members of the Khana Ratsadon; the group that staged the 1932 revolution which transformed Thailand's system of government. Historical accounts suggest that some of the weapons used during the revolution were acquired from this very shop.) where it meets Charoen Krung and Burapha Roads, opposite The Old Siam Plaza in the Wang Burapha area. From there, it runs directly north, parallel to Wat Suthat and Siriphong Road, and ends at the corner of the Giant Swing. The total length of the road is 446 m (1,463 ft).

The road was built by royal command of King Mongkut (Rama IV) in memory of Prince Unakan Ananta Norajaya, his son with Consort Piam Sucharitakul (later Princess Piyamavadi), who once resided in this area. The young prince died at the age of 17 in 1873. After his death, his mother donated 8,000 baht to fund a public utility for the benefit of travelers. The Department of Sanitation (now the Department of Public Works) completed the road's construction in 1900, and it was officially named by King Chulalongkorn (Rama V). At that time, it was considered a shortcut connecting Charoen Krung and Bamrung Mueang Roads.

In the early 20th century, the area around the road was used for trading charcoal, which was transported by boat along Khlong Lot Wat Ratchabophit, a canal branching off from the old city moat, Khlong Khu Mueang Doem. This led to the area being called "Saphan Than" (สะพานถ่าน, lit. 'charcoal bridge').

The Saphan Than area extended to nearby Ti Thong Road and included three short alley-like streets: Soi Na Wang, Long Tha Road, and Soi Sa Song. The prince's former residence, known as Wang Saphan Than (วังสะพานถ่าน, lit. 'Saphan Than Palace'), was demolished and replaced with a two-story market named Bampen Bun before World War II. The market thrived through the 1950s and 1960s, during the peak of the Wang Burapha commercial district. In addition to being a wet market selling various goods, it was also known as a location for prostitution.

By the 1970s, when Wang Burapha's popularity began to fade, Bampen Bun Market was demolished and redeveloped into the Bampenbun Flat apartment complex and the shophouses that stand there today.
