= Bus No. 53 (Bangkok) =

Bus route in Bangkok, Thailand

2-9 (53)

Overview
- Operator: The Bangkok Mass Transit Authority (BMTA)

Route
- Start: Thewet Bridge (clockwise route); Sanam Luang (counterclockwise route)
- Via: Nang Loeng Market; Bobae Market; 22 July Circle; Hua Lamphong MRT; Wat Traimit; Bangkok's Chinatown MRT; Pak Khlong Talat MRT; Bang Lamphu; Wisut Kasat Road
- End: Thewet Bridge (clockwise route); Sanam Luang (counterclockwise route)
- Length: 15.2 km (9.4 mi) (clockwise route); 12 km (7.5 mi) (counterclockwise route)

Service
- Level: Daily
- Frequency: 5–15 minutes
- Operates: 05:00 am–10:30 pm

Bangkok Bus Line 2-9 (53) (clockwise route) stops at the terminal near Thewet Bridge

Bus No. 53, currently designated Bus No. 2-9 (53) under the post-reform bus numbering system, is a bus route in Bangkok operated directly by the Bangkok Mass Transit Authority (BMTA). It is under the jurisdiction of Bus Operations District 6. The route is currently served by cream-and-red, non-air-conditioned Isuzu MT111QB buses, which entered service in 1991.

The route has a unique feature: it is the only bus route that operates in a circular loop around Phra Nakhon District and its neighboring districts, encompassing Rattanakosin Island, Bangkok's historic old city. The area is home to numerous important landmarks and historical sites, making Bus No. 53 a sightseeing route of sorts in Bangkok.

== Route ==
Bus No. 53 is divided into two services: a clockwise route and a counterclockwise route. Both services pass through each other's starting points, allowing passengers to travel on either route using a single ticket. As of 2026, the flat fare is 8 baht for the entire journey. The buses operate daily from 5:00 a.m. to 10:30 p.m.

=== Clockwise Route ===
The clockwise service begins at the bus terminal near Thewet Bridge. At each junction, the bus turns right, following a clockwise loop. Along the way, it passes several important landmarks, including Nang Loeng, Bobae and Mahanak markets, Debsirin School, 22 July Circle, Hua Lamphong railway station, Chulalongkorn University Centenary Park, Wat Traimit, Odeon Circle, Yaowarat Road (Bangkok's Chinatown), Sampheng Market, Phahurat, Pak Khlong Talat flower market, Maha Rat Road, Tha Tien, Wat Pho, the Grand Palace, Tha Chang, Tha Phra Chan, Thammasat University, Sanam Luang, the National Theatre, Phra Athit Road, Bang Lamphu, Wan Chat Bridge, Wisut Kasat Road, and the Bank of Thailand. The route then returns to its terminus at Thewet Bridge, covering a total distance of 15.2 km (9.4 mi).

=== Counterclockwise Route ===
The counterclockwise service begins at Sanam Luang, near the Volunteer Soldiers Monument in front of the National Theatre. At each junction, the bus turns left, following a counterclockwise loop. The route passes Thammasat University, Tha Phra Chan, Maha Rat Road, Tha Chang, Wat Pho, the Grand Palace, Tha Tien, Wat Rajabopit School, the Territorial Defense Department's shooting range, Ban Mo, Wang Burapha, Saphan Lek, Woeng Nakhon Khasem, Khlong Thom, Chinatown along Charoen Krung Road, 22 July Circle, Phlapphla Chai Road, Wat Thep Sirin, Bobae, Mahanak and Nang Loeng markets, Thewet Bridge, the Bank of Thailand, and Bang Lamphu. The route then terminates at Sanam Luang, covering a total distance of 12 km (7.5 mi).
