= Maha Rat Road =

Street in Bangkok, Thailand

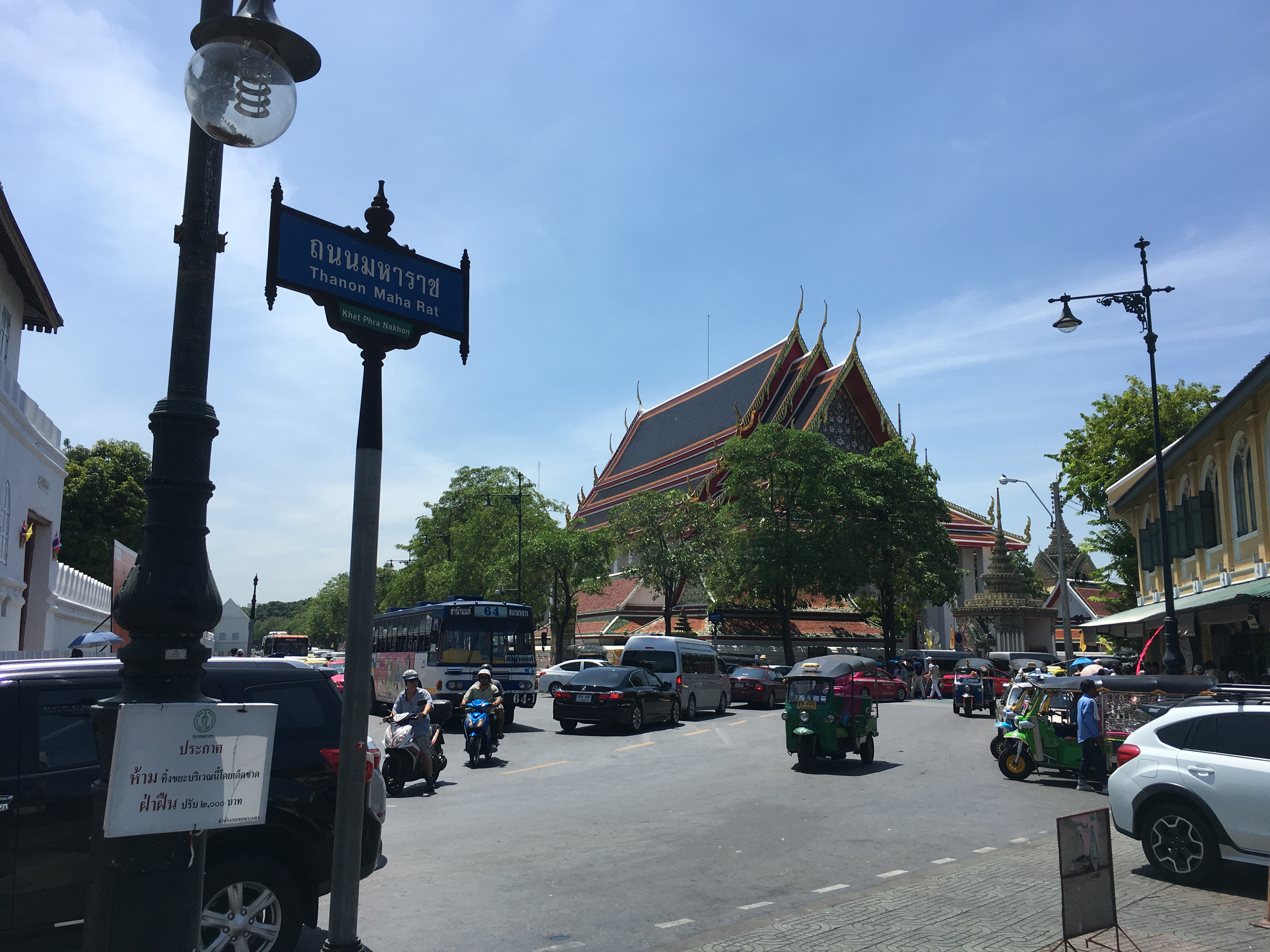
- The street name sign at the entrance to Tha Tian Market
- Interactive map of Maha Rat Road
- Native name: ถนนมหาราช (Thai)
- Length: 1.7 km (1.1 mi)
- Location: Phra Borom Maha Ratchawang, Phra Nakhon, Bangkok
- Postal code: 10200
- Coordinates: 13.749435°N 100.491963°E
- North: Phra Chan Road
- South: Chak Phet Road

Maha Rat Road (Thai: ถนนมหาราช, RTGS: Thanon Maha Rat, pronounced [tʰa.nǒn má.hǎː.râːt]) is a short street, 1.7 km (1.1 mi) long along Chao Phraya River to the southeast. It is located in Phra Borom Maha Ratchawang subdistrict, Phra Nakhon district, Bangkok, Thailand.

The road begins at Phra Chan Road in the Tha Phra Chan area, running alongside the Grand Palace and Wat Pho, and ending at Charoenrat 31 Bridge and Chak Phet Road in the Pak Khlong Talat area.

It is an original road dating back to the founding of Rattanakosin Kingdom. Formerly, it ran along the western wall of the Grand Palace, serving as one of the encircling roads of the palace, similar to Na Phra Lan Road or Sanam Chai Road. At first, it was merely a narrow walkway paved with large perforated bricks. Later, during the reign of King Chulalongkorn (Rama V), the path was expanded into a proper road running parallel to the western wall of the Grand Palace. The name Maha Rat is believed to be an abbreviation of Phra Borom Maha Ratchawang (the Grand Palace).

Although it is a short, Maha Rat Road passes several important landmarks. In addition to the Grand Palace and Wat Pho, these include Tha Maha Rat, Tha Chang, Royal Thai Navy Club, Tha Ratcha Woradit, Tha Tien, Museum Siam, Chakrabongse Villas and Rajini School.

In 2022, an underground pedestrian tunnel was completed at Tha Chang, linking Maha Rat Road with Na Phra Lan Road. The tunnel is 4.7 m (15.4 ft) deep and extends for about 90 m (295.3 ft). It is fully air-conditioned for the convenience of visitors and houses a permanent exhibition featuring photographs and information about the Rattanakosin Island area. In addition, there are 35 free public toilets available, comprising 15 for men and 20 for women.
