= Chao Mae Thapthim Shrine, Phahurat =

Chinese joss house in Bangkok, Thailand

Coordinates: 13°44′35.68″N 100°30′4.68″E

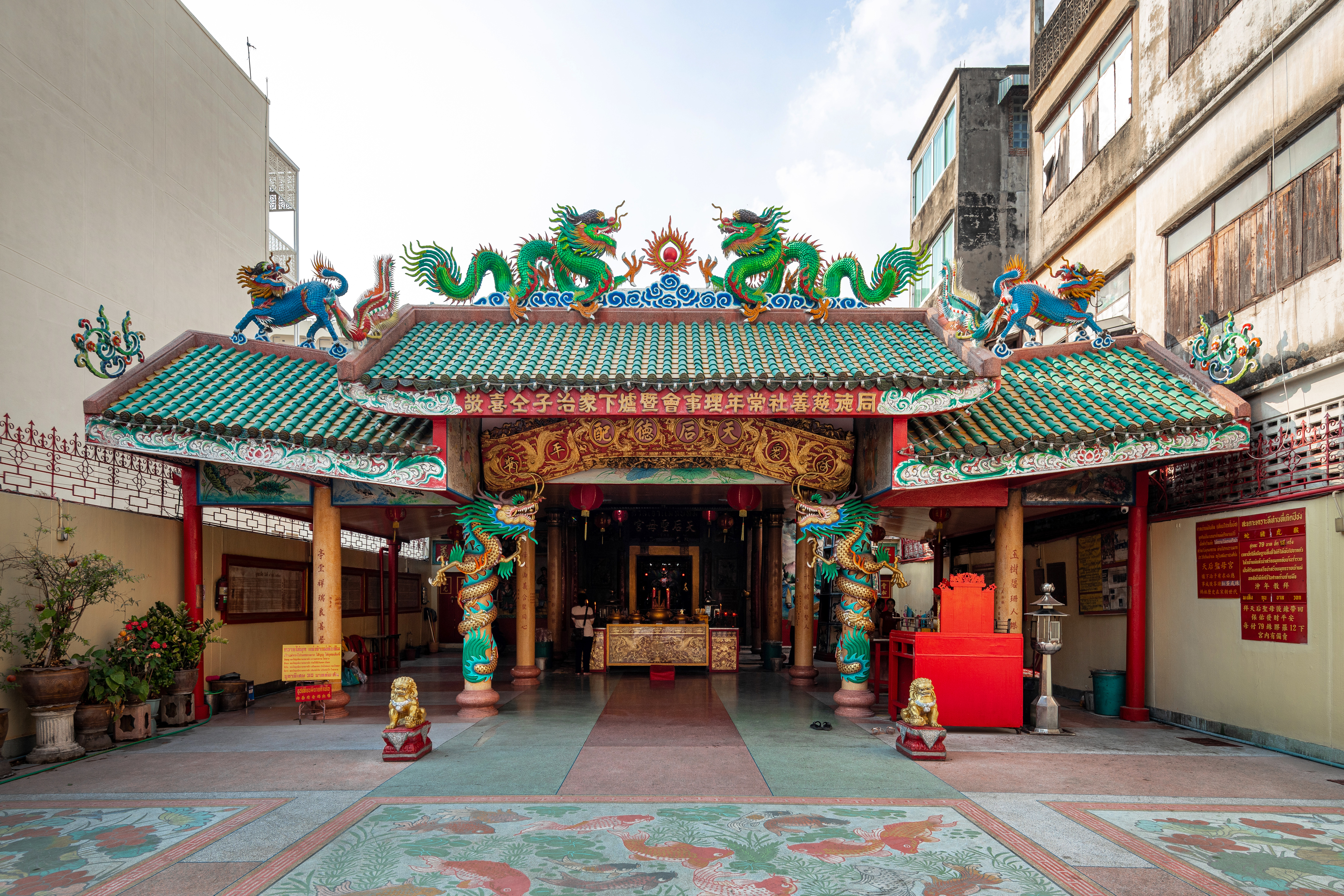
Courtyard of the shrine in February 2025

Chao Mae Thapthim Shrine (Thai: ศาลเจ้าแม่ทับทิม; Chinese: 水尾聖娘廟; pinyin: shuǐwěi shèng niáng miào) is a historic Chinese joss house located at 257 Chakkraphet Road, Wang Burapha Phirom Subdistrict, Phra Nakhon District, Bangkok near foot of Phra Pok Klao Bridge and Phahurat area, also known as Little India.

It's the shrine of Chao Mae Thaptim (เจ้าแม่ทับทิม; literally: Ruby Godmother) or Mazu, goddess of the sea and maritime according to the belief of the Hainan people since ancient times similar to Shui Wei Sheng Niang, another goddess of the sea according to Chinese beliefs as well. Usually, Thai people call these two goddesses "Chao Mae Thaptim" and understand that the same goddess. Because they both wear red robes as well. But really, they're different goddess.

This shrine was registered as a house of worship since 1917 under supervision of Ministry of Interior. The interior enshrined wooden image of the goddess. It's said that the sandalwood floating to the mouth of Pak Khlong Talat nearby. The building of shrine was damaged by bombing of Second World War and was rebuilt in 1955, as seen today. It has been registered as one of Bangkok's archaeological sites since 1988.
