= Wat Ratchaburana Ratchaworawihan =

Buddhist temple in Bangkok, Thailand

- วัดราชบุรณราชวรวิหาร
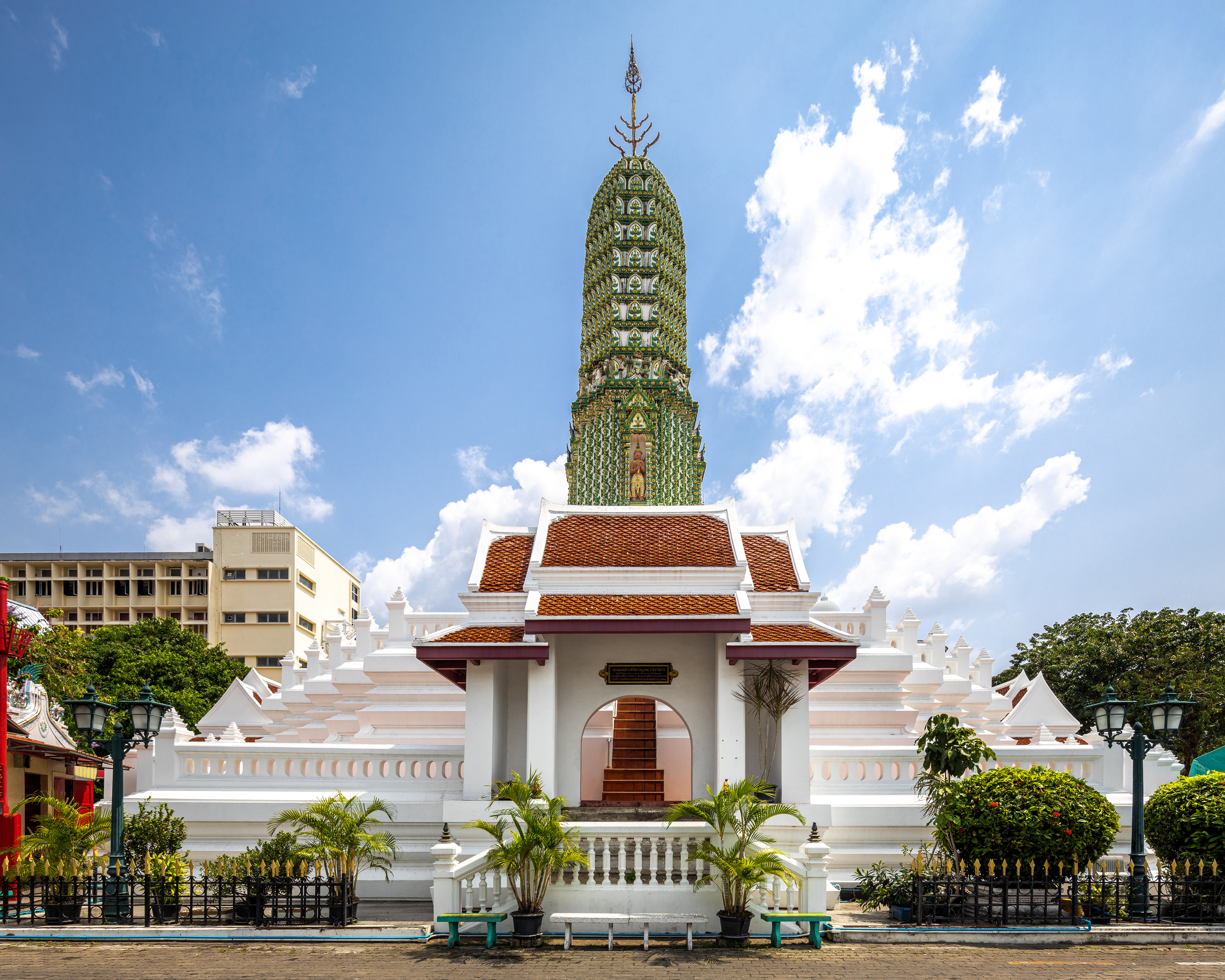

- Location within Bangkok

Religion
- Affiliation: Buddhism

Location
- Location: 119 Chakkraphet Road, Wang Burapha Phirom Subdistrict, Phra Nakhon District, Bangkok
- Country: Thailand
- Interactive map of Wat Ratchaburana Ratchaworawihan
- Coordinates: 13°44′32.28″N 100°29′56.76″E

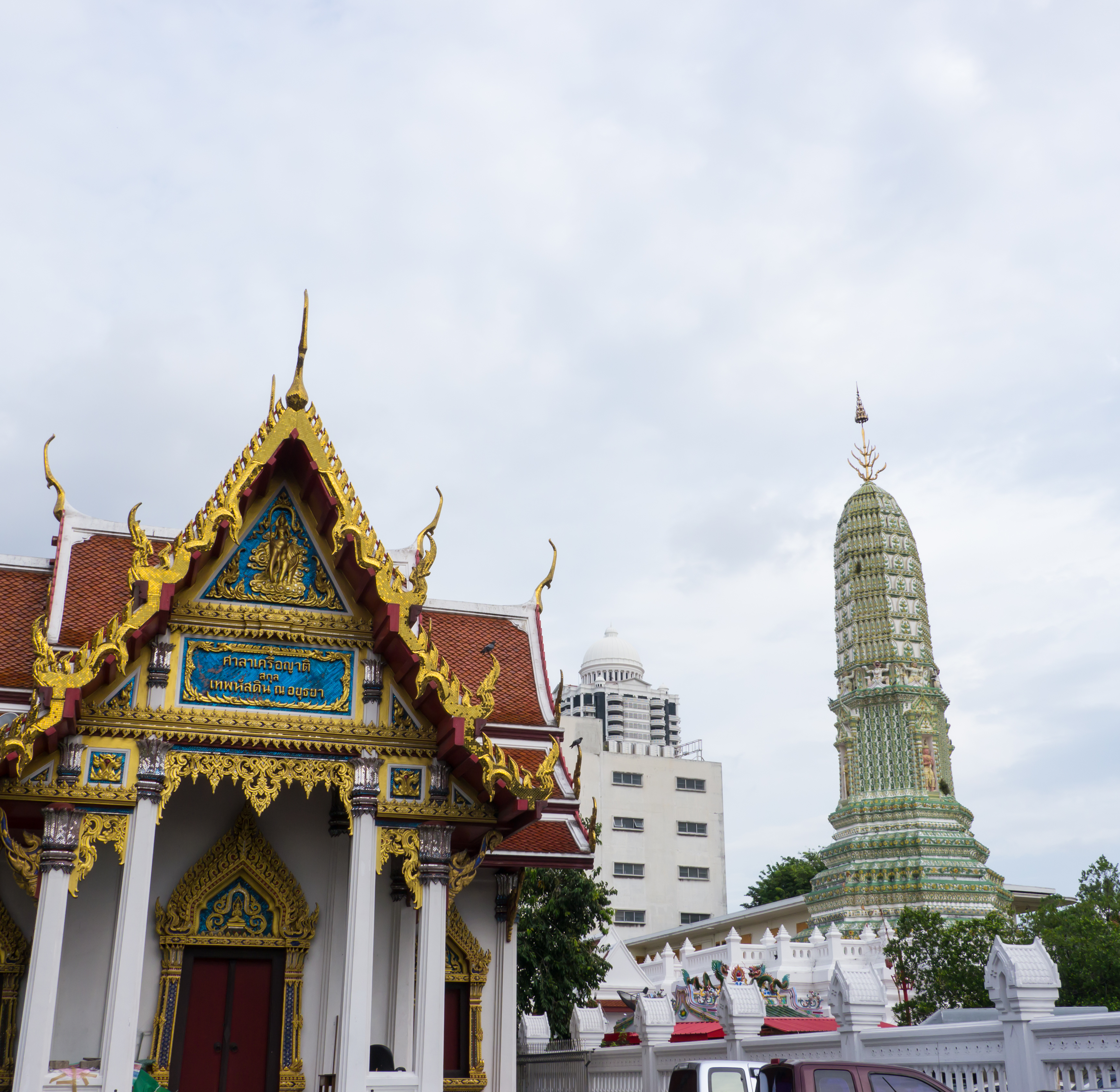
Ubosot of Wat Ratchaburana Ratchaworawihan and the prang

Wat Ratchaburana Ratchaworawihan (Thai: วัดราชบุรณราชวรวิหาร) or usually shortened to Wat Ratchaburana (วัดราชบูรณะ), commonly known as Wat Liap (วัดเลียบ), is a second-class temple in Maha Nikaya sect of Buddhism, located at 119 Chakkraphet Road, Wang Burapha Phirom Subdistrict, Phra Nakhon District, Bangkok at the foot of the Memorial Bridge near Pak Khlong Talat and Praisaniyakarn, diagonally from the Long Corridor of Suankularb Wittayalai School.

The temple was built in the late Ayutthaya period by a wealthy Chinese merchant named "Liap" (เลี้ยบ). In the Thonburi period, the temple was the residence of ecclesiastical dignitaries. In 1793, during the reign of King Rama I, Prince Krom Luang Thepharirak, the king's nephew, had the temple restored with the king's support. The temple was made the royal temple and named "Ratchaburana" (literally: "restored by the king"), which was also the name of the temple in the Sukhothai period.

In King Rama II's reign, 162 Buddha images were brought to the temple and the vihara (sanctuary) was built for enshrining 80 Buddha images inside. In 1945, during World War II, the temple was seriously damaged and deleted from the official list. Later, Phra Khuna Charawat (พระคุณาจารวัตร) the then abbot and local people helped to rebuild the temple. The present ubosot (ordination hall) was built in 1960. The most outstanding building of this temple is the prang (Khmer-style pagoda), which was built in the reign of King Rama III and restored in 1962 and again in 2007 by the Metropolitan Electricity Authority (MEA).

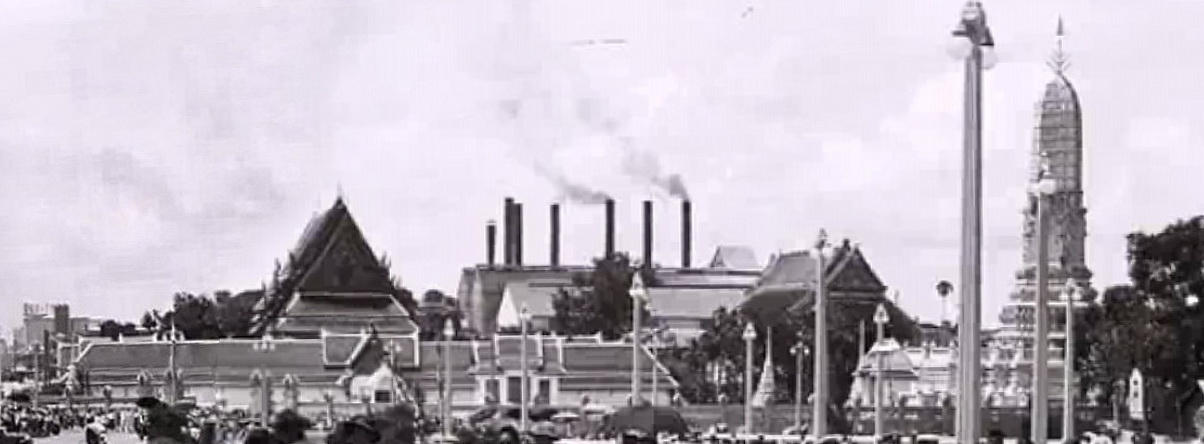
Wat Ratchaburana before World War II

Apart from the beautiful tradition architectures and Buddha images, the highlight is the wall paintings inside the ubosot, which is the work of Khrua In Khong (ขรัวอินโข่ง), a monk and a talented artist who lived during the reign of King Rama IV.
