= Charoenrat 31 Bridge =

Bridge in Bangkok, Thailand

Charoenrat 31 Bridge สะพานเจริญรัช ๓๑
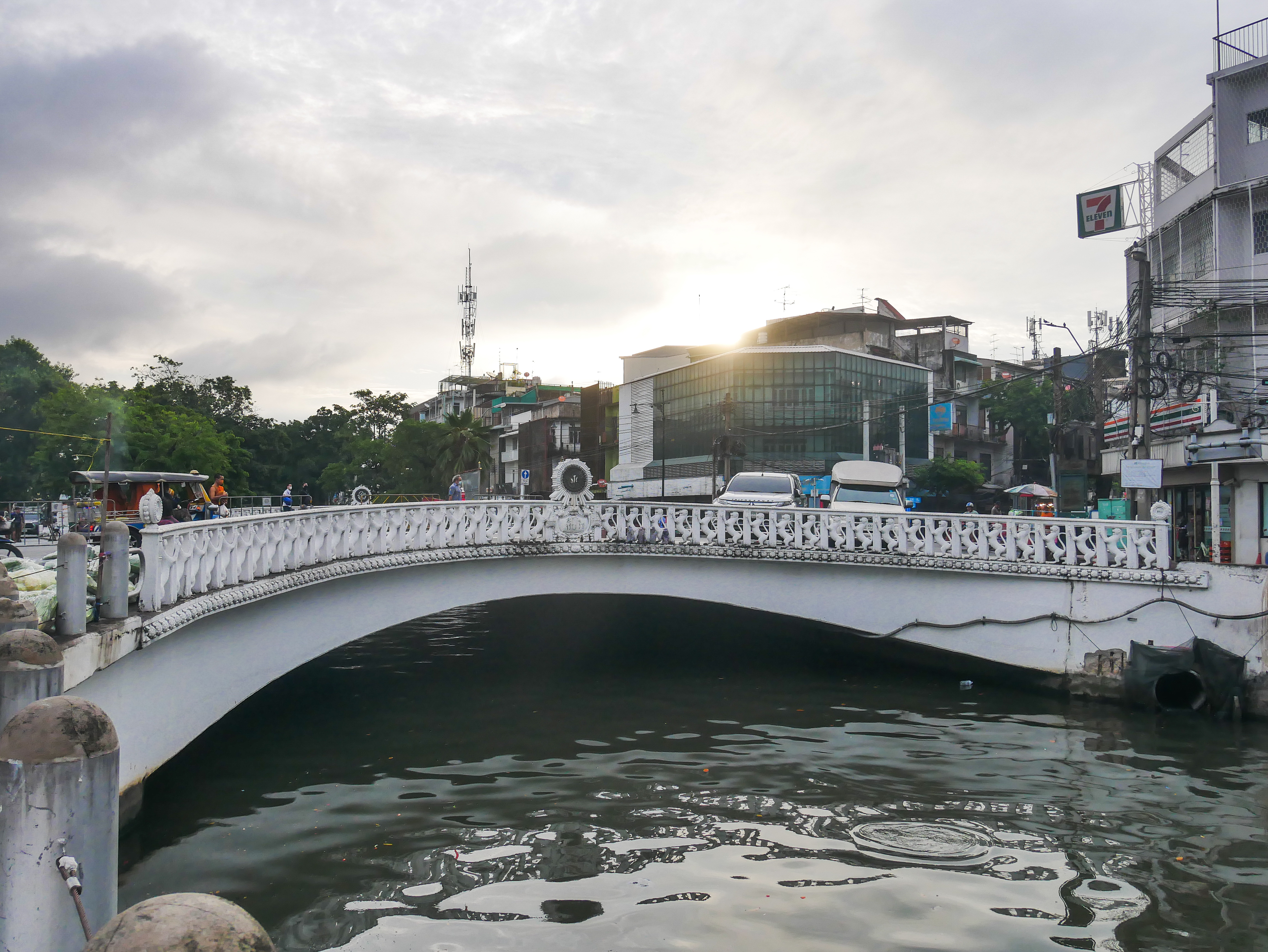
- Coordinates: 13°34′08″N 100°29′42″E
- Carries: Maha Rat Road
- Crosses: Khlong Khu Mueang Doem
- Locale: Phra Borom Maha Ratchawang & Wang Burapha Phirom Sub-districts, Phra Nakhon District, Bangkok
- Official name: Charoenrat 31 Bridge
- Maintained by: Bangkok Metropolitan Administration (BMA)

History
- Opened: December 30, 1911

Charoenrat 31 Bridge (Thai: สะพานเจริญรัช ๓๑) is a historic structure that spans the southern city moat near the Pak Khlong Talat. It was originally paired with Chaloem Sawan 58 Bridge, which stood across the northern section of the moat but was demolished in 1971 during the construction of Phra Pinklao Bridge.

King Vajiravudh (Rama VI) contributed an amount equal to his age toward the construction of the bridge, as a public offering on the occasion of his birthday in 1910, the first year of his reign. The bridge officially opened in 1911 and was named "Charoenrat 31" mean "the King prospered 31 years". It was also the first bridge bearing the name "Charoen", followed later by Charoenrat 32 Bridge in the Bobae area.

This reinforced concrete bridge features semicircular balustrades adorned with reliefs of tigers, symbolizing the Wild Tiger Corps founded by the King in the same year. The bridge's name is inscribed within a European-style floral frame, while the King's royal monogram is engraved at the top of the bridge wall. The number "31", representing the King's age at the time, is displayed at both ends of the balustrade. The bridge has been officially registered as a national heritage site by the Fine Arts Department since 1975.

== Neighbouring places ==
- Pak Khlong Talat
- Rajini School & Rajinee Pier (N7)
- Sanam Chai MRT station (BL31)
- Phra Ratchawang Police Station
