= Ban Mo, Bangkok =

Street in Bangkok, Thailand

Coordinates: 13°44′43″N 100°29′51″E

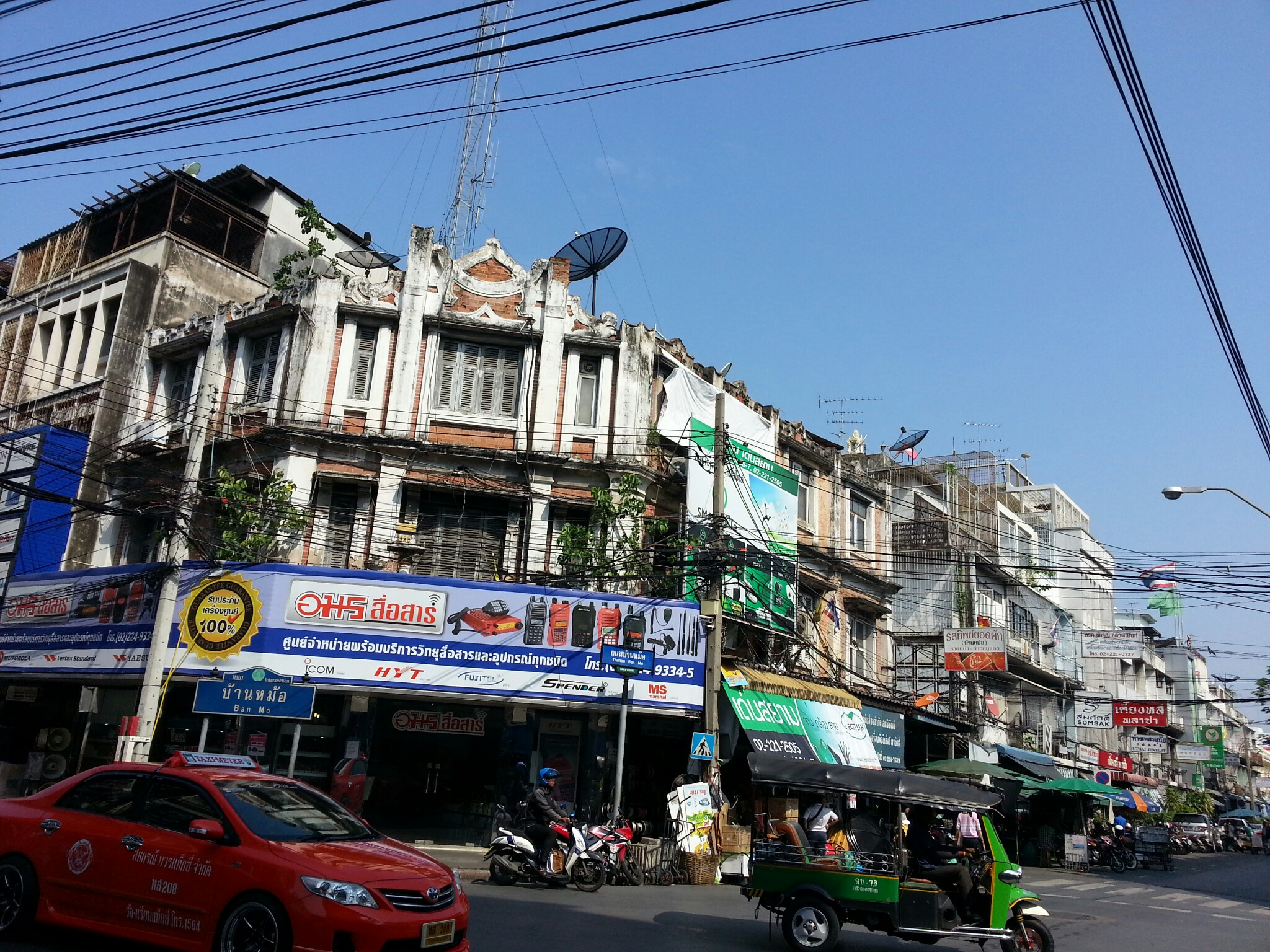
Ban Mo Intersection, where it meets Phahurat Road

Ban Mo (Thai: บ้านหม้อ, pronounced [bâːn.mɔ̂ː]) is the name of a street and its corresponding neighbourhood in Bangkok's Wang Burapha Phirom Subdistrict, Phra Nakhon District. It is located just outside the old inner moat in the historic Rattanakosin Island area. The road runs a short distance of 0.6 kilometres (0.37 mi) from Si Kak Phraya Si Intersection, where it meets Charoen Krung and Fueang Nakhon roads, to meet Chak Phet Road in the Pak Khlong Talat area. It passes the beginning of Phahurat Road at Ban Mo Intersection. It can be considered a road with one-way traffic management.

The area was settled during the Thonburi period by Mon and Vietnamese settlers, whose primary trade was pottery. The area thus became known as Ban Mo, meaning "pottery village". The trade later shifted to goldworking, as well as diamond jewellery. Today, the neighbourhood has become a well known centre of shops specialising in electronics and audio equipment.

At present, the remaining evidence of pottery consists of a pair of pot sculptures decorating the gables of the twin entrance gates to Ban Mo Market.

Moreover, Ban Mo was also site the first headquarters of Siam Commercial Bank (SCB) in 1904 as Book Club (now, the building is adjacent to Saowabha Vocational College) before moving to Talat Noi in Yaowarat neighbourhood soon after. Today's Siam Commercial Bank, Talat Noi Branch. And also home to the San Chao Por Ban Mo Lao Pun Tao Kong (Chinese: 萬茂老本頭公古廟; pinyin: wàn mào lǎo běn tóu gōng gǔ miào), Teochew's joss house is believed to be the oldest in Bangkok established since 1816.

== Gallery ==
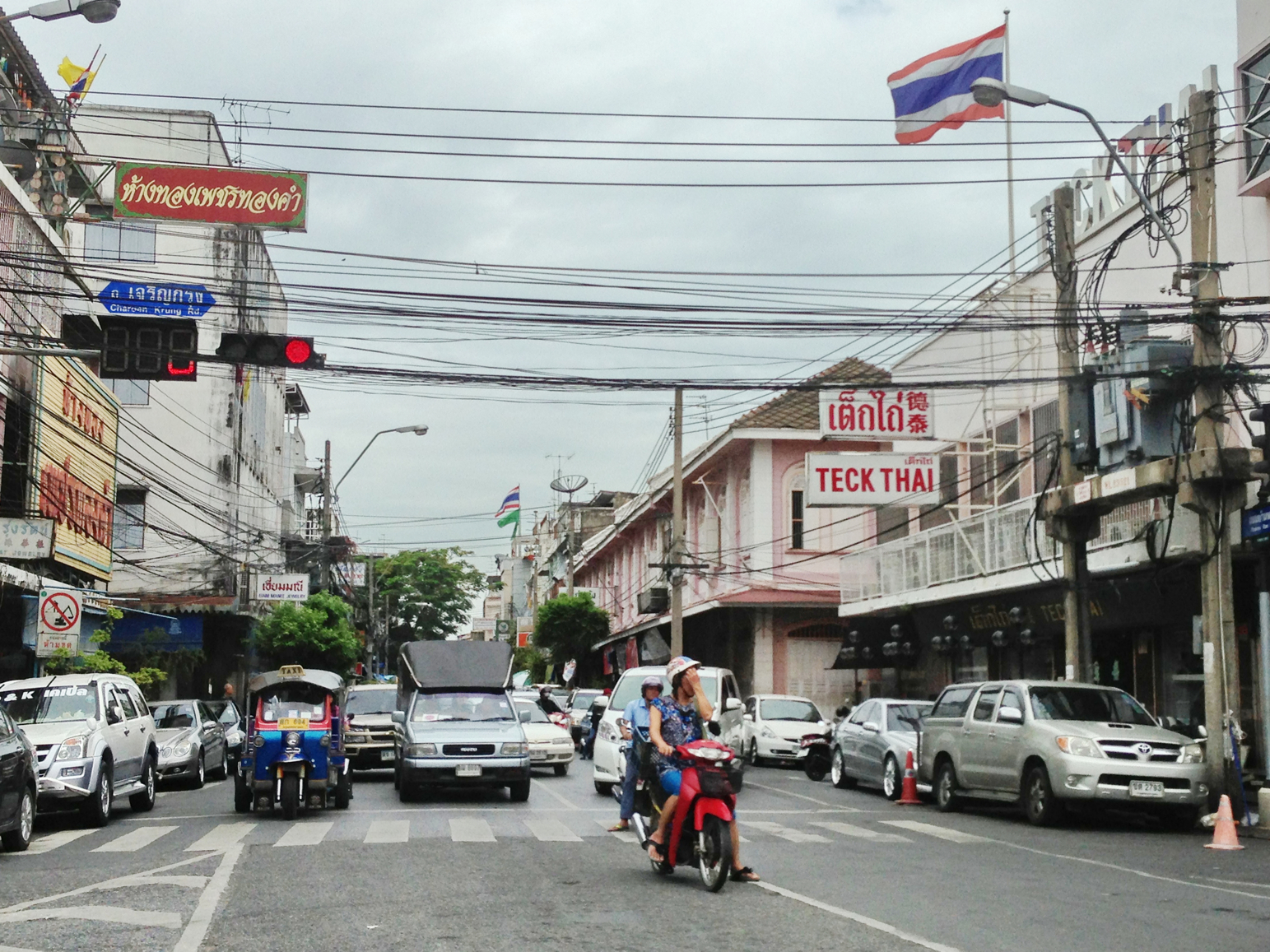
Ban Mo Road at Si Kak Phraya Si Intersection

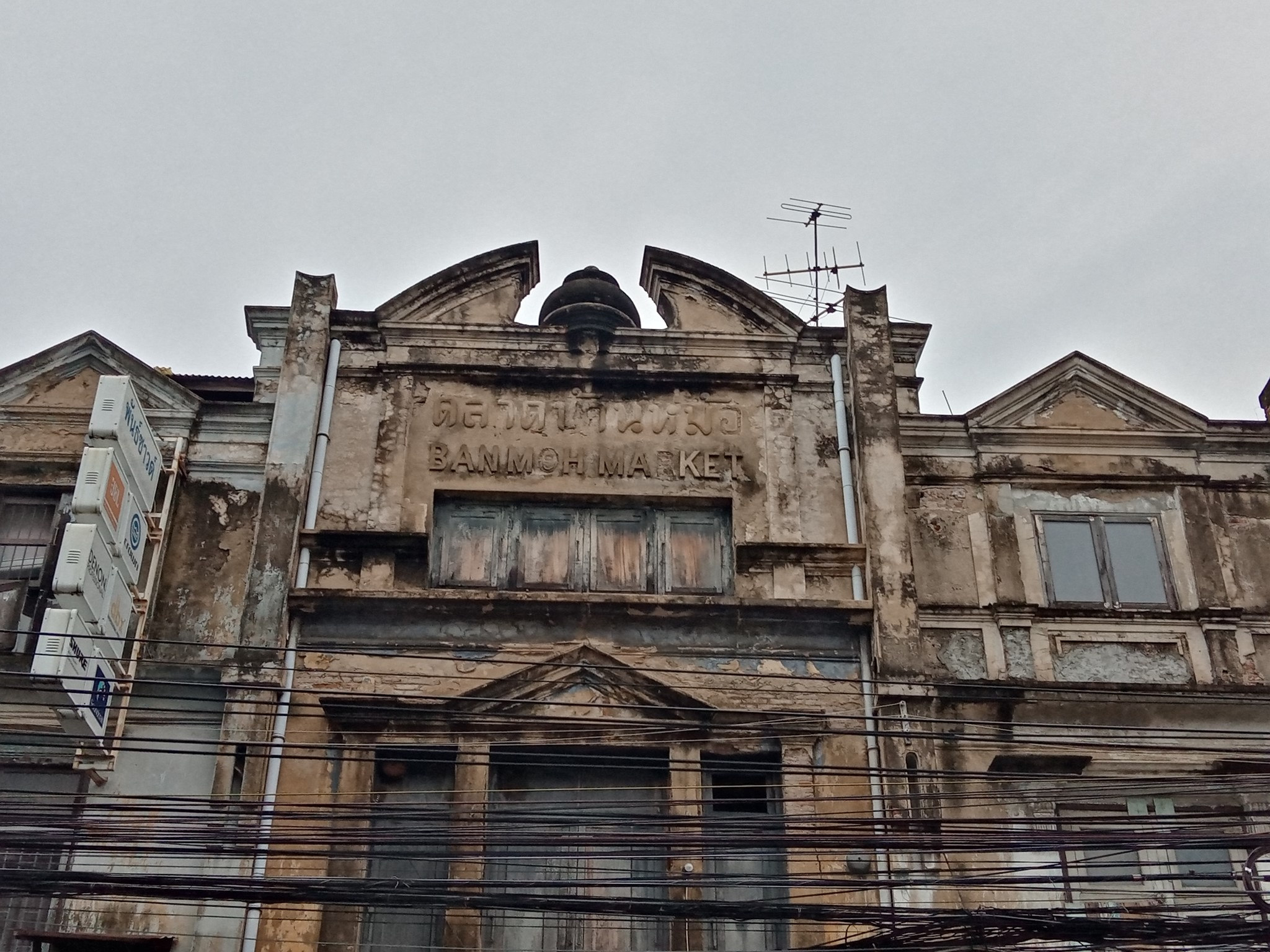
One of the pot sculptures at Ban Mo Market

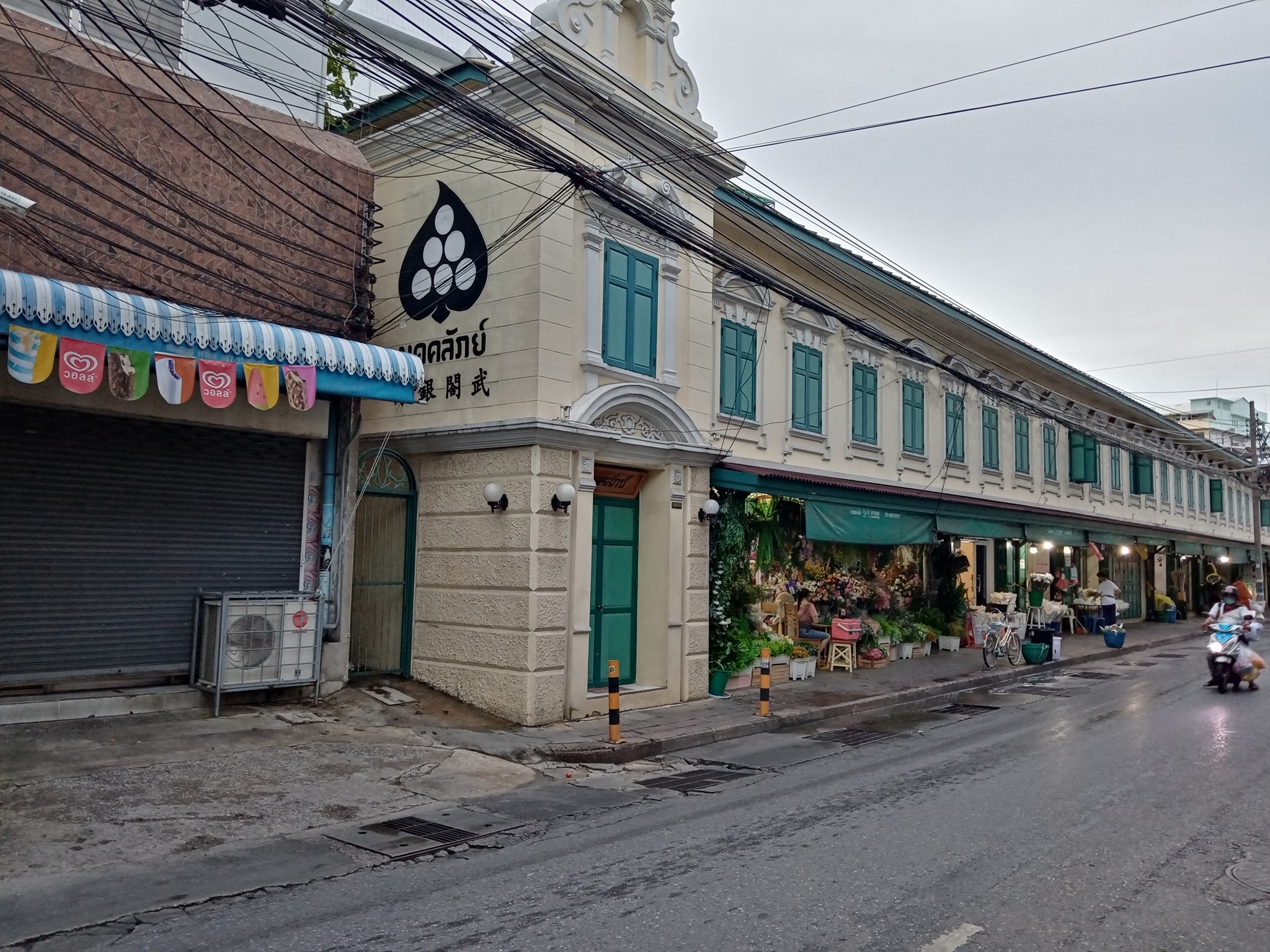
"Book Club" the first headquarters of Siam Commercial Bank (SCB)

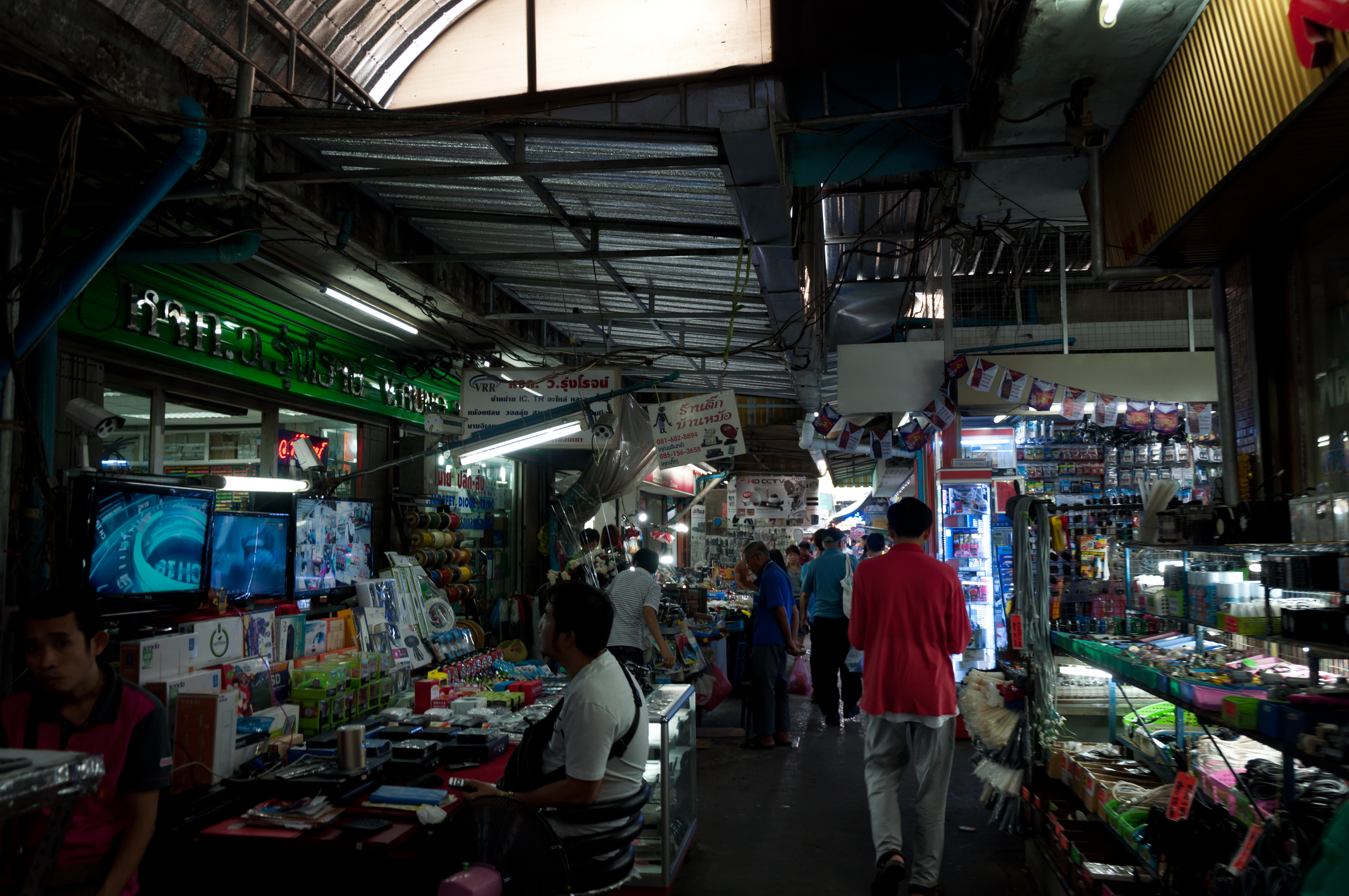
The vibrant atmosphere of audio and electronics trading
