= Army Reserve Command =

Army Reserve Command may refer to:

- United States Army Reserve Command (United States of America)
- Philippine Army Reserve Command (Philippines)
- Army Reserve Command (Thailand), now known as the Territorial Defense Command
