= Territorial Defense Student =

- นักศึกษาวิชาทหาร
- Emblem of Thai Reserved Offices Training Cadet
- Active: 1948 - Present
- Country: Thailand
- Branch: Royal Thai Army; Royal Thai Navy; Royal Thai Air Force
- Type: Military reserve force
- Part of: Territorial Defense Command
- Garrison/HQ: Reserve Affairs Center, Bangkok (13°44'46"N 100°29'42"E)
- Nickname: Rordor (ร.ด.)
- Mottos: "แม้หวังตั้งสงบ จงเตรียมรบให้พร้อมสรรพ์ ศัตรูกล้ามาประจัน จะอาจสู้ริปูสลาย" ("Hope for peace, so be prepared for a fight. No foe is more fearless than us.")
- Colors: Khaki-Green
- March: Territorial Defence Students' march (มาร์ชนักศึกษาวิชาทหาร)
- Anniversaries: 8 December
- Engagements: Battle of Tha Nang Sang bridge

Commanders
- Current commander: Lieutenant General Watcharin Muthasin
- Notable commanders: General Luang Suddhisanranakorn (Suddhi Sukawathi); General Khun Sinsornchai; General Vichit Sriprasert; General Yodsanan Raicharoen; General Weerachai Inthusophon

Insignia
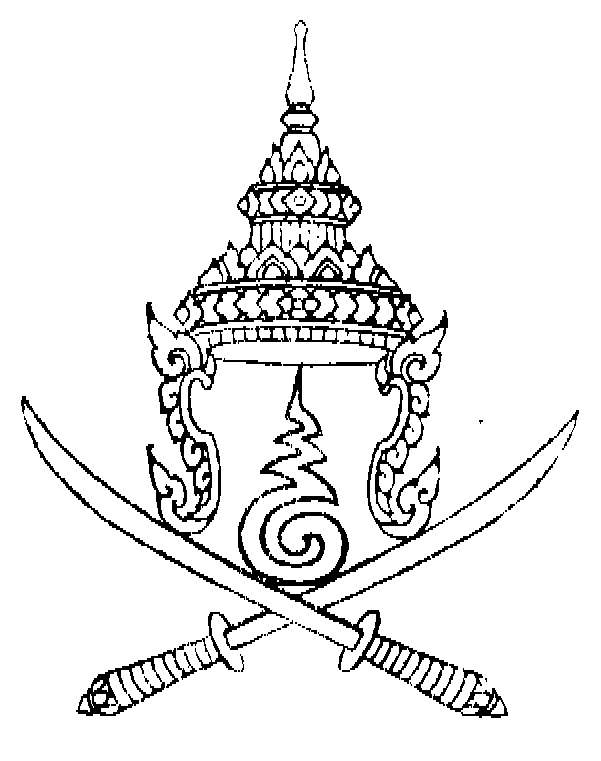
- Regimental Insignia: Crossed swords under the Great Crown of Victory

The Territorial Defense Student (Thai: นักศึกษาวิชาทหาร; RTGS: nak sueksa wicha thahan) is a military youth organization in Thailand under control of the Royal Thai Army, and recently the Royal Thai Navy and Royal Thai Air Force.

== History ==
Colours of Provincial "Yuwachon Thahan" unit, a Thai military youth organization in 1934-1947.

Prior to World War II the Yuwachon Thahan (Thai: ยุวชนทหาร, lit. 'junior soldiers') or more commonly referred to as Territorial Defense (รักษาดินแดน, shortened as ร.ด. in Thai) were established in 1934 by Field Marshal Plaek Phibunsongkhram. At the beginning of World War II junior soldiers were sent to fight troops of the Japanese Empire that invaded southern Thailand on 8 December 1941.

At the end of the war the junior soldiers were disbanded, but Lieutenant General Luang Chatnakrop (พล.ท. หลวงชาตินักรบ) created the territorial defense cadets to replace them in 1948.

=== Battle of Tha Nang Sang Bridge ===
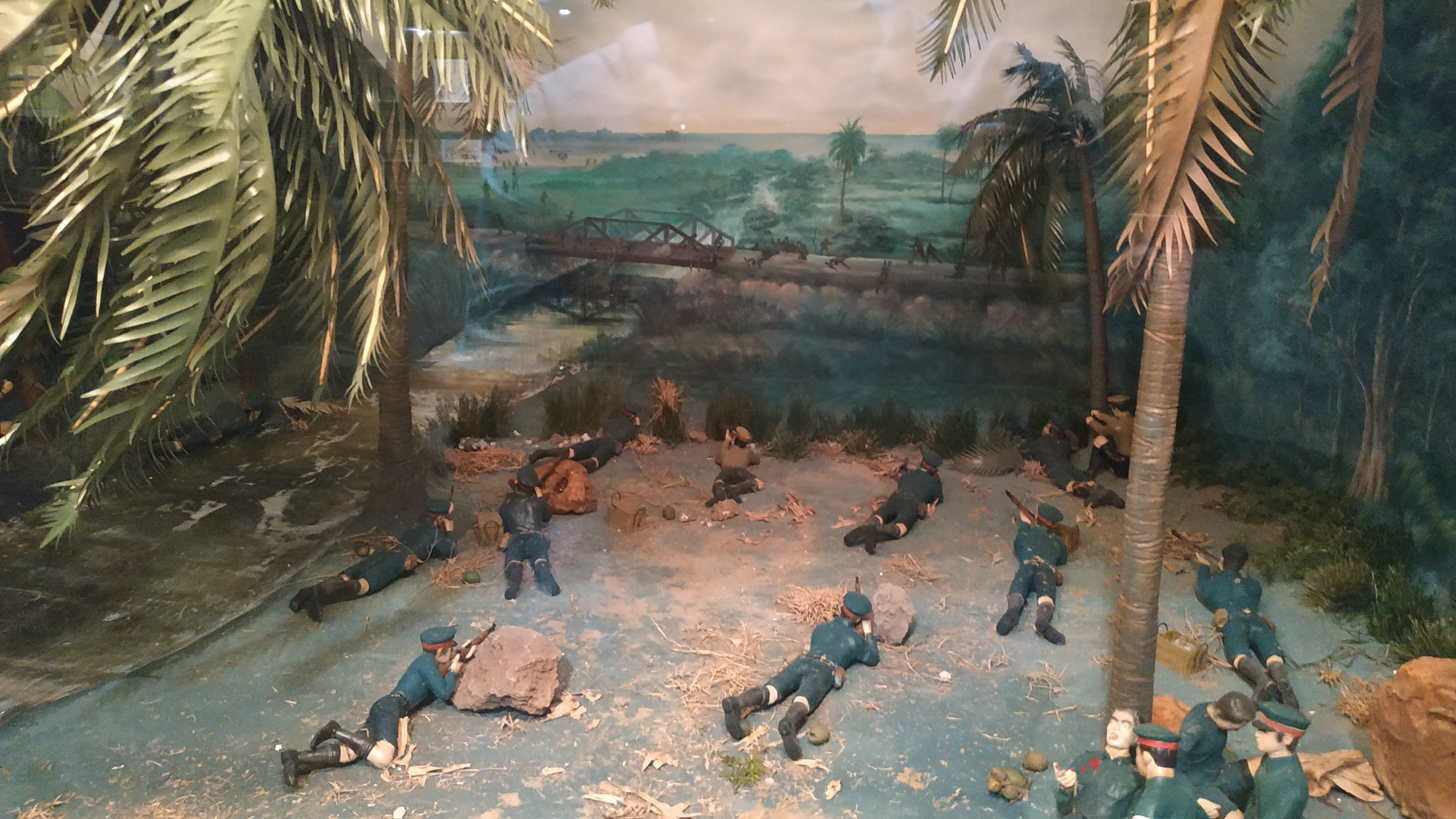
Battle of Tha Nang Sang Bridge in 8 December 1941 between the Imperial Japanese Army and Thai forces, consist of officers from the Royal Thai Army, Thai policemen and Thai junior soldiers, at Chumphon Province (diorama at National Memorial)

On the first day of the Japanese invasion of Southeast Asia (8 December 1941), the Imperial Japanese Army sent troops to many parts of Chumphon province. At Ma Hat Bay, the Japanese forces landed on beaches stretching from Ban Pak Nam Chumphon to Ban Kho Son. The 38th Infantry Battalion of the Royal Thai Army, about 17 km away, was too far away to intercept the initial invaders in time. As a result, roughly 100 of the reserve cadets and the local police force had to hold the numerically superior Japanese army at bay from positions on the west side of Tha Nang Sang Bridge until the 38th Infantry could arrive.

The force of reserve cadets and policemen sent their 1st Light Machine Gun Company across the bridge at 08:00. They then went through Wat Tha Yang Tai to block any Japanese reinforcements. The commander of 38th Infantry wished to send his 4th Heavy Machine Gun Company across the bridge to protect the government buildings on the Tha Taphoa River, but the Japanese troops fired upon the Thai defenders from the other side of the river. The reserve cadets, under command of Captain Thawin Niyomsen, commander of the Chumphon Junior Soldiers Training Centre, charged cross the bridge to seize strategic points on the east side. Under heavy Japanese fire, Captain Thawin was killed when he attempted to find a new position for his light machine gun squad. The remaining cadets, now headed by Sergeant Samran Khuanphan from the training centre, were able to maintain their position, and waited for friendly reinforcements. Thailand, however, surrendered to Japan before noon.

== Requirements ==
1. Thai nationality
2. Age younger than 22 years
3. Approval of parents or guardians
4. A grade-point average above 1.00 or a certificate of passing senior scout
5. A certificate of health. People with disabilities, fatal sickness, disease, or eye problems such as color blindness are not allowed.
6. Body mass index of less than 35 for male, and less than 30 for female (obesity)
7. Must have appropriate body height and size corresponding to age
8. Passing a fitness test of an 800-meter run in 3 minutes 15 seconds, 34 sit-ups in two minutes, and 22 push-ups in two minutes. Female applicants have more relaxed requirements.
9. Cadets are required to cut their hair so that the white of their scalp is visible on 3-sides, and a small patch of hair is visible on the top of the head.

Applicants who do not meet fitness test requirements are ranked by their scores. Applicants with higher scores have priority. Applicants who do not meet other criteria may be accepted in a case-by-case basis. Number of applicants is proportional to the funding.

== Study ==
=== Royal Thai Army ===
Territorial Defense cadets have to study 80 hours per year and attend a period of field training, but commonly only for Grade 2 through Grade 5 cadets. The cadets must have a perfect presence for training course and are not allowed to skip any exams, but are allowed to skip 16 hours of study. At the end of every semester territorial defense cadets have to pass an exam to continue their study at the next grade.

Territorial Defense cadets have to pass:

- Marksmanship test using a rifle, where the test parameters are related to grade
- Paper test of multiple-choice questions (Only for year 3 to 5 cadets)
- Physical test covering procedures, use of tools, and discipline learned during the year
- Field training, for year 2 and above cadets.

=== Field training ===
Field training lengths (dependent on grade and gender of the student):

- Grade 2; male: three days
- Grade 3; male: four days
- Grade 4-5; male: seven days
- Grade 2-3; female: three days
- Grade 4-5; female: four days

Field training occurs at Khao Chon Kai Training Camp for Grade 2 and 3 cadets studying at a territorial defense training centre within the Bangkok Metropolitan Area or the central region of Thailand, and all Grade 4 and 5 cadets from throughout the country. For Grade 2 and 3 cadets studying in other areas, the field training occurs at the respective training centre's designated area.

=== Perks of graduation ===
Territorial defense cadets gain the following perks, depending on the training years they have passed.

- Cadets who complete Grade 1 are equivalent to private first class and their service period as conscript will be reduced by six months.
  - Reduced by another six months, if voluntary.
- Cadets who complete Grade 2 are equivalent to corporal and their service period as conscript will be reduced down to one year.
  - Reduced by another six months, if voluntary.
- Cadets who complete Grade 3 are equivalent to sergeant, and are exempt from conscription. This is why the majority of Thai men go through this training rather than risk conscription.
  - Those who wish may request to use the said rank title.
- Cadets who complete Grade 4 are equivalent to staff sergeant.
- Cadets who complete Grade 5 and their bachelor's degree are commissioned as acting second lieutenants.
  - As an equivalent of an off-duty commission officier, they are allowed to dress in officer uniform in any occasions (and carry sabres) as applicable.

In addition, they gain an additional total score when they take admission exams for application to military academies of the Armed Forces and the Police. Graduating the first grade gives 3 marks to add to total score, and one more mark is added for each subsequent years. (Up to 7 total marks)

=== Royal Thai Navy ===
Territorial defense training was introduced in 2009 for the Royal Thai Navy, only for cadets and youth living nearby the Sattahip Naval Base in Chonburi Province. About 90 cadets are accepted each year and training is done at the Sattahip Naval Base. Upon reaching Grade 3, cadets will then further separate into one of the three smaller units operated separately by:

- The Royal Thai Marine Corps
- Coastal Defense Command
- Strategic Naval Command

=== Royal Thai Air Force ===
Territorial defense training was introduced in 2006 and available until Grade 5 by 2010 for the Royal Thai Air Force, only for cadets studying in polytechnic colleges within the locale of the Don Muang Royal Thai Air Force Base, Bangkok. The study will involve only about the mechanical side of the air force only.

=== Small arms ===
Name	Type	Caliber	Origin	Notes
Type 86	Semi-automatic pistol	.45 ACP	Thailand	M1911A1 pistols produced under license.
Type 11	Assault rifle	5.56mm	Thailand	Thai license produced version of the Heckler & Koch HK33. Used by territorial defense cadets.
M16A1/A2/A4	Assault rifle	5.56mm	United States	Standard infantry rifle. Aging M16A1 will be replaced by IMI Tavor TAR-21 and M16A4.
M4A1 Carbine	Assault rifle	5.56mm	United States	Used by special forces. Some were equipped with SOPMOD kit.
M1 Garand	Semi-automatic rifle	.30-06	United States	Locally known as the Type 88 self-loading rifle. Used by Royal Guards and by territorial defense cadets as a non-firing training rifle.
M1/M2 Carbine	Semi-automatic rifle	.30	United States	Locally known as the Type 87 carbine. Used by territorial defense cadets as a non-firing training rifle.
Type 66	Bolt-action rifle	6.5x50mm Arisaka	Thailand	Some document claim that it is Arisaka produced under license but another document claim that it origin from Switzerland. Locally known as the Type 66 self-loading rifle (ปลยบ.66).Used by territorial defense cadets as a non-firing training rifle
Springfield	Bolt-action rifle	.30-06 Springfield	United States	Used in small numbers and only some boot camp.
FN MINIMI	Light machine gun	5.56mm	Belgium
M60 machine gun	General purpose machine gun	7.62mm	United States	Former main GPMG being replaced by FN MAG 58
FN M2HB	Heavy machine gun	12.7mm	United States
M203	Underbarrel Grenade launcher		United States
M79	Single-shot grenade launcher		United States
M72 LAW	Shoulder-fired missile		United States
RPG-2	Rocket-propelled grenade		Soviet Union
RPG-7	Rocket-propelled grenade		Soviet Union

== Uniform and insignia ==
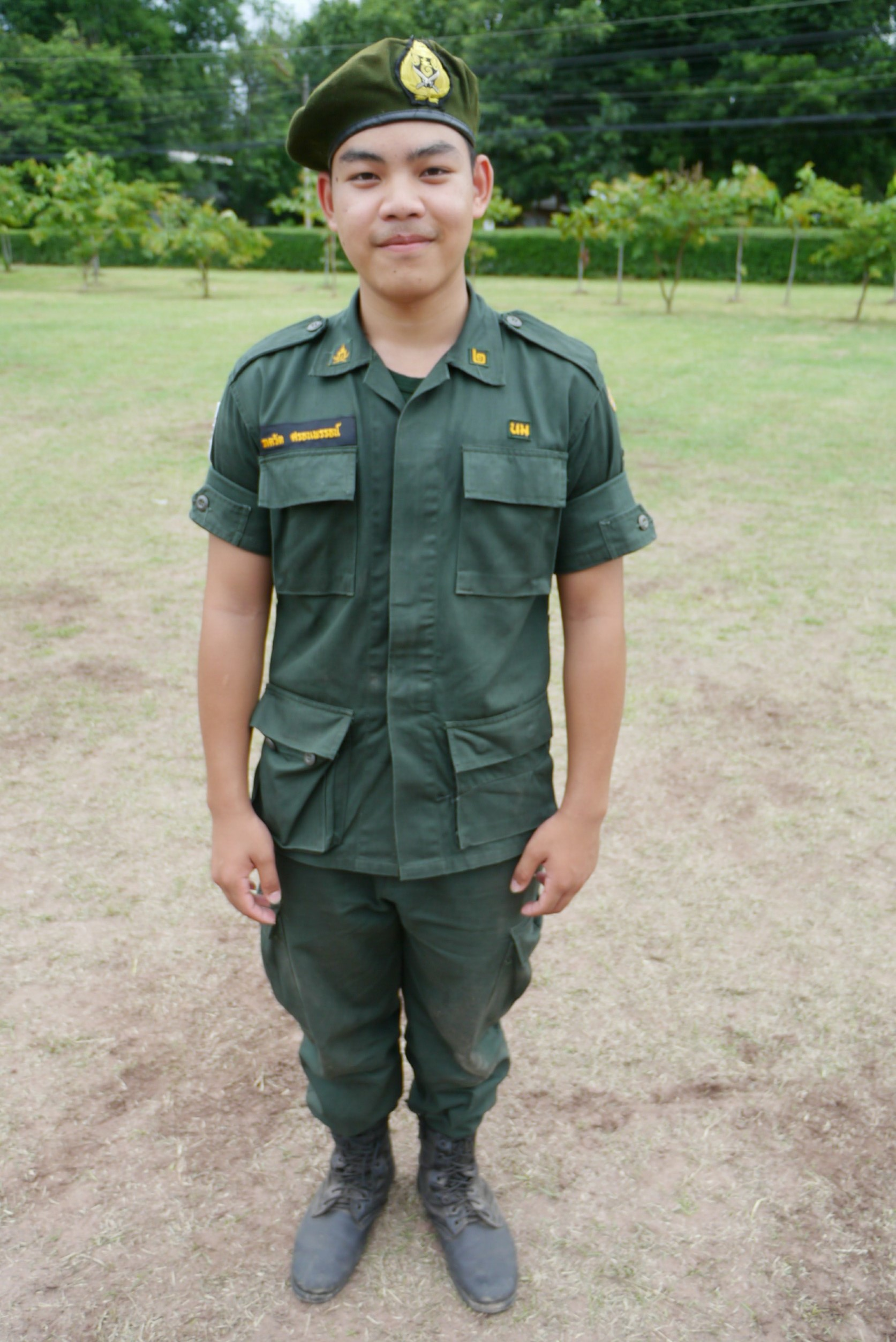
Uniform of the territorial defense student. (since 2014)

Army territorial defense cadets wear a khaki-green uniform based on the US' 2nd Pattern Battle Dress Uniform with the addition of epaulets and a pen holder on the left sleeve and beret with the Army Reserve Command Insignia (Crossed swords under The Great Crown of Victory) on their collar, beret, and belt. Territorial defense cadets distinguish their school and province by the school's coat of arms on the right shoulder, and provincial badge on left breast. The name badge is sewn on the right chest.

=== Training years and rankings ===
Each student's training year can be distinguished by rectangular Thai Numeral ranging from 1 to 5 on a khaki-background tag. For command cadets, they are distinguished with colored background and pentagonal-shaped number tag. The official colorings are as follow.

- Light Green: Squad Leader
- Red: Platoon Leader
- Light Blue: Company Commander
- Dark Blue: Battalion Commander

In practice, the command student's ranking can go up to battalion or even regiment. These off-document ranks employ off-document insignia such as armbands with text notation. Such notations can also be employed for lower positions, as command cadets do not inherit their status into the Field Training.

== Special training ==
About 120 fourth grade territorial defense cadets who pass the physical test are allowed to enter the parasail training course. Requirements are, for males, 15 pull-ups with no time limit, 47 push-ups in two minutes, 65 sit-ups in two minutes, and a one-mile run in eight minutes. Female applicants have more relaxed requirements.

== See also ==
- ROTC
- University Officer Training Corps
- Cadet
