= Khao Chon Kai Training Camp =

Khao Chon Kai Terrotorial Defence Student-Training Camp
- ค่ายฝึกเขาชนไก่
- Part of Territorial Defense Command
- Kanchanaburi, Thailand
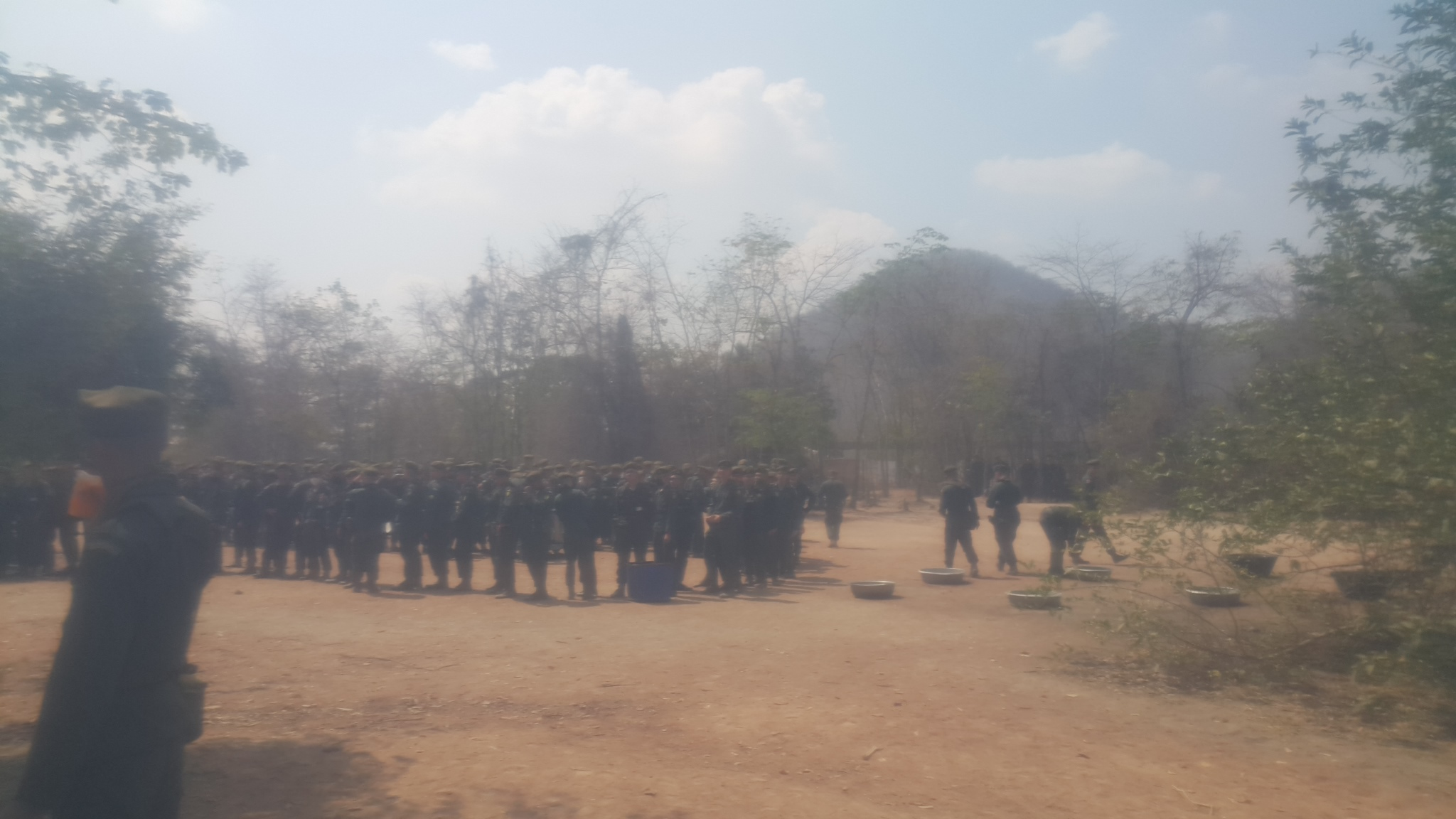
- A training ground including diluted tear gas, Khao Chon Khai mount can be observed in the background

Site information
- Type: Military Camp
- Controlled by: Territorial Defense Command, Royal Thai Army

Location
- Coordinates: 14.136368°N 99.387935°E

The Khao Chon Kai Territorial Defence Student-Training Camp (Thai: ค่ายฝึกนักศึกษาวิชาทหารเขาชนไก่) is a Royal Thai Army facility located in Tambon Lad Yha, Kanchanaburi province; on the route 3199 (Kanchanaburi - Srinagarind Dam). The main purpose of the camp is for training territorial defence students. On non-training days, activities are provided for all citizens including tower jumping, shooting and sightseeing.

== Background ==
Khao Chon Kai (lit. 'Cockfighting Hill') is believed to be where Khun Krai lived. Khun Krai was the father of Khun Phaen, a main character from the traditional Thai story of Khun Chang Khun Phaen. According to the legend, the land originally belonged to Nang Thongprasri, wife of Khun Krai. The word Chon Kai means cockfighting, as a plain ground which was believed to be the cockfighting ground of Khun Krai was discovered on the top.

== Location ==
The location of Khao Chon Kai camp is Tambon Lad Ya, Mueang Kanchanaburi District, Kanchanaburi Province, a province in western Thailand.

== Military training ==
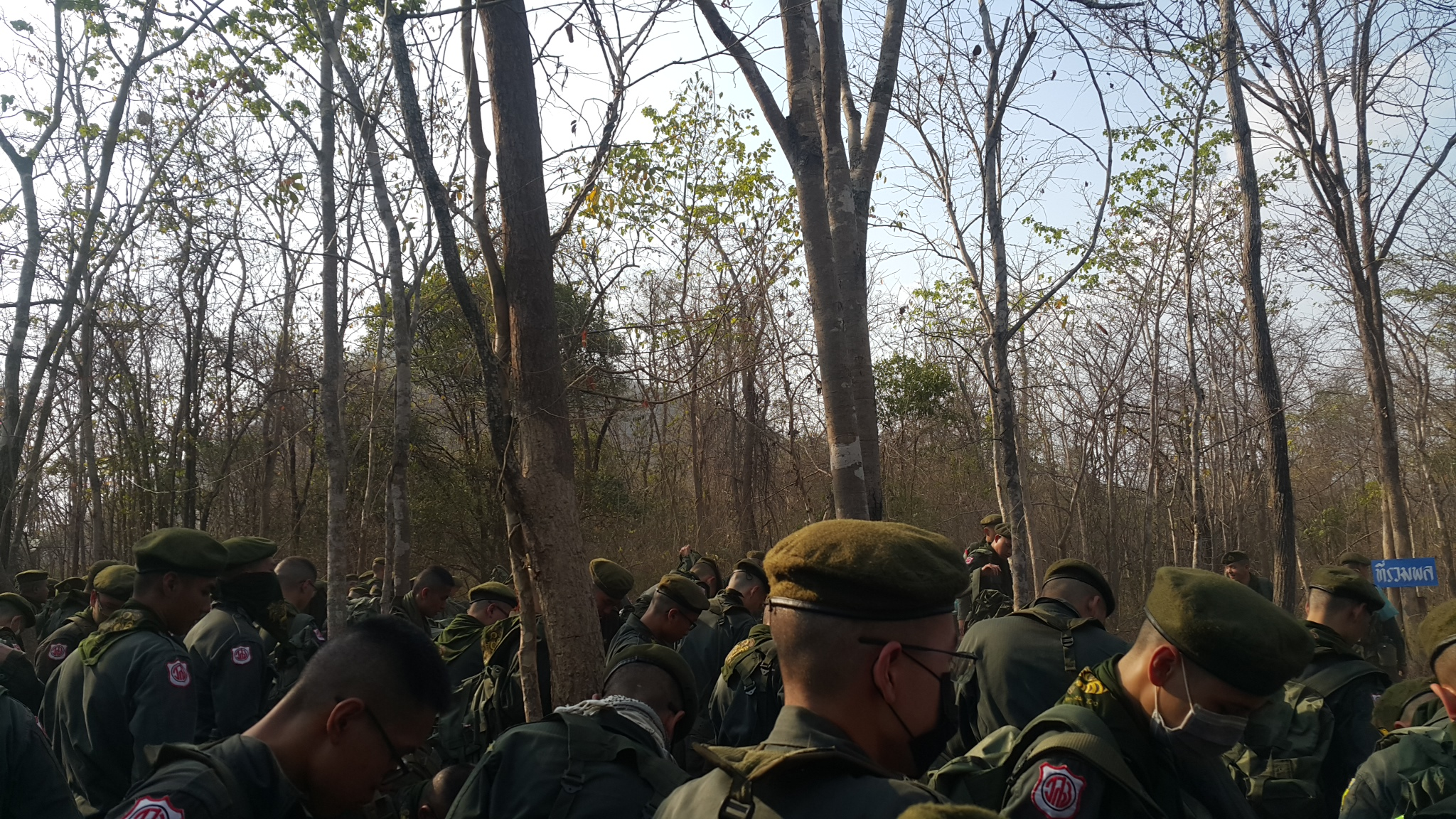
A training session

During January through early March annually, the camp is used for training of territorial defence students and then serves tourists for the rest of the year. It was not open for public tourists to camp until 11 March 2000.
