= Chak Phet Road =

Street in Wang Burapha Phirom, Thailand

Coordinates: 13°44′38.14″N 100°30′08.38″E

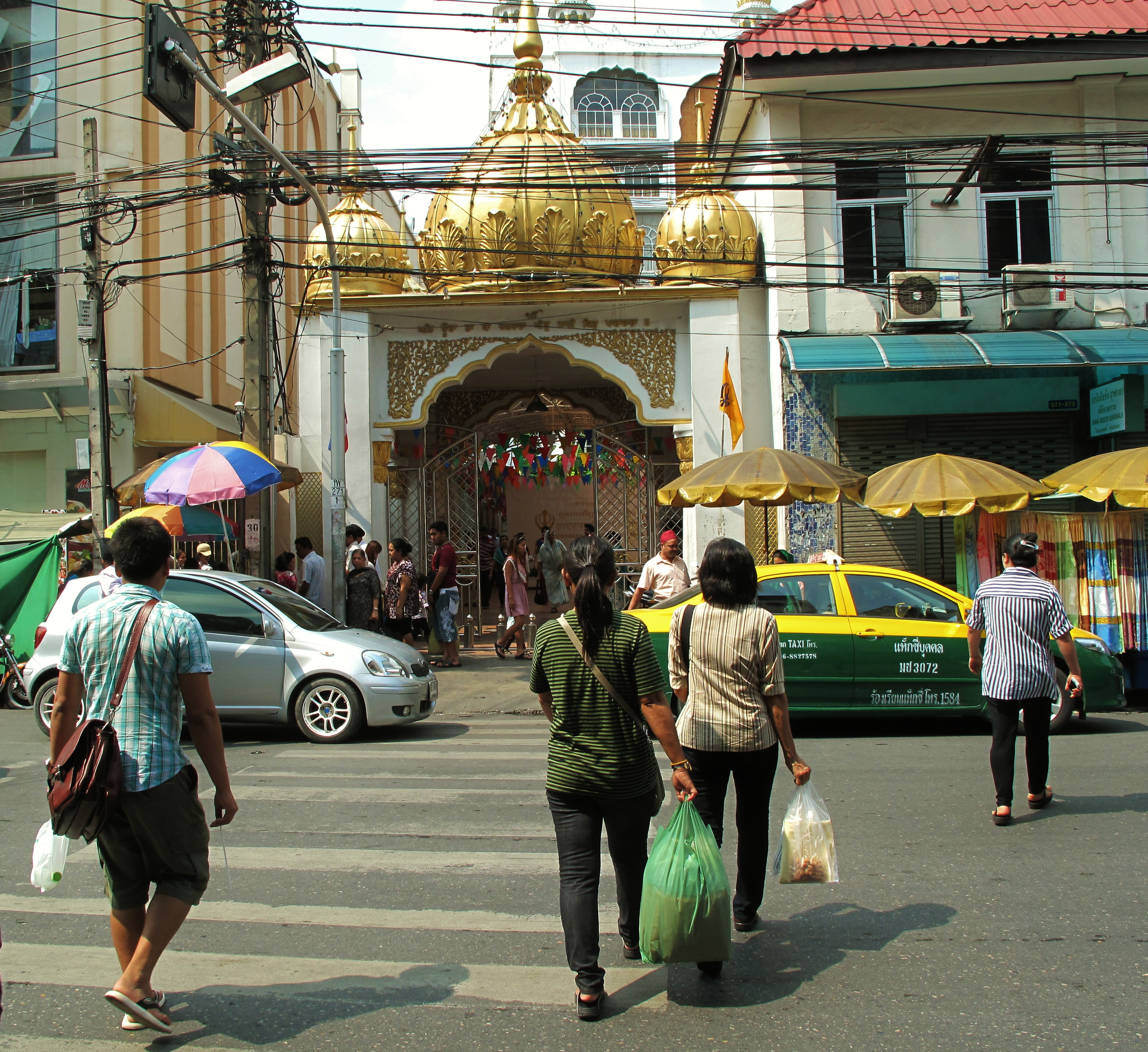
Chak Phet Road passing in front of Gurdwara Sri Guru Singh Sabha

Chak Phet Road (Thai: ถนนจักรเพชร, pronounced [tʰā.nǒn t͡ɕàk pʰét]; sometimes spelled Chakkraphet or Chakphet) is located in Wang Burapha Phirom Subdistrict, Phra Nakhon District, Bangkok, with a total length of 1,120 m (3,674 ft).

The road is named after Pom Chak Phet, a fort that once stood at the southernmost tip of Rattanakosin Island, near the mouth of the Khlong Rop Krung canal, close to the present-day foot of the Memorial Bridge. The fort was one of fourteen defensive structures built during the reign of King Phutthayotfa Chulalok (Rama I) to protect the new capital. As the city expanded during the reign of King Chulalongkorn (Rama V), these fortifications were gradually dismantled.

Construction of Chak Phet Road began on 28 September 1898, and was carried out in two phases. The first phase ran from Pom Chak Phet beside Wat Ratchaburana to Pak Khlong Talat. The second phase extended from Pom Chak Phet to the intersection with Yaowarat, Maha Chai, and Phiraphong Roads, near Pom Maha Chai, today known as Wang Burapha Intersection, as well as Phahurat Road. Beyond this point, the route continues as Maha Chai Road. Both segments are designated as one-way traffic routes.

Although relatively short, Chak Phet Road has long served as an important commercial artery, passing through or near several notable landmarks and trade zones, including the King Rama I Memorial, Memorial Bridge,Suankularb Wittayalai School,Pak Khlong Talat, Charoenrat 31 Bridge, the end of Ban Mo Road, Chao Mae Thapthim Shrine, Gurdwara Sri Guru Singh Sabha, Phahurat, Saphan Han, and Wang Burapha.
