= Tha Tien =

Coordinates: 13°44′46.9″N 100°29′27.6″E

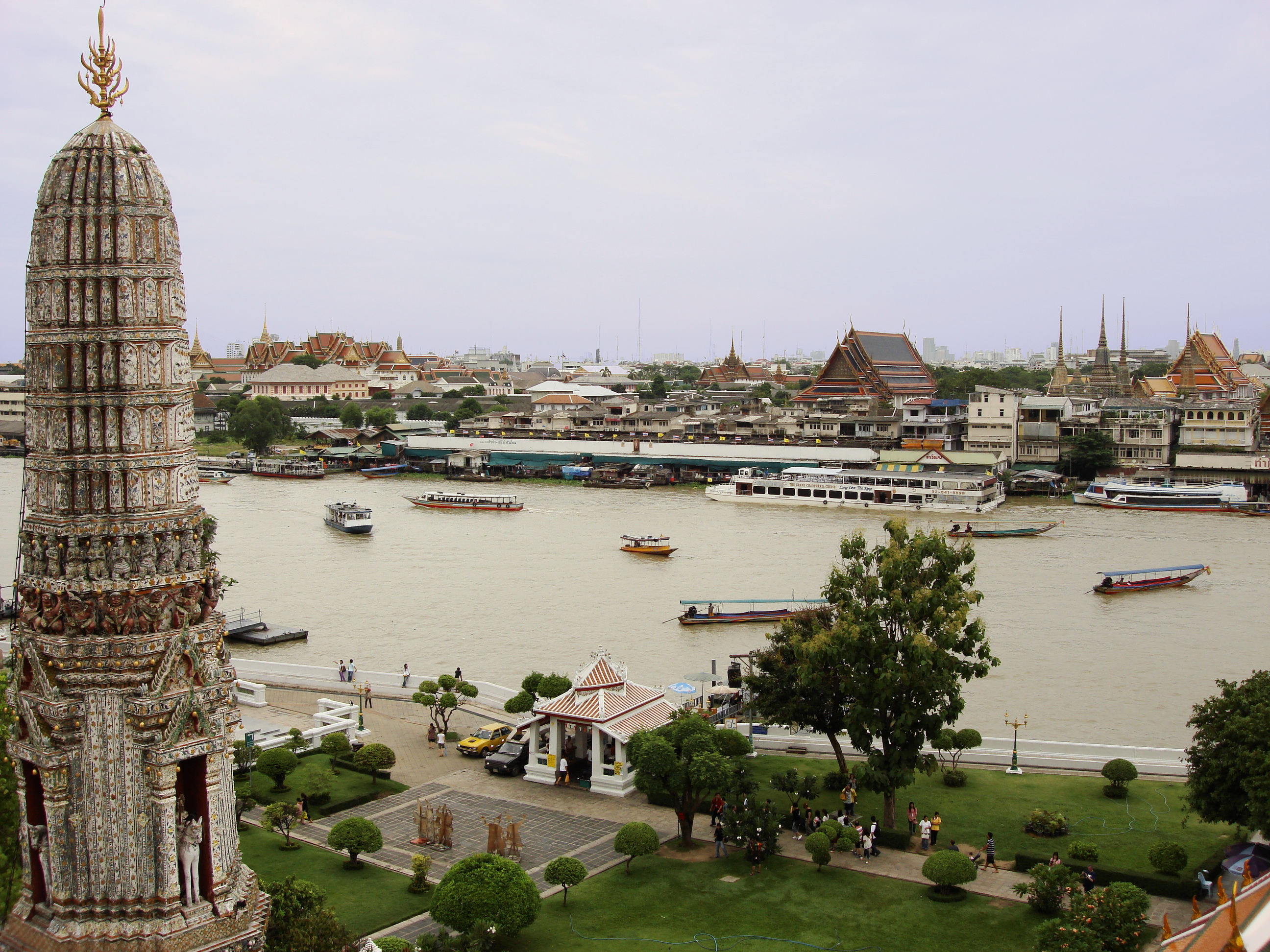
A view from the prang of Wat Arun, looking across the Chao Phraya River to the opposite bank, where Tha Tien lies (2010)

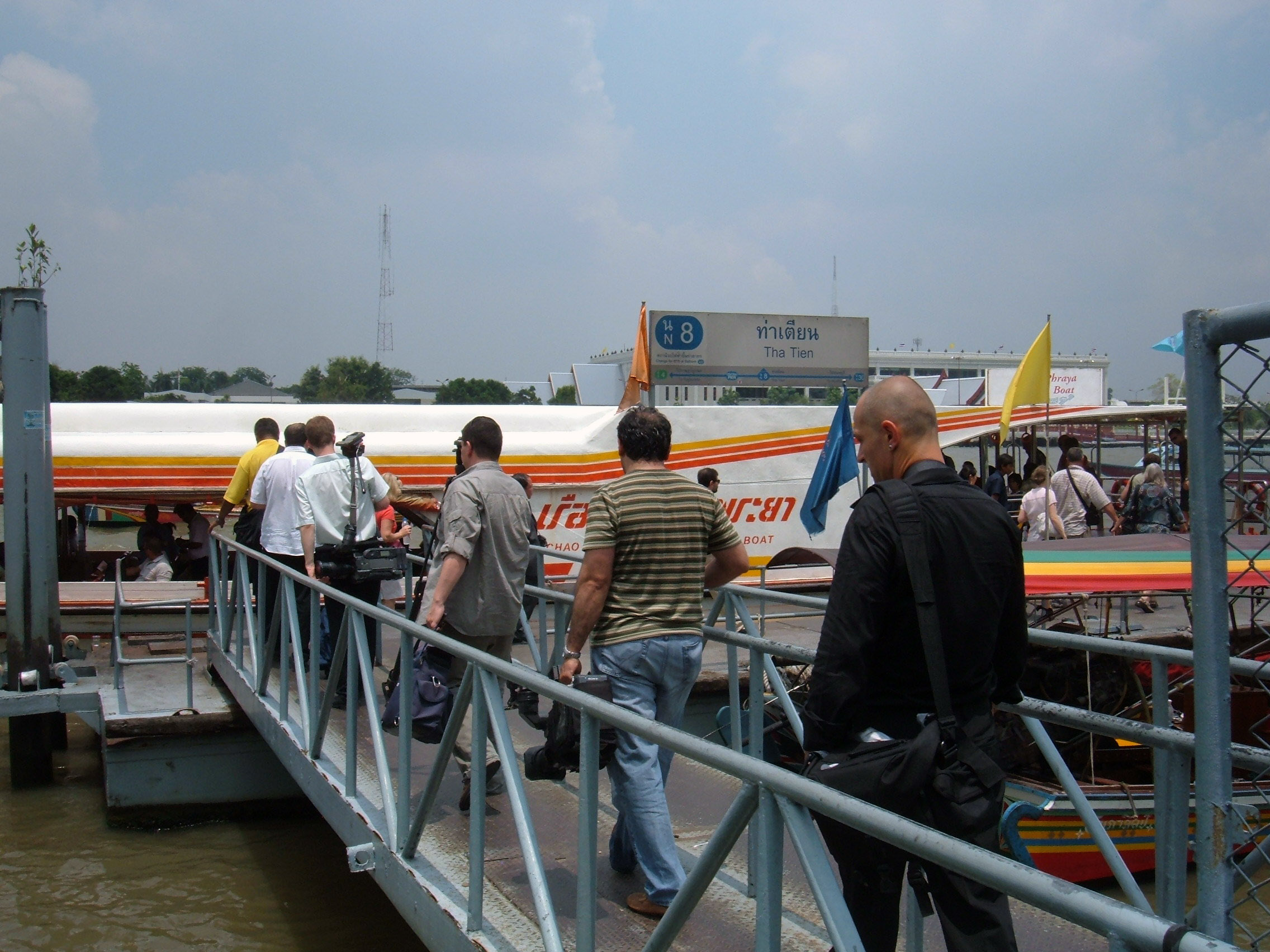
Foreign tourists boarding Chao Phraya Express Boat at Tha Tien Pier (N8) in 2007

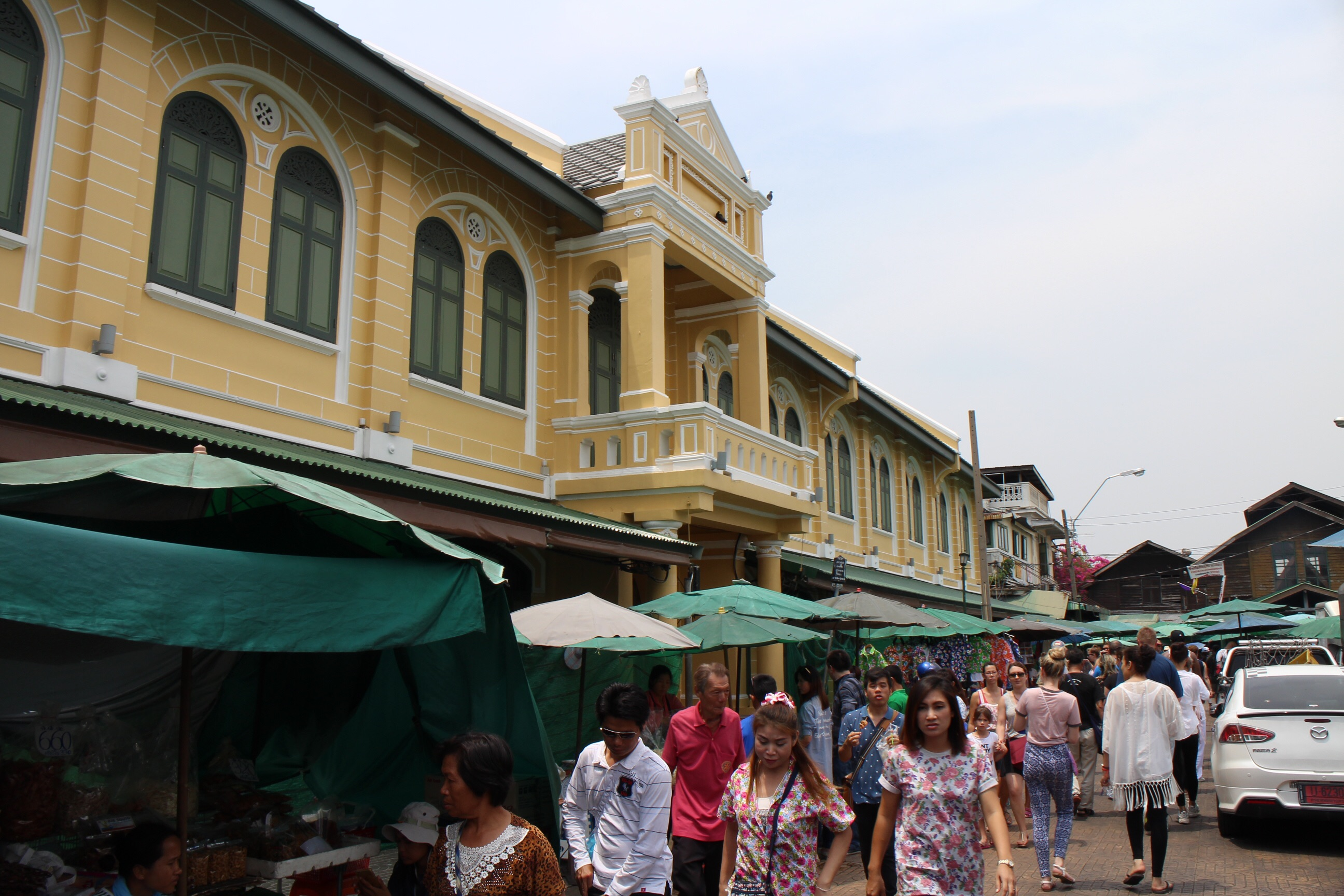
Entrance to Tha Tien in 2015

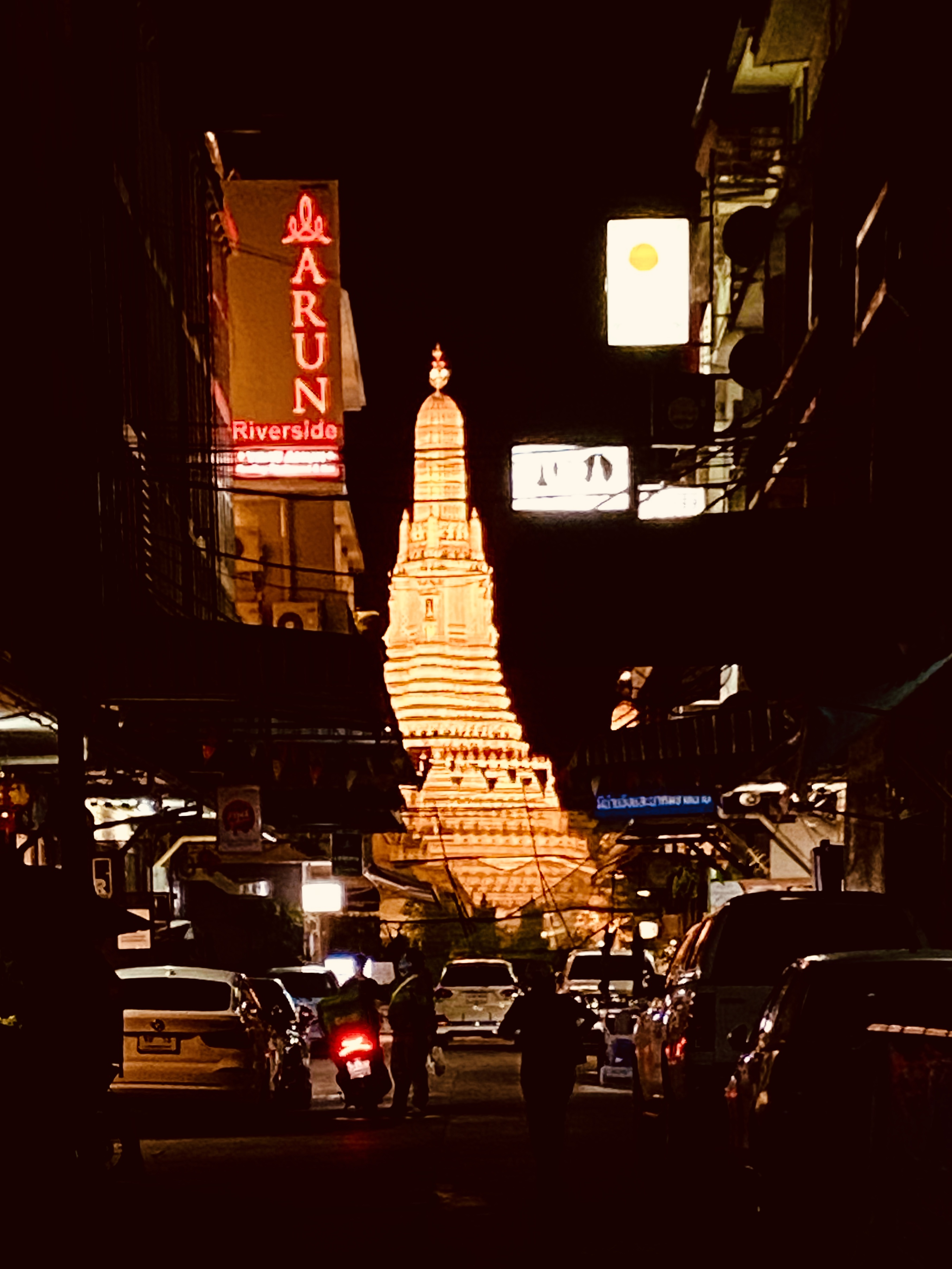
The prang of Wat Arun at night, clearly seen from Soi Tha Ruea Daeng in Tha Tien (2020)

Tha Tien, also written as Tha Tian (Thai: ท่าเตียน, pronounced [tʰāː tǐan]) is a historic riverside community along the Chao Phraya River in the Phra Nakhon district, located on Rattanakosin Island, at the rear of the Grand Palace and Wat Pho, which are adjacent to each other. It has long been renowned as a commercial district with a history of over 200 years, as well as a pier for passenger boats and ferries.

== History and naming ==
The exact age of Tha Tien as a community is unknown, but it can be traced back at least to the Ayutthaya period. The name "Bang Chin" (บางจีน, lit. 'Chinatown') appears in a travelogue by Mom Pimsen, suggesting that this area was once a Chinese settlement. Later, during the Rattanakosin era, when King Rama I ascended the throne in 1782, he moved the capital from the Thonburi side across the river to Phra Nakhon. He then relocated the Chinese residents who had lived in this area to settle in Sampheng, further south along the riverbank, approximately 4 km (2.5 mi) away (present-day Bangkok's Chinatown), in order to build the new city of Bangkok, including the Grand Palace and Wat Phra Kaew. Thus, Tha Tien came into existence.

The origin of the name "Tha Tien" is also unknown, and its meaning remains uncertain. The most widely accepted theory is that it derives from the word "Ha Tien," a port town in southern Vietnam (present-day Hà Tiên in An Giang province), as this area was once settled by Annamese immigrants from the Thonburi period through the early Rattanakosin era. The landscape of the area was thought to resemble that of their hometown. Other explanations have also been suggested. For example, a great fire during the reign of King Rama IV reportedly flattened the area (with Tha meaning "pier" or "port" and Tien meaning "flat"), though there is no definitive evidence to support this. There is also a famous urban legend about the origin of Tha Tien: it is said that a giant guarding the sanctuary of Wat Pho (on the Phra Nakhon side) borrowed money from a giant at the gate of Wat Arun (on the Thonburi side). When the debt was refused, a fierce battle broke out along the Chao Phraya River near Phra Nakhon, leveling the area completely. The conflict was eventually resolved by a yogi—or, according to some versions, by a giant from Wat Phra Kaew who intervened.

== Marketplace and piers ==
The market and community of Tha Tien began to emerge alongside the establishment of the Grand Palace. This area was once the site of royal residences and palaces for several of the king's descendants, as evidenced by archaeological findings uncovered during the construction of the nearby Sanam Chai MRT station (BL31). Tha Tien also served as a rear entrance to the Grand Palace, allowing the king's consorts and female attendants to enter and exit (Note: According to a popular local account, the phrase "chao-chu Pratu Din" (เจ้าชู้ประตูดิน, "a brazen womanizer") may be linked to an area near Tha Tien. At the rear of the Grand Palace, there was a small gate known as "Pratu Chong Kut," (ประตูช่องกุด) but it was commonly referred to as "Pratu Din" (ประตูดิน, lit. 'the earthen gate') due to a mound of earth located nearby. This gate was used by royal consorts and female attendants to exit the palace and shop at Tha Tien market. As a result, young men would often gather around the entrance, waiting to flirt with or court the women, giving rise to the expression associated with openly flirtatious behavior.) to shop at the Tha Tien market, which at that time was renowned for its flowers and handmade goods, such as embroidery and floral crafts, traditionally made by women, which is considered one of the first land-based markets in Bangkok. It was then known as "Talat Thai Sanom" (ตลาดท้ายสนม, lit. 'the inner court market') or "Talat Thai Wang" (ตลาดท้ายวัง, lit. 'the rear palace market'), and its area extended to what is now Thai Wang Road, a narrow lane running alongside the Grand Palace that connects Sanam Chai Road and Maha Rat Road, the latter of which passes through the Tha Tien area. During the reign of King Rama V, Tha Tien became a bustling hub, serving as a center for wholesale trade in a wide range of goods, including agricultural products and oil. However, it was especially renowned for dried seafood, such as dried fish and dried squid. In the same period, the area was also home to Thailand's first large Western-style theatre, known as the "Siamese Theatre", which staged Thai performances using Western theatrical standards and charged admission fees. It was initially operated by Phraya Mahindrasakdi Dhamrong (Pheng Penkul) and was later passed on to his grandson, Benbadhanabongse, Prince of Phichai. The theatre was subsequently renamed the "Prince Theatre". (Note: Prince Theatre operated on a limited schedule, staging performances only during the waxing moon period, for just one week each month. This gave rise to the Thai colloquial term "wik" (วิก), derived from the English word "week." The term has since become widely used in Thai to refer to a theatre or place of performance, and is even applied to television stations when referring to viewing shows or films.) It also functioned as a pier for passenger boats traveling to various provinces in the central region, including Bang Bua Thong, Nonthaburi, Suphan Buri, Ayutthaya, Chai Nat, and Nakhon Sawan.

The shophouses along the roads were built in Neoclassical architectural style, extending toward the nearby Tha Chang area. During the reign of King Rama VI, Tha Tien was designated as a tambon (subdistrict) within the Amphoe Phra Ratchawang (present-day Phra Nakhon district). One of its most famous piers is Tha Rong Mo (ท่าโรงโม่, lit. 'mill pier'), named after its former location, which once housed a cement and stone mill.

== Currently ==
Over time, the bustling activity of Tha Tien gradually declined as new markets emerged nearby and gained greater popularity, most notably Pak Khlong Talat. During the era when Field Marshal Plaek Phibunsongkhram served as Prime Minister, the Tha Tien market was relocated and merged with Pak Khlong Talat to consolidate the city's markets and maintain cleanliness in Bangkok. As a result, Tha Tien entered a period of relative quiet and decline.

Today, Tha Tien and the Tha Tien market have been renovated and developed into a historic and cultural tourist destination. Numerous restaurants and shops now cater to visitors. The area also features a ferry pier to Wat Arun and a pier (N8) for the Chao Phraya Express Boat, which travels to destinations in Nonthaburi Pier (N30) and Pak Kret Pier (N33) in Nonthaburi province. The Chao Phraya Express Boat pier service operates from Monday to Friday, between 06:00 and 19:00.

== See more ==
- Tha Tian Market
- Tah Tien, 1973 Thai monster film based on the origin of Tha Tien
