= Tha Tian Market =

Tha Tian's Line of Buildings

Coordinates: 13°44′46.9″N 100°29′27.6″E

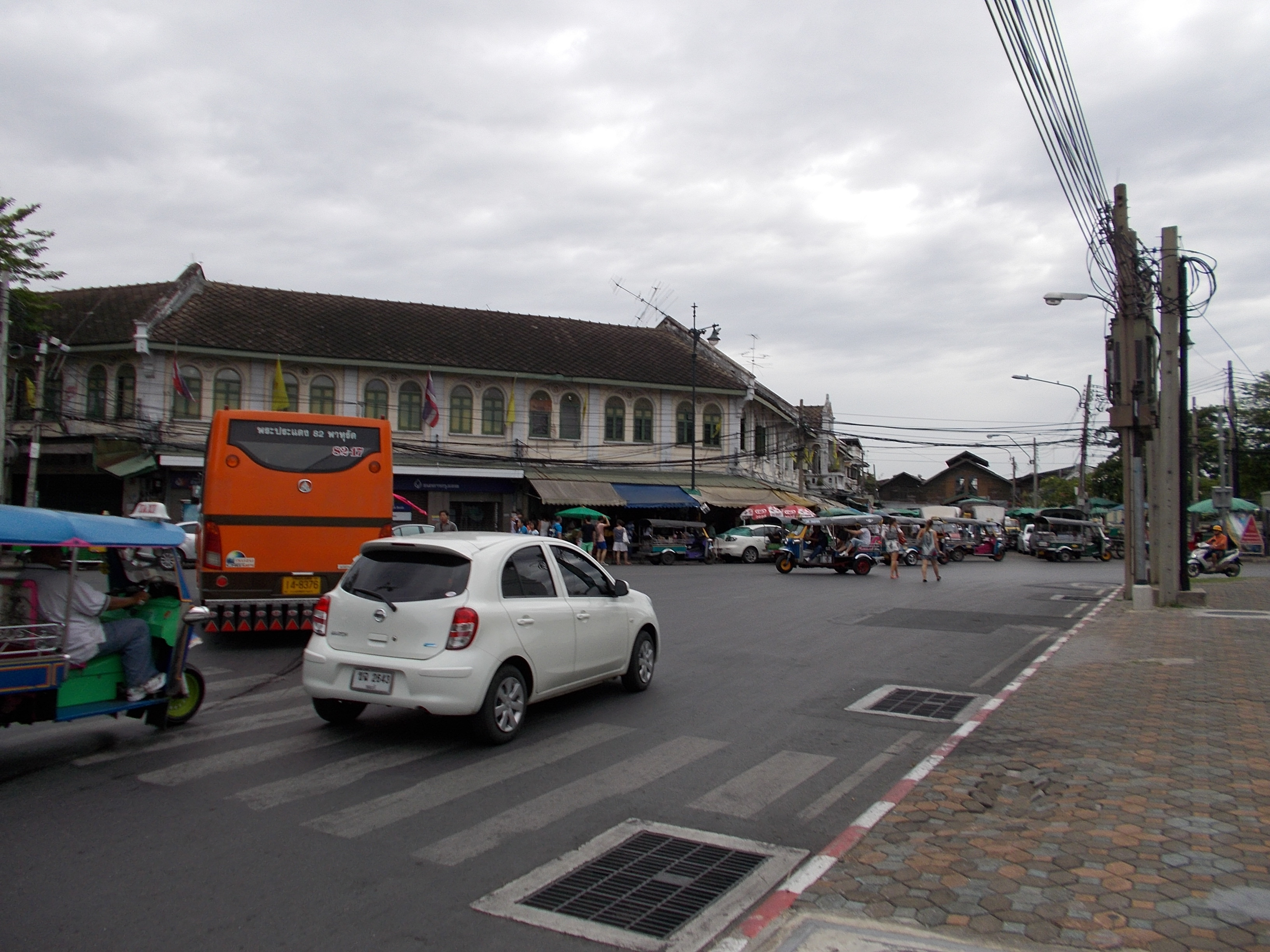
Row of shophouses in the area of Tha Tian Market

Tha Tian Market (Thai: ตลาดท่าเตียน, RTGS: Talat Tha Tian, pronounced [tā.làːt tʰâː tīa̯n]), is one of famous historical ordinary community market in the Phra Nakhon District, Bangkok, Thailand. It is on Rattanakosin Island, located near the Grand Palace – next to Wat Pho, by Chao Phraya River. It has Tha Tian Pier next to the market. It is also known as culture food market that sells dried salted seafood products and wholesale products (Dailynews, 2014; River, n.d.). Tha tian market was the biggest trading center of Chao Phraya River on 17th - 18th century in Rattanakosin era (River, n.d.; In-Jan, 2015).

== History ==
Tha Tian Market is one of famous historical ordinary community market on Rattanakosin Island in 17th century. In the early of Rattanakosin era, a floating market took place on the Tha Tian market. (Dailynews, 2014) During the reign of Rama I till Rama IV (1782–1868), Thais were still considered as the social members of ‘water community’ due mainly to their settlements along the shores of Chao Phraya River, canals and waterways. (Tha Tian community also one of water community). There were also temples, palaces, government office and residents of noblemen situated on plots of Rattanakosin Island. At that time, Tha Tian market was a combination of ‘Thai Wang market’ and ‘floating market’ that sell both fresh and dried food, clothes, goods and items for daily life. For floating market, seller, either retailers or wholesalers, were on rafts and in vending boats. For Thai Wang market, it was only stalls, placed in the areas rented from the members of the royal family, noblemen or temple, reselling foods and goods bought from floating markets. (In-Jan, 2015)

Later, after the Bowring Treaty, in 1855, Siam engaged more in international trade. A change in economic forms resulted in that of urban development in which the ‘Land’ community was more emphasized than the ‘Water’ one. Afterwards, in reign Rama V (1868–1910), with new more roads, more and more people lived on land, roads, instead of waterways, become a major route of trades. The King ordered to build U shape shop houses with their fronts facing the streets. These shop houses were for rent so that people were able to trade, and move the fresh market into the center of U shape shop houses building to cover the unpleasant existing view of the fresh market but there are still some stalls left on the side of Tha Tian area which made that area still popular and crowded.

At that time, Tha Tian was still considered as the largest market in the early Rattanakosin era. It encompassed the area up to Pak Khlong Khu Muang Derm, which was another large market. This market was previously known as ‘Talat Pak Khlong’ or ‘Pak Khlong Talat’ up to the present time. Both markets were center for goods for major towns in the northern and southern regions, including those imported from China. However, there was another neighboring small market name ‘Morakot market’ which was built in parallel with Tha Tian market. The Morakot Market included a brick and mortar shop house mixed with wooden shop houses. It was an open market that regarded as Siam’s most prosperous and wealthy market with every products available with 24 hours in World War II. As it was along the riverside and connected with a largest and most active pier in Tha Tian area, the market was fully occupied space and shops were distributing both wholesale and retail goods which included fresh foods and items for daily life. (In-Jan, 2015)

In 1963, the Morakot Market was on great fire, it destroyed and burned down everything in Tha Tian area. After that, it was replaced by shop houses and a small market of wholesale and retail dried salted seafood products in the area of U shape building, which built in Rama V, connected to Maha Rat Road and next to Tha Tian pier. Tha Tian market still remains in its area until now in Tha Tian community (Dailynews, 2014; In-Jan, 2015).
