= Territorial Defense Command =

Coordinates: 13°44′49″N 100°29′42″E

Territorial Defence Department (1948–2001) Army Reserve Command (2001–2009) Territorial Defense Command (2009–present)
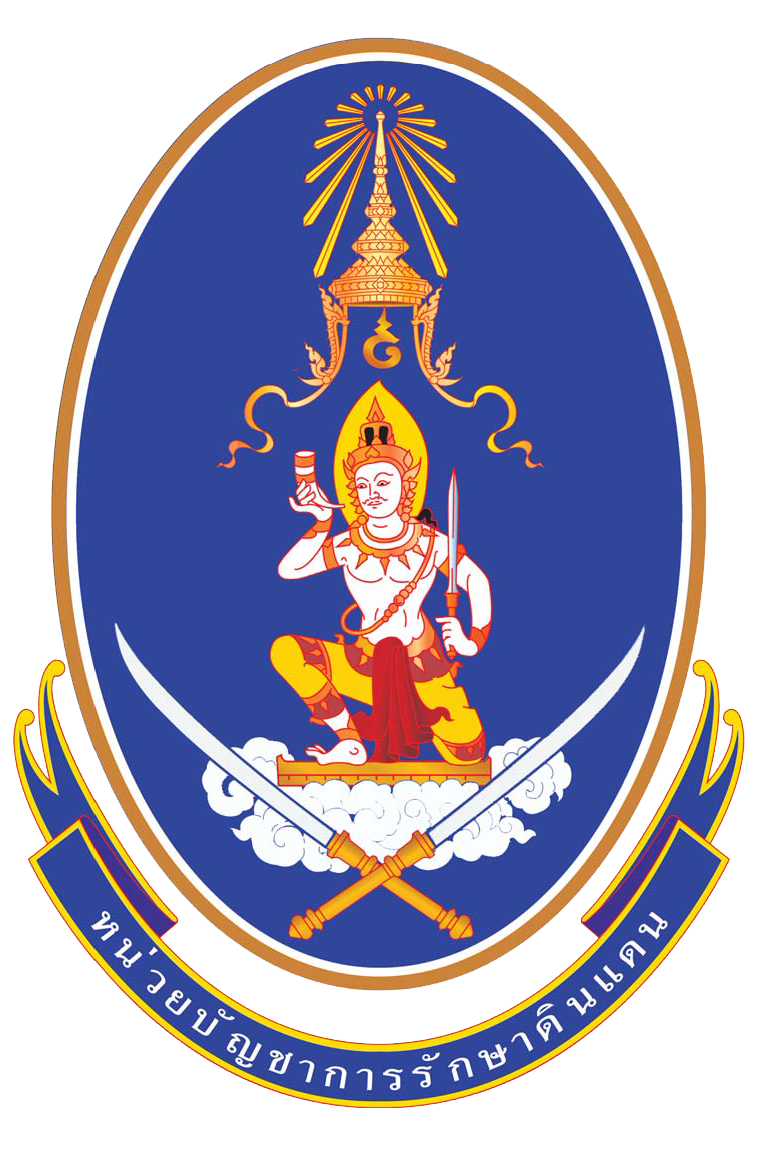
- Unit Insignia
- Founded: 4 February 1948
- Country: Thailand
- Branch: Royal Thai Army
- Part of: Royal Thai Army
- Website: https://www.tdc.mi.th/index.html

Commanders
- Current commander: Lieutenant General Watcharin Muthasin

The Territorial Defense Command (Thai: หน่วยบัญชาการรักษาดินแดน), known as the Army Reserve Command (หน่วยบัญชาการกำลังสำรอง) from 2001–2009 and the Territorial Defence Department (กรมการรักษาดินแดน) before that, is a department of the Royal Thai Army. It is responsible for the management of the country's reserve affairs, including the training of Territorial Defence Students.

Its headquarters is located on the corner of Sanam Chai and Charoen Krung roads. Its main building, a two-storey neoclassical structure, was built in 1922, and is listed as a registered ancient monument.

== History ==
The Territorial Defense Command, established from the 'Kingdom's Territory Defense' act in B.E. 2491 (1948), was formed in the aftermath of the coup d'état of B.E. 2490. Its creation aimed to facilitate civilian participation in national defense and to reduce military expenditures.

Later, Territorial Defence Students received the benefit of exemption from conscription.

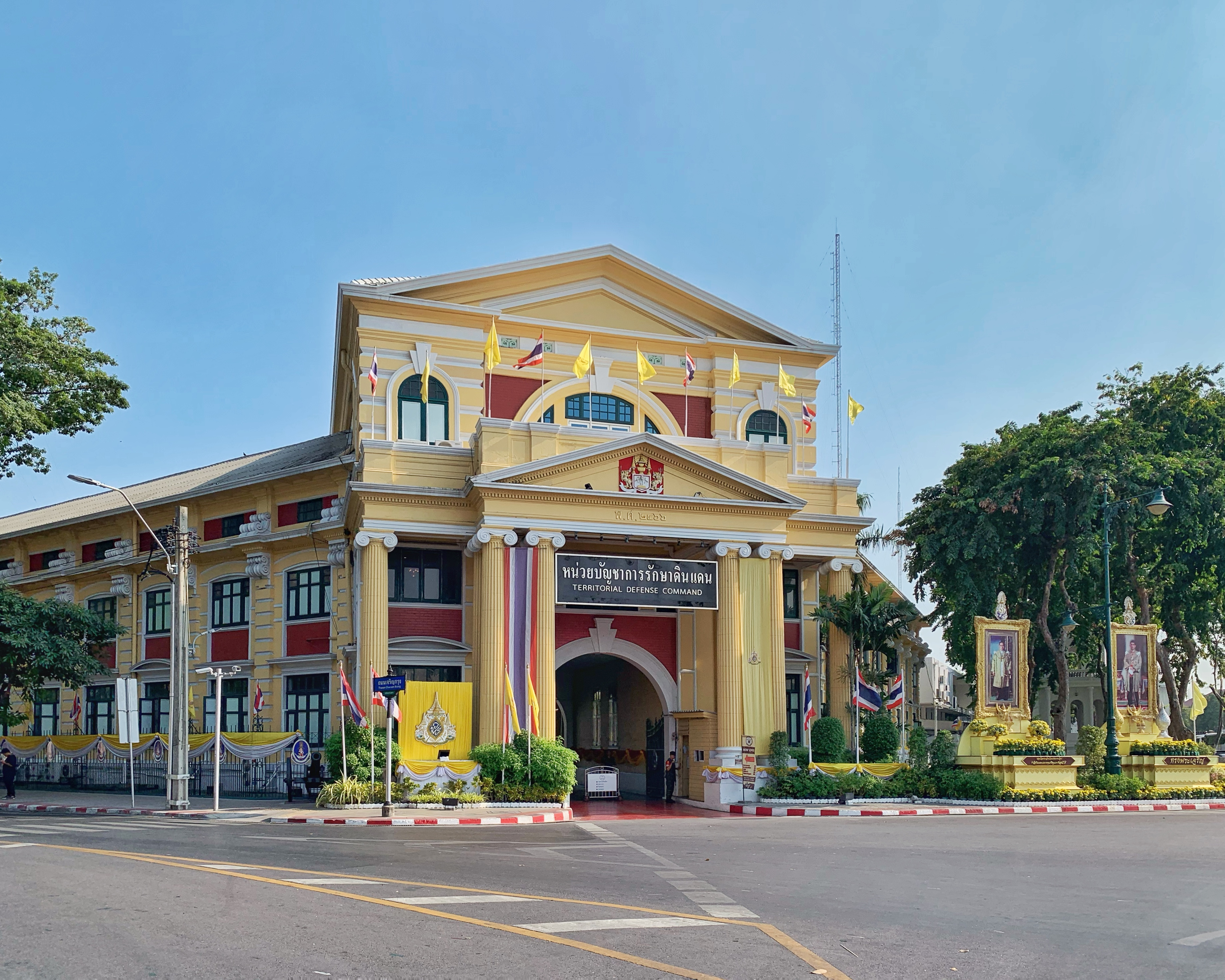
The Territorial Defense Command headquarters

== Affiliated agencies ==
- Reserve Affairs School, Army Reserve Center
- Territorial Defense School, Army Reserve Training Center
- Infantry Battalion, Territorial Defense Command
- Khao Chon Kai Territorial Defence Student-Training Camp
- Army Reserve Training Center
- Army Reserve Center
