= Wang Burapha Phirom subdistrict =

Coordinates: 13°44′42.15″N 100°30′09.42″E

Wang Burapha Phirom วังบูรพาภิรมย์
- Khwaeng
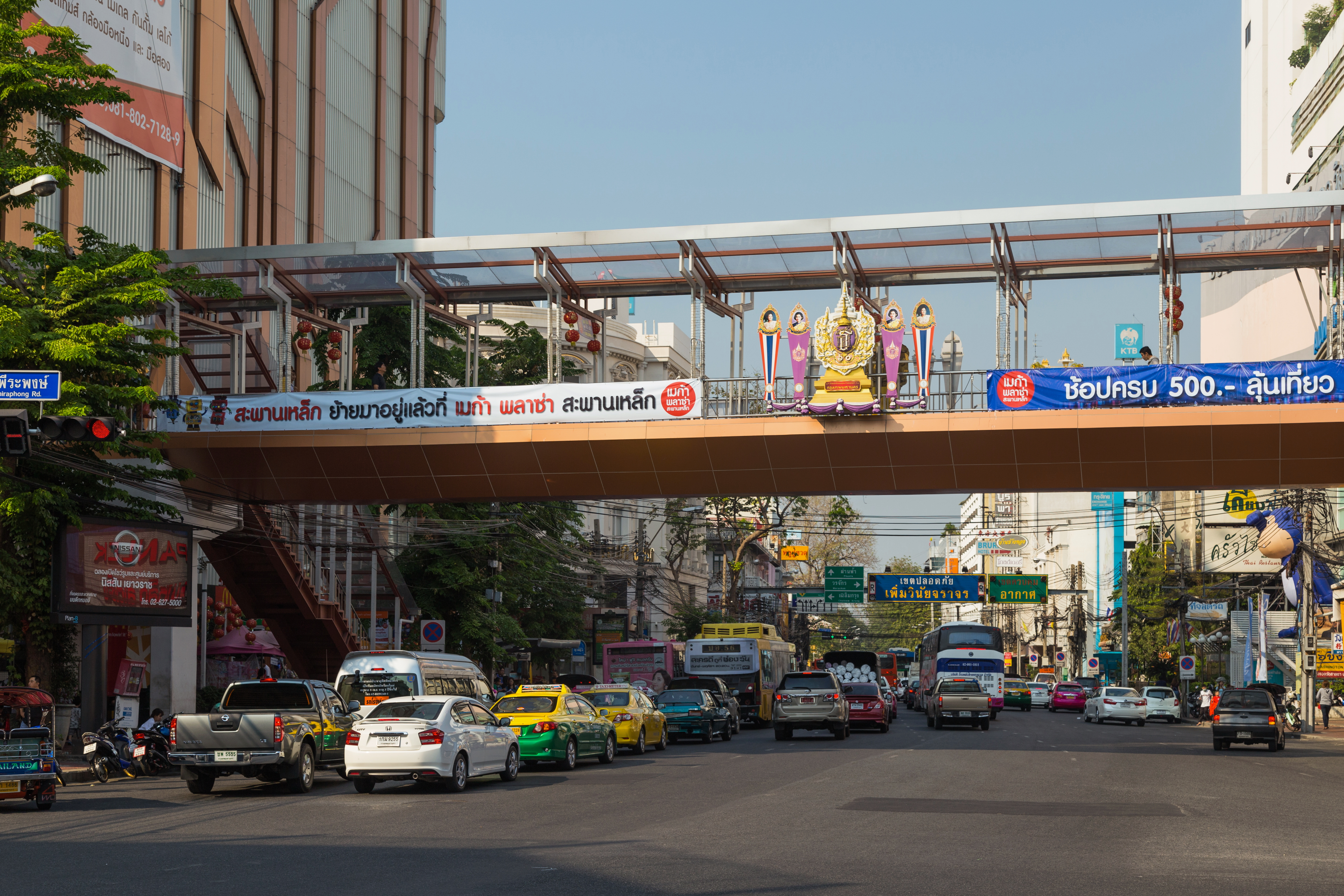
- Wang Burapha Intersection in front of Mega Plaza Saphan Lek, where Chak Phet meets Yaowarat, Phiraphong, and Maha Chai Roads

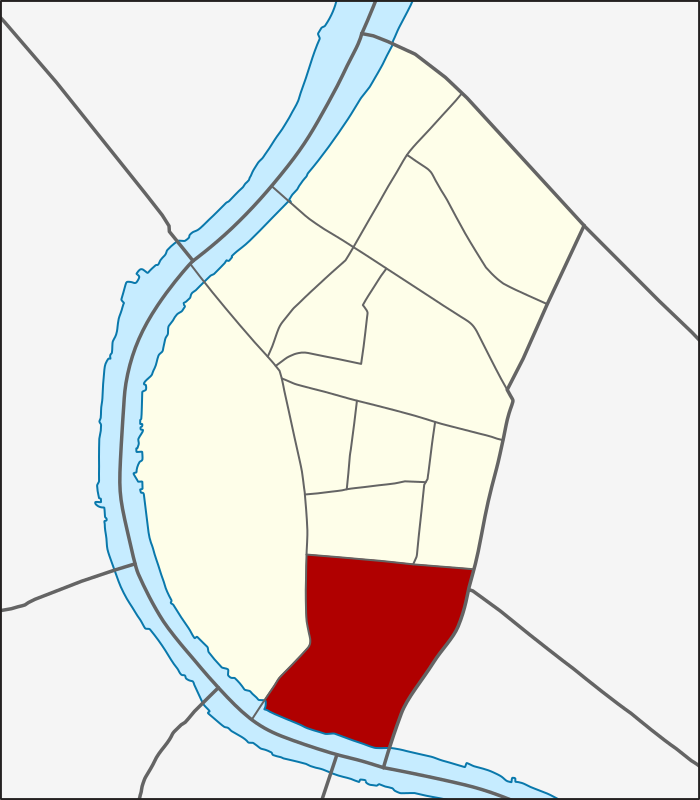
- Location in Phra Nakhon District
- Country: Thailand
- Province: Bangkok
- Khet: Phra Nakhon

Area
  - Total: 0.720 km^{2} (0.278 sq mi)

Population (2017)
  - Total: 11,427
- Time zone: UTC+7 (ICT)
- Postal code: 10200
- TIS 1099: 100102

Wang Burapha Phirom is a khwaeng (subdistrict) of Phra Nakhon District, in Bangkok, Thailand. In 2017 it had a total population of 11,427 people.

== History ==
Its name is after Wang Burapha Phirom, a former palace of Prince Bhanurangsi Savangwongse. The palace was demolished in the 1950s to build a shopping district and three cinemas in the name of "Wang Burapha". Wang Burapha can be considered as the centre of youngsters of that era comparable to Siam Square in present.

During King Rama V's reign, the area was named "Tambon Pak Khlong Talat" eponymous Pak Khlong Talat, a large local wet market by the Chao Phraya River and Khlong Lot.

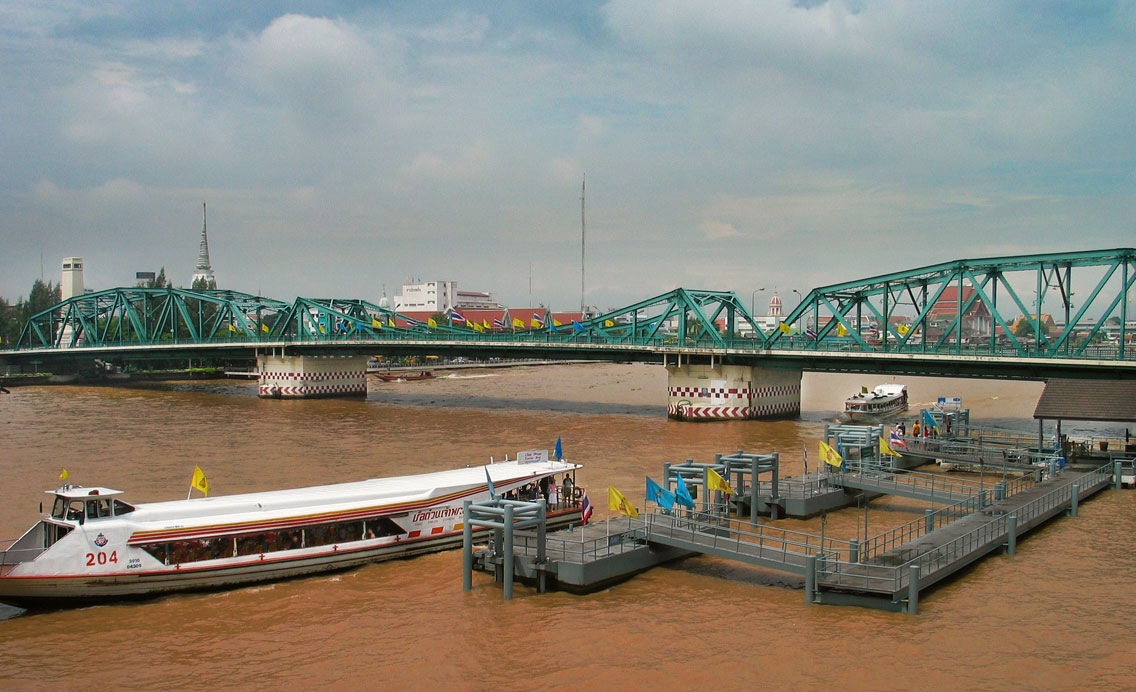
Memorial Bridge and Memorial Bridge Pier (N6) that serves as stop for Chao Phraya Express Boat

Currently, the palace location has become a Mega Plaza Saphan Lek, the department store that became the new hub of various kinds of toys and models after nearby Saphan Lek and Khlong Thom was rezoned by Bangkok Metropolitan Administration (BMA) in 2015.

== Geography ==
Wang Burapha Phirom is the southernmost part of Phra Nakhon District. The lower area is entirely adjacent to the Chao Phraya River. It can also be considered as the southern end of the double old city moats, Khlong Khu Mueang Doem or colloquially known as Khlong Lot, and Khlong Rop Krung or Khlong Ong Ang. The two moats form a historic area called Rattanakosin Island.
