= Pak Khlong Talat =

Flower market in Bangkok, Thailand

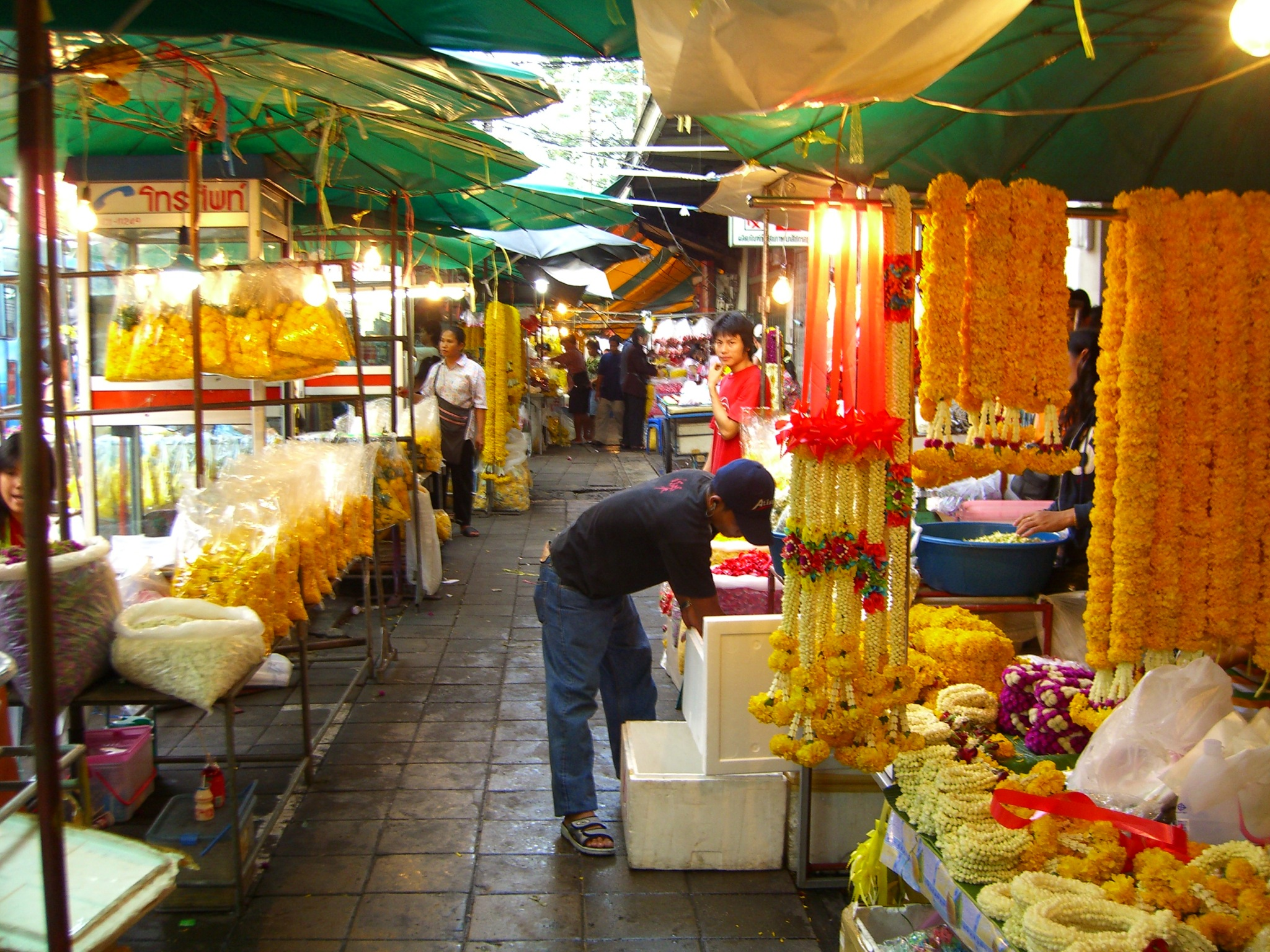
Stalls in Pak Khlong Talat selling phuang malai

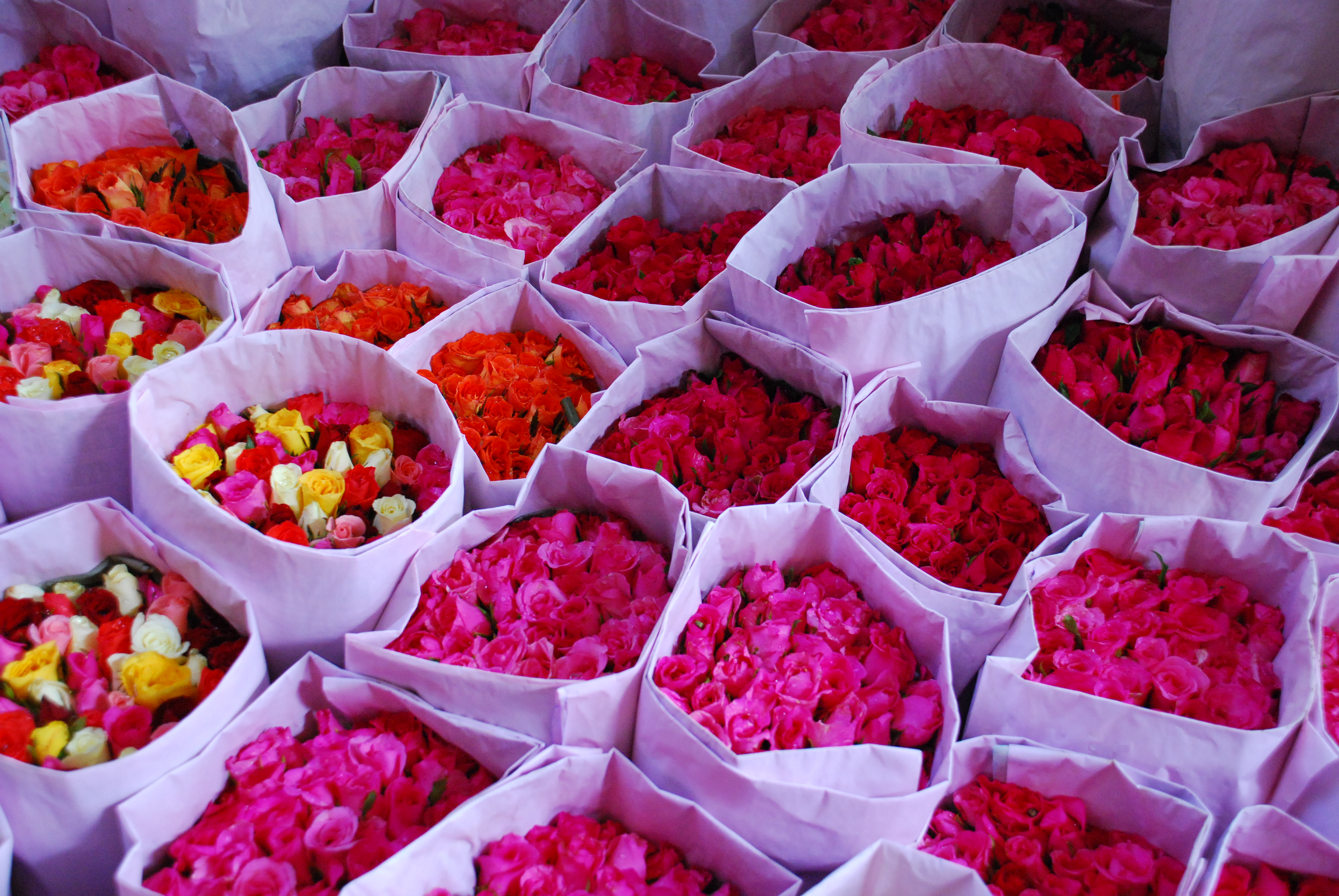
Roses for sale, Pak Khlong Talat

Pak Khlong Talat (Thai: ปากคลองตลาด, pronounced [pàːk kʰlɔ̄ːŋ tā.làːt]) is a market in Wang Burapha Phirom Subdistrict, Phra Nakhon District, Bangkok, Thailand, that sells flowers, fruits, and vegetables. It is the primary flower market of Bangkok and has been cited as a "place of symbolic value" to Bangkok residents. It is on Chak Phet Road and adjacent side-streets, close to Memorial Bridge. Though the market is open 24 hours, it is busiest before dawn, when boats and trucks arrive with flowers from nearby provinces. Its location by Chao Phraya River near the southern end of Khlong Khu Mueang Doem, hence the name 'Pak Khlong Talat', literally means "the market on the mouth of the canal".

== History ==
During the reign of Rama I (1782–1809), the site was a floating market. By the reign of Rama V (1868–1910), it had become a fish market. The fish market was eventually converted to today's produce market, which has existed for over 60 years. The market's focus has shifted from produce to flowers as the Talat Thai market on the outskirts of Bangkok has become a more attractive site for produce wholesaling.

Most of the flowers sold in the market are delivered from Nakhon Pathom, Samut Sakhon, and Samut Songkhram Provinces, though flowers that require cooler growing temperatures may come from as far away as Chiang Mai or Chiang Rai. The market's produce selection is extensive and is delivered from across the country.

The market accommodates both consumers and wholesalers and has a wide variety of customers. Many local florists visit the market in the early morning hours to stock their shops for the coming day. The urban poor who make a living stringing and selling phuang malai (flower garlands) buy sacks of jasmine and marigold blossoms. Though the market is documented in guidebooks, it receives few foreign tourists.

In 2016, outdoor vendors at Pak Khlong Talat were forced to move indoors.

== Yodpiman River Walk ==
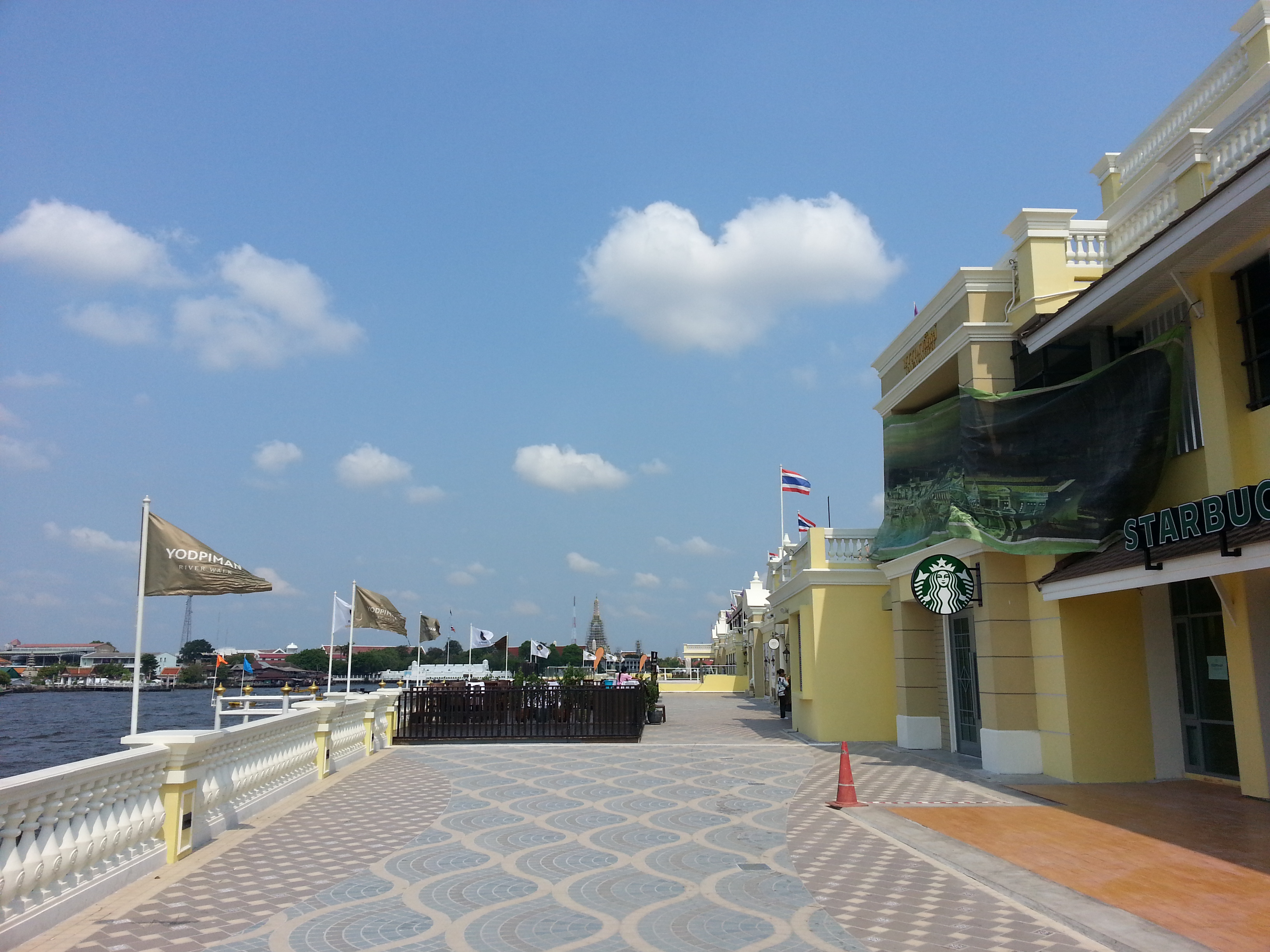
Terrace of Yodpiman by Chao Phraya River in daytime

Yodpiman River Walk, often referred to simply as Yodpiman (Thai: ตลาดยอดพิมาน, pronounced [tā.làːt jɔ̂ːt) pʰí(ʔ).māːn]) is a riverside community mall located on a diversion of the Chao Phraya River near Memorial Bridge. It is regarded as part of Pak Khlong Talat.

Situated directly behind Pak Khlong Talat, the three-storey colonial-style building houses restaurants, cafés, bakeries, banks, souvenir shops, and clothing stores. A riverside terrace provides space for walking and sightseeing along the Chao Phraya. From the terrace, the Thonburi side of the river can be clearly seen, including Santa Cruz Church, the ordination hall (ubosot) of Wat Prayurawongsawat, Wat Kalayanamitr, the three white Thai-style pavilions that serve as the headquarters of the City Law Enforcement Department, Wichai Prasit Fort, and the pagoda (prang) of Wat Arun.

The site was formerly a warehouse and old port that had been in use for around 50–60 years, and since 1961 also served as part of the flower market. In early 2016, the area was redeveloped and opened as a new landmark of Rattanakosin Island and the Chao Phraya River.

Yodpiman River Walk also serves as a pier for the Chao Phraya Express Boat, with the designated pier number N6/1. It is located between Rajinee Pier (N7) and Memorial Bridge Pier (N6), providing convenient access by boat to other nearby attractions such as Tha Tian and Wat Pho. 13°44′30.4″N 100°29′46.7″E

== Transportation ==
The market is served by Bangkok Mass Transit Authority bus lines: 3-35 (1), 3-1 (2), 2-37 (3), 5, 4-48 (7ก), 2-38 (8), 9, 4-10 (42), 3-41 (47), 2-9 (53), 1-38 (60), 2-45 (73), 4-15 (82)

It is close to Sanam Chai Station on the MRT's Blue Line, as well as having access to three piers of the Chao Phraya Express Boat: Memorial Bridge (N6), Yodpiman (N6/1), and Rajini (N7)
