= Wang Burapha =

Neighbourhood in Bangkok, Thailand

Coordinates: 13°44′45″N 100°30′5″E

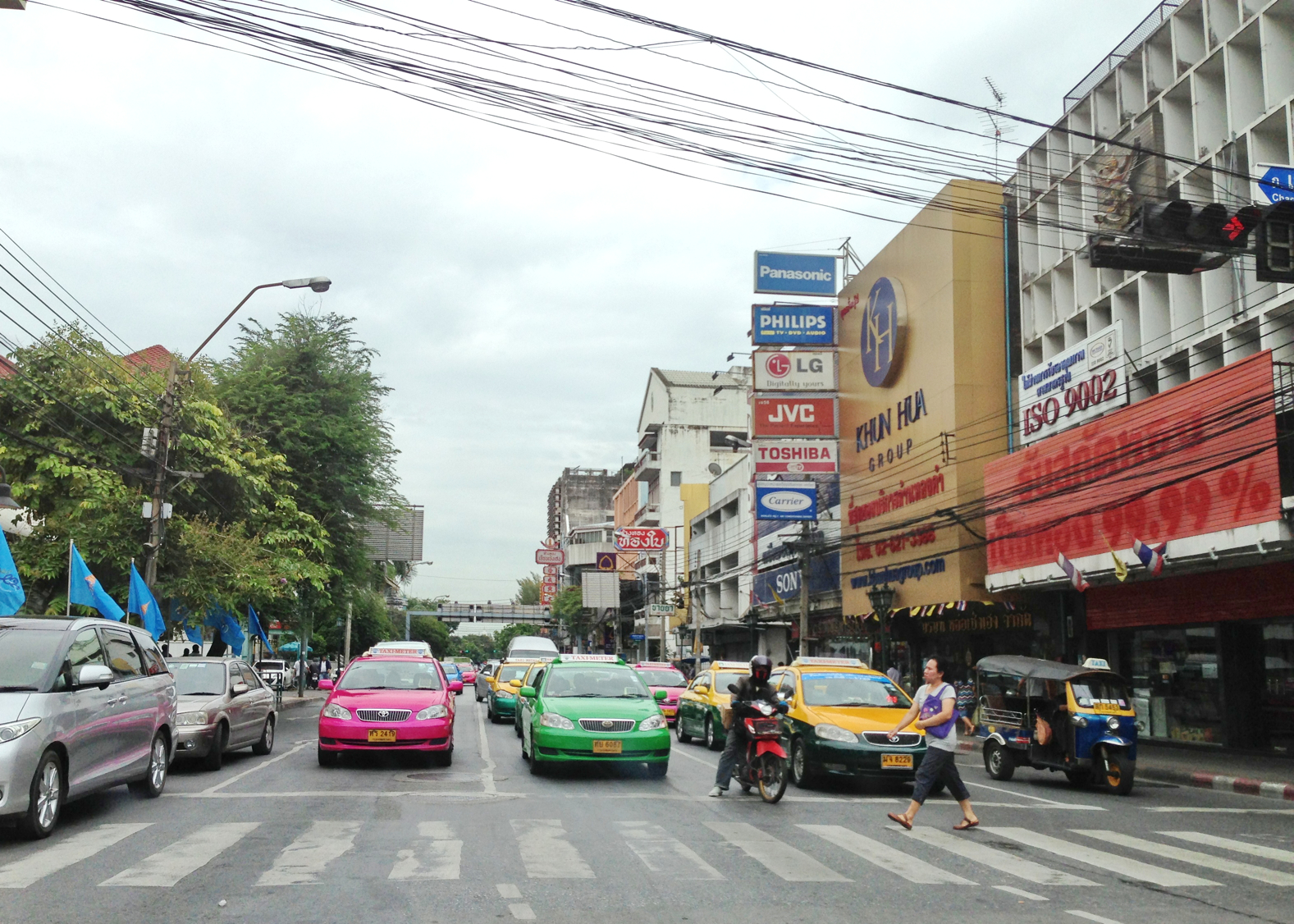
Wang Burapha neighbourhood today

Wang Burapha (Thai: วังบูรพา, pronounced [wāŋ būː.rā.pʰāː]) is a historic neighbourhood in Bangkok, regarded as Thailand's first modern commercial and entertainment district following the 1932 revolution. It is bordered by Charoen Krung, Maha Chai, Phahurat, Tri Phet, and Burapha roads, along with smaller streets branching off the main road such as Phiraphong and Phanu Rangsi. The area sits near the eastern edge of Rattanakosin Island, within Wang Burapha Phirom Subdistrict, Phra Nakhon District. The neighbourhood takes its name from Buraphaphirom Palace, which once stood here before being demolished in the 1950s to make way for commercial development. It became a major business hub and a centre of youth culture during the 1950s and 1960s.

In its heyday, the area was a popular hangout for young people, shaping a new youth identity known as "Koh Lang Wang" (โก๋หลังวัง, [kǒː lǎŋ waŋ]), meaning "gang behind the palace". These youths had a distinct Western-inspired fashion, listened to Elvis Presley or Cliff Richard, and idolised James Dean. At the time, Thai society was influenced by American culture through the presence of G.I.s stationed in Thailand during the Vietnam War. Their stories were later depicted in several Thai films, including Dang Bireley's and Young Gangsters (1997), Born Blood (2002), and The Gangster (2012).

Wang Burapha was once home to three major cinemas: Kings, Queens, and Grand. Nearby stood the Sala Chalermkrung Royal Theatre. The area was also surrounded by bustling markets and foreign-run shops such as Ming Mueang Market, Bampen Bun Market, Bombai, Rattana Mala, Wiang Fah, Lilly, and Yong Tiang Store. It was filled with cafés, restaurants, and photo studios. In 1956, Central Wang Burapha, the first branch of a major department store chain, opened here as a fully integrated and modern shopping destination. At the time, ready-made clothing was not yet widely available, so shoppers would often buy fabrics from nearby Phahurat, well known as a major textile district, and then have their clothes custom-tailored by dressmakers in Wang Burapha. The process could be completed within just two to three hours, allowing customers to pass the time by watching a film at one of the nearby cinemas and making it possible to shop, tailor, and enjoy entertainment all in a single visit.

During New Year festivals, the surrounding streets were closed off and turned into pedestrian zones for grand celebrations. These included concerts, likay performances, and comedy shows, attracting tens of thousands of visitors, some arriving in chartered buses from other provinces. The cinemas screened films through the night. Although a similar event was held at Sanam Luang, it was not as popular as Wang Burapha. The area also served as a major transport hub, functioning as a bus terminal and tram route.

The area's popularity began to wane around 1965 when Siam Square and Ratchaprasong Shopping Centre became new commercial centres. Ming Mueang Market was dismantled in 1978, and Queens, the last remaining cinema, closed in 1990. The Old Siam Plaza was later built on the former site of Ming Mueang Market and opened in 1993. Central Wang Burapha closed in 2008 and was eventually converted into the Chinaworld department store.

Today, Wang Burapha is still known for its legal gun shops, many of which have been in business since before the area became a commercial centre. It also continues to be home to several well-known bookstores. Some old restaurants that date back to the area's golden era are still operating, though the overall atmosphere has grown quieter with time.
