= Trams in Bangkok =

Transport system in Bangkok, Thailand

Bangkok tramway system
- รถรางกรุงเทพ
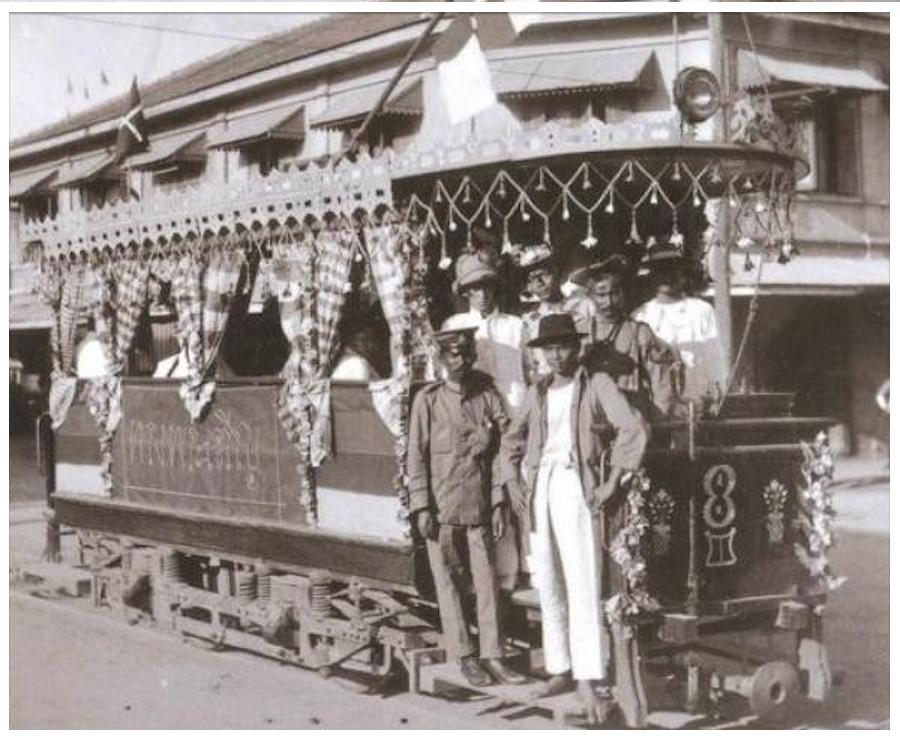
- Tram in Bangkok, 1912

Operation
- Locale: Bangkok, Thailand
- Open: 22 September 1888
- Close: 11 October 1968
- Status: Closed
- Lines: 11

Infrastructure
- Track gauge: 1,000mm metre gauge (electric system), unknown (horse system)
- Electrification: 600 V DC overhead line

Statistics
- Route length: 53.5 km
Horse tram era: 1888–1892
- Status: Closed
- Lines: 1
- Operators: John Lofton (1888-1889); Bangkok Tramways Co. Ltd. (1889-1892)
- Route length: 9.2 km
Electric tram era: 1892–1968
- Status: Closed
- Lines: 11
- Operators: Unspecified Danish Company (1892-1894); Electricity Co. Ltd. (1900-1908); Thai Tram Co. Ltd. (1905-1908); Siam Electricity Co. Ltd. (1908-1927); Thai Electricity Corporation (1927-1950); Bangkok Electrical Co. Ltd. (1950-1968)
- Route length: 53.5 km
Overview
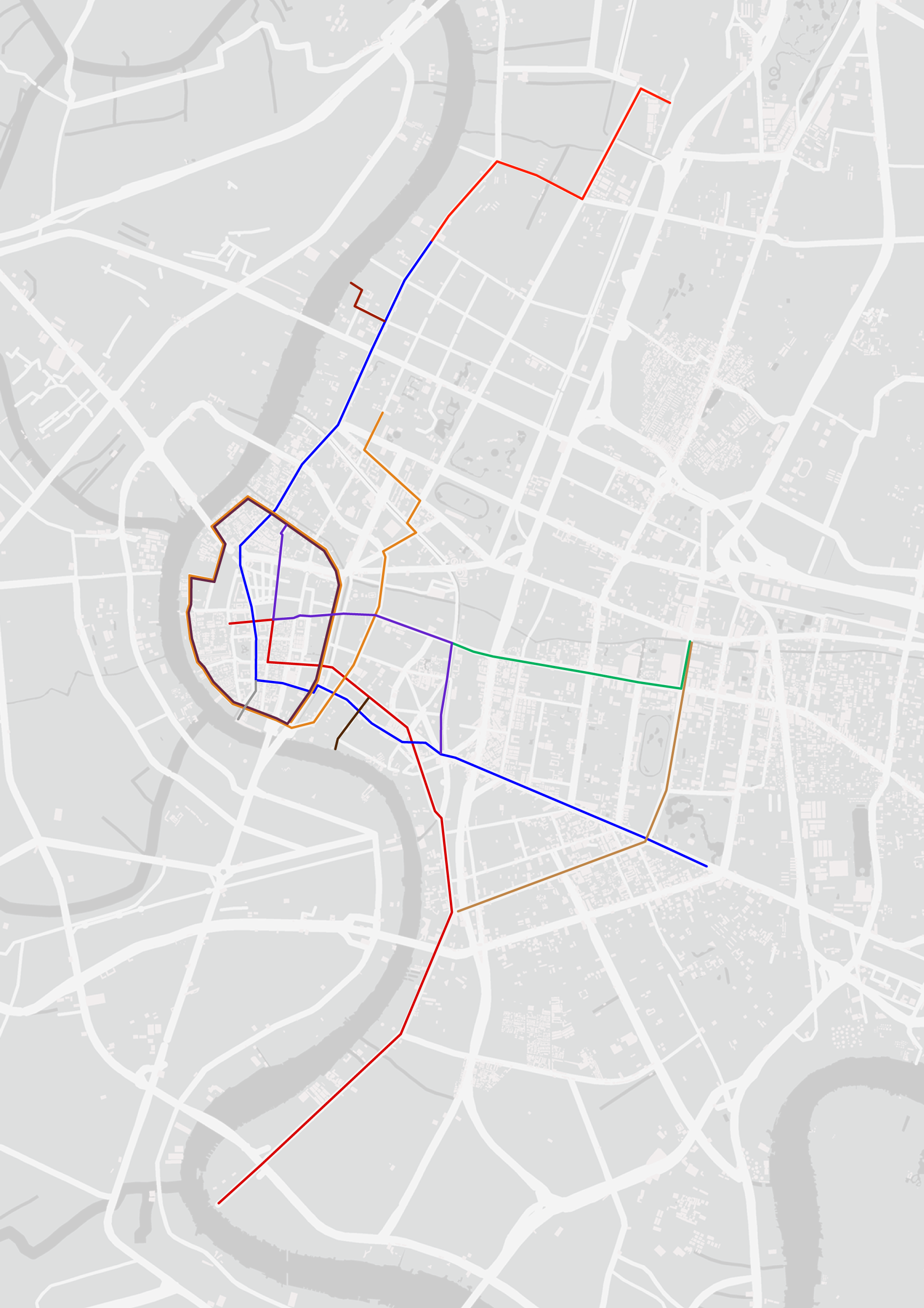

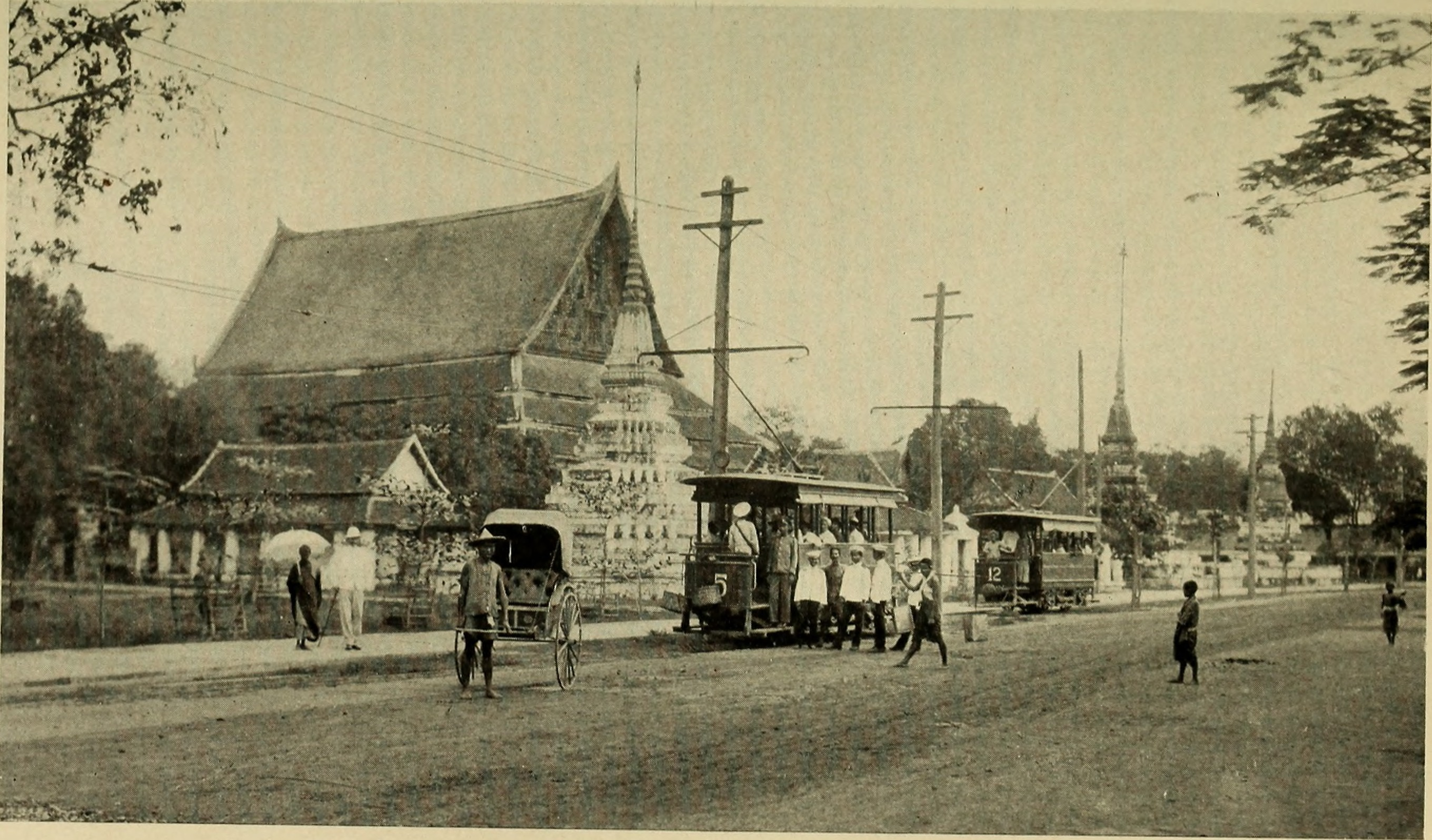
Trams in front of an unspecified temple, 1904

The Bangkok tram system (รถรางกรุงเทพ) was a transport system in Bangkok, Thailand. Its first-generation tram network first operated as a horse tram system, and was eventually converted to electric trams in the late nineteenth century.

== History ==
The first tram line in Bangkok was built on Charoen Krung Road (New Road as it was then known), Thailand's first road to be built by Western techniques. John Lofton, a British naval officer working with the Royal Thai Navy along with a Danish colleague, saw a profitable tram service on the line, considering travel times were significant in getting from one end of the road to another. They surveyed the area for three days before requesting to operate a tram service under a government concession. They received a fifty-year allowance to operate trams on seven routes in 1887 and thus opened the first horse-driven tram line, the Bang Kho Laem Line on Charoen Krung Road on 22 September 1888. It did not gain popularity due to high fares and high sympathy for the horses used. Four horses were used to haul one carriage on the line. Due to significant losses, Lofton sold the business to the Bangkok Tramways Co.Ltd. in 1889. Bangkok Tramways continued to operate at significant losses.

On 23 May 1892, a Danish company took over and electrified the line., with electricity provided by the Electricity Co. Ltd. Eventually, the company was merged into the Siam Electricity Company and thus it became the operator of the line. In 1901, a new tram line - the Samsen Line opened, taking trams to the north of Bangkok. In 1905, a competing company was given rights to operate trams in Bangkok, namely the Thai Tram Co. Ltd. (Rot Rang Thai Co. Ltd.). Thai Tram opened a line, the Dusit Line; a circular loop line surrounding Rattanakosin Island. It was opened on 1 October 1905 in the presence of King Chulalongkorn. Thai Tram's cars were painted red, while Electricity's cars were painted yellow, and thus locally the lines in which they operated were called by their colours, respective to their owners. In 1908, the operations of both companies were merged into the Siam Electricity Co. Ltd. and all trams painted into the same mix of yellow and red. In the 1920s, more lines gradually came into operation around Bangkok. In 1927, operations were transferred again to the Thai Electricity Corporation.

On January 1, 1950, the concession on tram operation ceased and operations were transferred to the government. In 1968, tram services were suspended following discussion that it took up road space, coupled with the significant increase in road traffic, as well as cheaper bus operation on the same line. Tram fares ranged from 10 to 50 satang (100 satang = 1 baht), depending on class.

== Lines ==
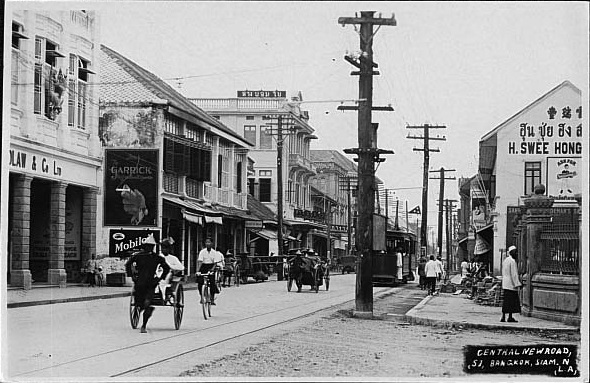
Charoen Krung Road c. 1910s–1920s. A tram with its tracks is visible.

There were 11 tram lines operating on the Bangkok tramway network and are as follows:

1. Bang Kho Laem Line (สายบางคอแหลม) - 9.2 km (5.7 mi), City Pillar - Thanon Tok (1888–1968)
  1. Ran from Bangkok City Pillar Shrine, on Kanlayana Maitri Road, turned at Fueang Nakhon Road and into Charoen Krung Road at Si Kak Phraya Si Intersection, passing Wang Burapha, Wat Mangkon, Si Phraya, Bang Rak, into Bang Kho Laem and terminated at the end of Thanon Tok, where Bangkok Dock Company used to be.
2. Samsen Line (สายสามเสน) - 11.3 km (7.0 mi), Kheaw Khai Ka Pier - Sala Daeng (1901–1968)
  1. Ran from Kheaw Khai Ka Pier in front of the Royal Irrigation Department on Samsen Road, passing Thewet, Bang Lamphu. It entered Atsadang Road, turned into Phahurat Road and into Chinatown's Yaowarat Road, and continued onto Rama IV Road. It passed Bangkok railway station, Sam Yan and into Sala Daeng, terminating at the south side of Lumphini Park.
3. Dusit Line (สายดุสิต) - 11.5 km (7.1 mi), a loop line around Rattanakosin Island, with spur to Thewet (1905–1968)
  1. Ran on Phra Athit Road, Phra Sumen Road, passed Phan Fa Lilat Bridge, continued on Maha Chai Road, turned into Chak Phet Road and passing Pak Khlong Talat. It continued onto Maha Rat Road, behind Wat Pho and the Grand Palace before turning to run in front of Wat Mahathat and the National Museum and joins its origin back at Phra Athit Road. Also consisted of a spur which branched from Chak Phet Road, onto Worachak Road and Chakkraphatdiphong Road. It then turned at Nakhon Sawan Road and onto short sections on Luk Luang Road and Rama V Road, until it ran on Phitsanulok Road, terminating at Thewet.
4. Kamphaeng Mueang Line (สายกำแพงเมือง) - 7.0 km (4.3 mi), a loop line around Rattanakosin Island (around 1920s–1968)
  1. Same loop as Dusit line but operating only within the loop
5. Bang Sue Line (สายบางซื่อ) - 4 km (2.5 mi), Kheaw Khai Ka Pier - Bang Sue railway station (around 1920s–1968)
  1. Ran from Kheaw Khai Ka Pier in front of the Royal Irrigation Department on Samsen Road, turning at Kiak Kai Intersection on Thahan Road. It then turned onto Techawanit Road and terminated in front of Bang Sue railway station.
6. Hua Lamphong Line (สายหัวลำโพง) - 4.4 km (2.7 mi), Bang Lamphu - Hua Lamphong (around 1920s–1968)
  1. Ran from Bang Lamphu on Tanao Road, turning at Bamrung Mueang Road, passing in front of Bangkok City Hall and the Giant Swing, running the entire length of the road, before turning onto Krung Kasem Road. It then ran along Khlong Phadung Krung Kasem, before terminating at Hua Lamphong, adjacent to Bangkok railway station.
7. Silom Line (สายสีลม) - 4.5 km (2.8 mi), Bang Rak - Pratunam (around 1920s–1968)
  1. Ran from Bang Rak Intersection along Silom Road, passing Sala Daeng and onto Ratchadamri Road, passing Ratchaprasong Intersection and terminating at Pratunam Intersection.
8. Pathum Wan Line (สายปทุมวัน) - 4.5 km (2.8 mi), Yot Se - Pratunam (around 1920s–1968)
  1. Ran from Kasat Suek Bridge on Rama I Road, passing National Stadium, Siam Square and turning at Ratchaprasong Intersection and terminating at Pratunam Intersection.
9. Sukhothai Line (สายสุโขทัย) - 0.6 km (0.37 mi), Bang Krabue - Sukhothai Palace (around 1920s–1968)
  1. Branched off Samsen Line. Ran on Sukhothai Road, next to Sukhothai Palace from the intersection with Samsen Road at Vajira Hospital and terminated at the river where the road ends.
10. Atsadang Line (สายอัษฏางค์) - 0.5 km (0.31 mi), Phra Phithak Alley - Atsadang Pier
  1. Branched off Atsadang Line. Ran entirely on Atsadang Road, from its intersection with Phahurat Road to the end of the road at Atsadang (now Rajini) Pier.
11. Ratchawong Line (สายราชวงศ์) - 0.5 km (0.31 mi), Suea Pa - Ratchawong Pier
  1. Branched off Bang Kho Laem Line. Ran entirely on Ratchawong Road from Suea Pa Intersection to Ratchawong Pier

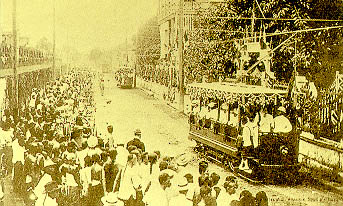
Tram in Bangkok, 1905

== Operations ==
=== Rolling Stock ===
There were two main types of tram, an open-plan wooden tram with cloth curtains and a closed-plan metal tram. All tram cars were separated into first class and second class. Some disused rolling stock were used on the Lopburi tramway system.

=== Signage ===
Tram stop signs were indicated by a red metal triangle with a white star. A green metal triangle with a white star indicated a passing loop stop. The last tram stop sign to be removed from Bangkok streets was on 4 March 2019 on Yaowarat Road in Woeng Nakhon Khasem area by the Metropolitan Electricity Authority due to local engineering work.

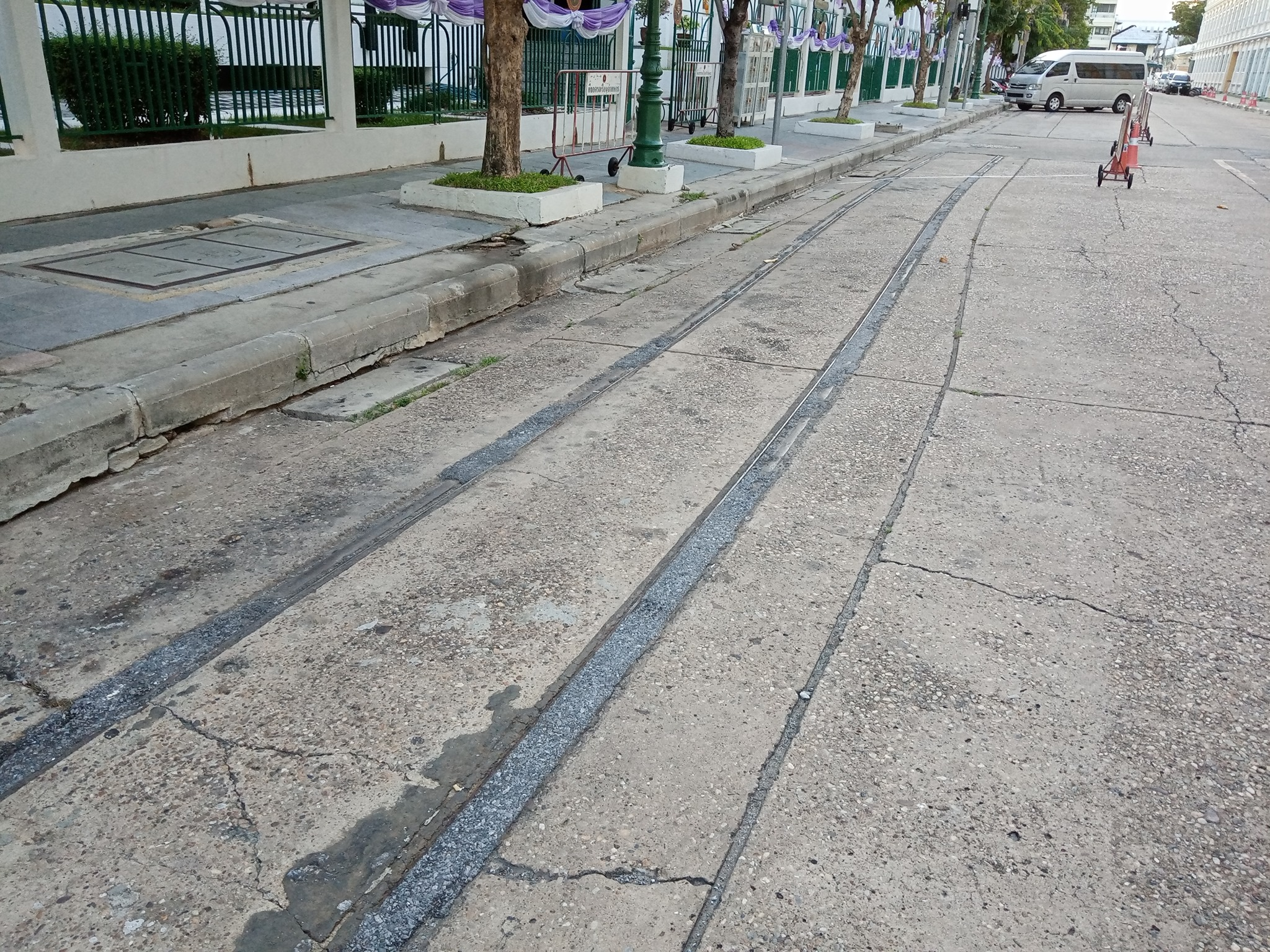
The last tram tracks in beside Bangkok City Pillar Shrine

== Remains ==
At present, the only tracks in Bangkok remaining are of the Bang Kho Laem Line on Lak Mueang Road between Bangkok City Pillar Shrine and Ministry of Defense. Before this, there were more track remains on Charoen Krung Road in front of the Vietnamese temple Wat U Phai Rat Bamrung in Talat Noi quarter. It has been covered with asphalt since 2015.

== See also ==
- Transport in Thailand
- Transport in Bangkok
- Trams in Lopburi
- List of town tramway systems in Asia
