= Trams in Lopburi =

Transit system

Lopburi tramway system
- รถรางลพบุรี

Operation
- Locale: Lopburi, Thailand
- Open: 31 January 1955
- Close: 1 December 1962
- Status: Closed
- Lines: 1
- Owner: Bangkok Electric Works

Infrastructure
- Track gauge: 1,000mm metre gauge

Statistics
- Route length: 6.5 km

The Lopburi tram system (Thai: รถรางลพบุรี) was a transport system in Mueang Lopburi district, Lopburi province, Thailand. It was the only provincial tramway system located outside Bangkok and was operated with electric trams.

== History ==
The Lopburi tramway system was built following the plans of then prime minister Plaek Phibunsongkhram to expand Lopburi into a "military city" and develop the local transportation infrastructure. Further plans to develop tramway systems in other major cities such as Chiang Mai, Nakhon Ratchasima, and Songkhla were also studied, but none were ever constructed. The system was inaugurated by Phibunsongkhram on 31 January 1955, and consisted of a single line running from San Phra Kan to Erawan Intersection, near the present-day King Narai Hospital. Rolling stock used were disused electric trams from Bangkok's tramway. The opening of the line saw significant usage in its early days, and was extended west to Tha Pho Market in the old town area.

=== Decline ===
By 1960, increased bus services in the area, also serving Tha Pho Market and overlapping the tram route meant passenger volumes started to decrease. The scarcity of oil after World War II, meant tram services occasionally had to be suspended, as was the case with some tram lines in Bangkok. This, coupled with the increase in private car ownership in Lopburi meant using trams were slower than going by road, in some cases obstructing traffic as well. After repeated financial losses, the short-lived Lopburi tramway system operated its final services on 1 December 1962.

At present, the only tracks in Lopburi remaining are in the U Rotrang Kao (Former Tram Depot) community, located near Erawan Intersection.

== Operations ==
=== Route Alignment ===
Initially, the line started behind Si Sunthon Roundabout (San Phra Kan) and ran on Narai Maharat Road until Si Suriyothai Roundabout (Sa Kaeo), where it ran along the outer southern semi-circle curve. The line then continues on Narai Maharat Road, crossing Saphan 7 Bridge and reaching the inner circle of Thep Satri Roundabout (King Narai Monument), running adjacent to Lopburi Provincial Hall. The line then turns northward onto Phahonyothin Road, terminating near the 6th Infantry Battalion Camp (now the 31st Infantry Regiment) at Erawan Intersection where Phahonyothin Road intersects with Highway 3016. This route was approximately 4.8 kilometres (3.0 mi).

A west extension to Tha Pho Market was constructed not long after the initial line's opening, although it is not recorded exactly when. The line was extended along the northern semi-circle curve of Si Sunthon Roundabout, crossing the State Railway of Thailand's Northern Line, passing in front of Phra Prang Sam Yot on Prang Sam Yot Road. The route then turned northward near Prang Khaek onto Sura Songkhram Road and terminated at Tha Pho Market near the Lopburi City Pillar Shrine. This resulted in a disputed total route length of 6.5 kilometres (4.0 mi), or 7.2 kilometres (4.5 mi) according to some sources.

=== Ticketing ===
The tram line was separated into two ticketing sections, one between Tha Pho Market and Si Suriyothai Roundabout and another between Si Suriyothai Roundabout to Erawan Intersection. Traveling within each section cost 25 satang. Crossing between sections and traveling the entire line cost 40 satang (100 satang = 1 baht).

== See also ==
- Transport in Thailand
- Trams in Bangkok
- Trams in Asia
- List of town tramway systems in Asia
