= Nightingale–Olympic =

Nightingale Olympic Co., Ltd.
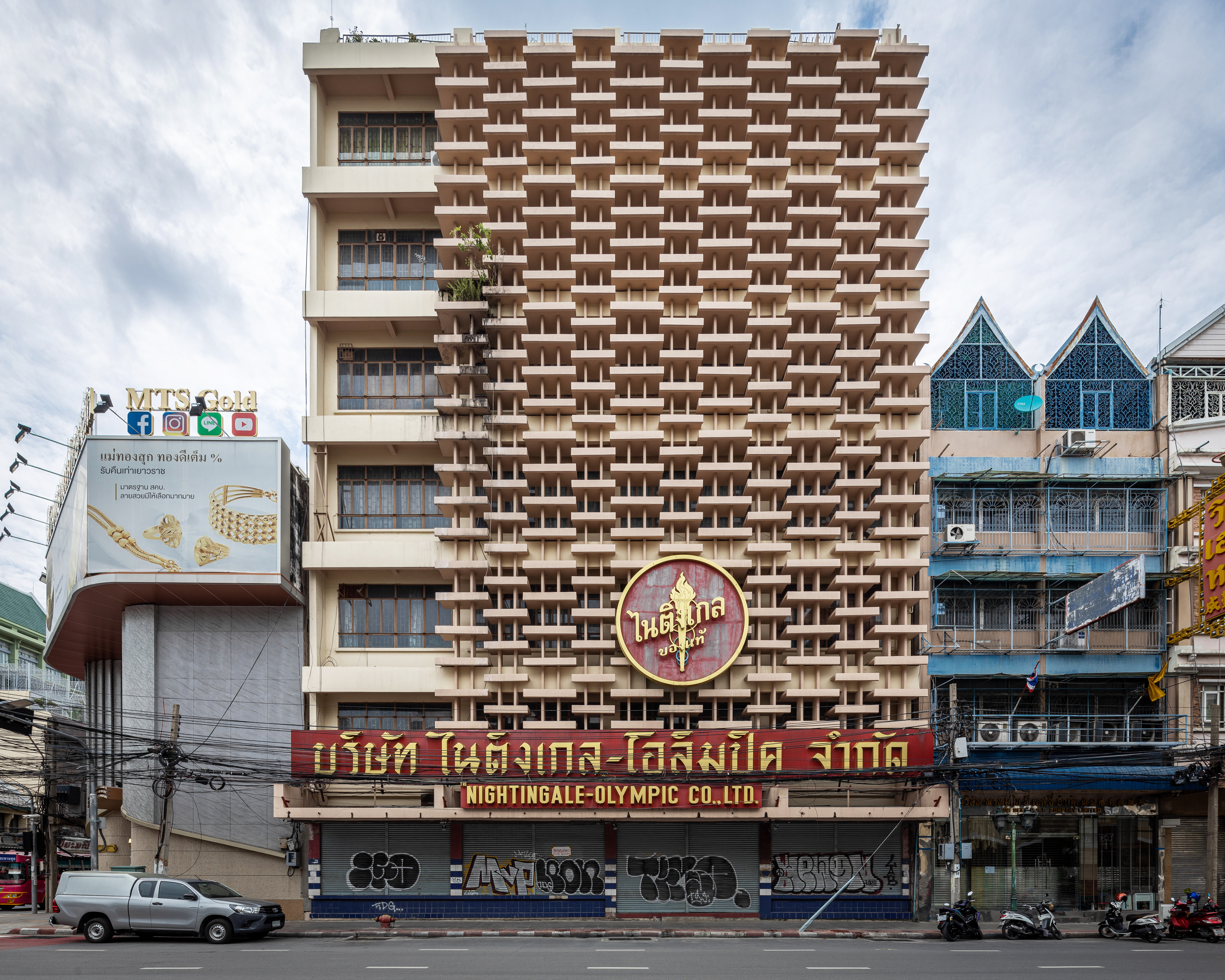
- Nightingale-Olympic in 2024
- Location: Phra Nakhon, Bangkok, Thailand
- Coordinates: 13.7454714°N 100.4992175°E
- Address: 70 Tri Phet Rd, Wang Burapha Phirom
- Opened: 5 August 1966 (officially)
- Closed: Mid-2024
- Developer: Nightingale Olympic Co., Ltd.
- Owner: Nightingale Olympic Co., Ltd.
- Floors: 7 (2 open to the public)
- Website: nightingaleolympic.com

Nightingale–Olympic, or The Nightingale–Olympic Co., LTD. (Thai: ไนติงเกล-โอลิมปิก), simply known as Nightingale, was a department store in Bangkok, Thailand. Located on Tri Phet Road in Bangkok's Wang Burapha Phirom subdistrict, it was the oldest department store in the nation until it closed, in 2024.

Nightingale was founded in 1930 as a single shophouse near Sala Chalermkrung Royal Theatre by Nat Niyomvanich, a local Thai Chinese businessman. At the time, he employed his six siblings as well as three nieces. In 1966, it was renamed Nightingale–Olympic.

In the 1960s, Nightingale was popular with teenagers. It sold cosmetics, stationery, fashionable clothing, lingerie, musical instruments, sports goods, and also included a beauty salon as well as Thailand's first fitness club. It used the slogan "Hub of sporting goods, king of musical instruments, queen of cosmetics".

In 2024, upon the death of Niyomvanich's younger sister Aroon, who had been running the store for decades, the business was closed.

== See also ==
- List of shopping malls in Bangkok
