= The Old Siam Plaza =

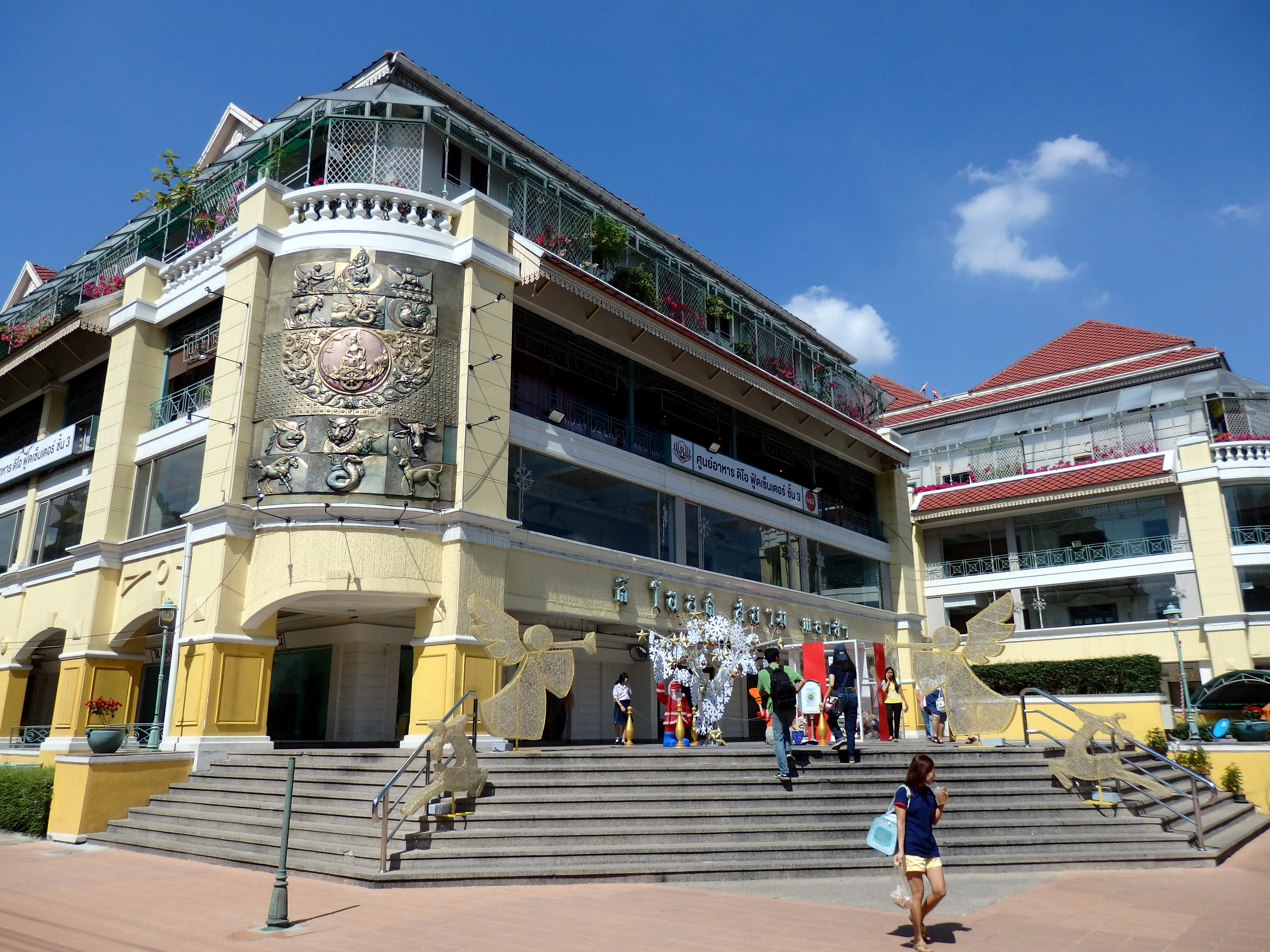
- The Old Siam Plaza in late 2015
- Location: Phra Nakhon, Bangkok, Thailand
- Coordinates: 13.745987°N 100.500209°E
- Address: 12 Tri Phet Road, Wang Burapha Phirom
- Opened: April 30, 1993
- Developer: Siam Sindhorn (in Crown Property Bureau network)
- Manager: Kajohnsak Somprasertsook
- Owner: Siam Sindhorn
- Num. of stores: 700 (in 1993)
- Floor area: 300 units
- Floors: 4
- Website: http://theoldsiam.co.th

The Old Siam Plaza (Thai: ดิโอลด์สยามพลาซ่า) is a shopping mall in Wang Burapha, a historic neighbourhood of Bangkok, Thailand. It is surrounded by Tri Phet, Burapha, Phahurat and Charoen Krung roads, and is near other neighbourhoods such as Yaowarat, Pak Khlong Talat or Ban Mo. It is a four-story air-conditioned building. The building characterized by a blend of colonial and Sino-Portuguese architecture, which was popular during the reign of King Chulalongkorn (late 19th century to early 20th century).

== History & facilities ==
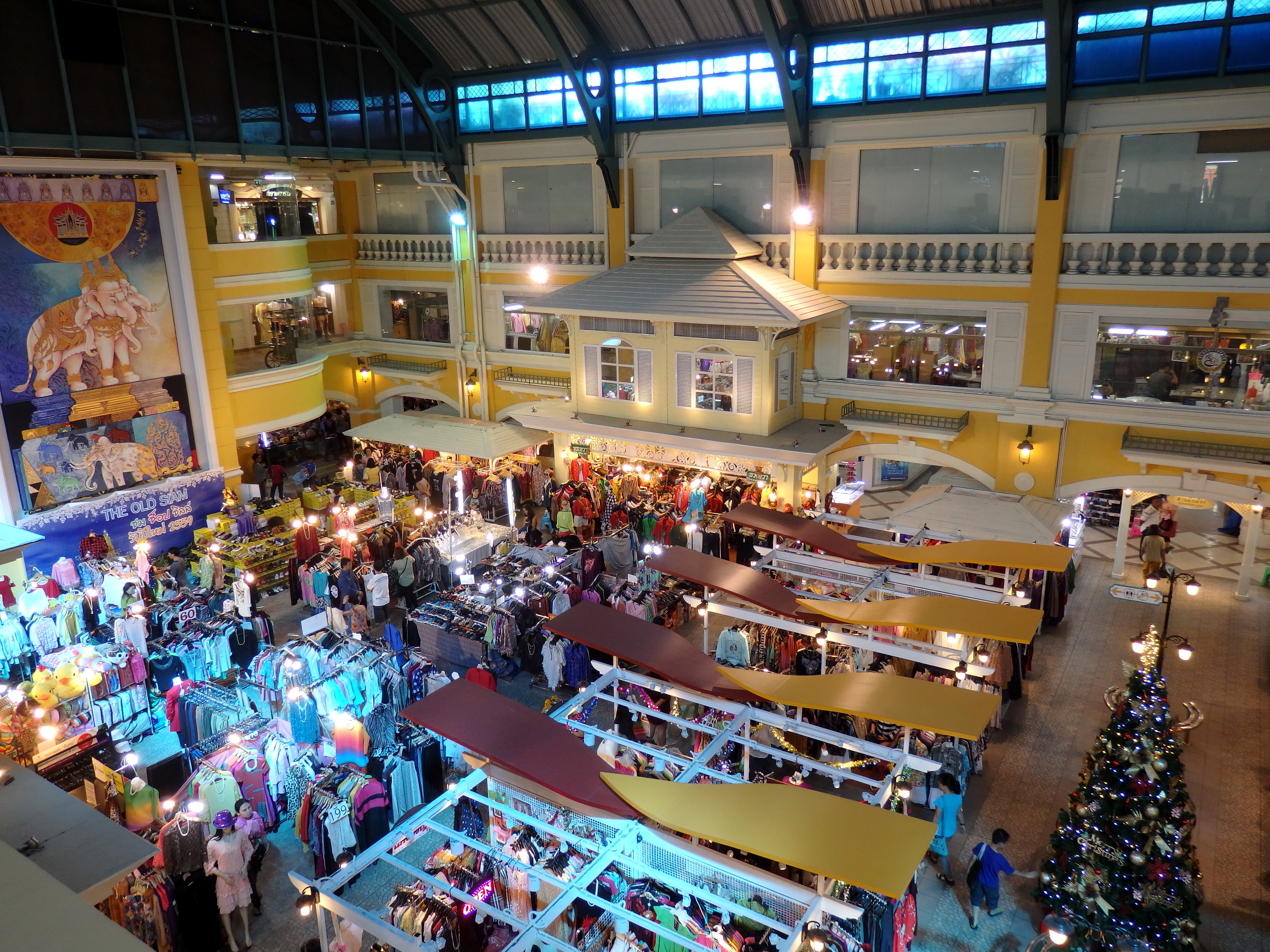
Lan Ming Mueang

The mall is on the site of the former Ming Mueang market, part of notable Wang Burapha commercial and entertainment district. In the first decades of the 20th century, Ming Mueang market flourished with the shops dedicated to tailoring. In this way, many buyers who purchased fabrics in Phahurat later went in search of the seamstresses of Ming Mueang to make dresses for them. The market was demolished in the late 1970s along with the stagnation of Wang Burapha. The seamstresses moved to Phahurat and opened their own tailor shops.

In 1993, the Old Siam Plaza was opened where the Ming Mueang market was previously located. It was originally intended as the epicenter of jewelry sales in Bangkok, but it eventually became a market that offers clothing, second-hand clothes, electronics, crafts and fast food, in addition to having a few jewelers. Presently, to remember the past that was once prosperous, an event space on the first floor of the mall was called Lan Ming Mueang (ลานมิ่งเมือง, "Ming Mueang Plaza"), which features vendors selling traditional Thai desserts and Thai cuisine. In addition, there are Charoen Krung Zone (โซนเจริญกรุง) and Lan Fueang Nakhon (ลานเฟื่องนคร, "Fueang Nakhon Plaza"), all named after historic roads on Rattanakosin Island. These areas serve as retail spaces specializing in traditional Thai clothing and accessories.

After operating for 30 years, in 2023 The Old Siam Plaza undertook a major renovation costing 400 million baht to become the first mixed-use lifestyle on Rattanakosin Island. The fourth floor has been renovated from a former food court into Bamrung Mueang Market, (ตลาดบำรุงเมือง) and further developed into a residential area with a total of 128 units.

== See also ==
- List of shopping malls in Bangkok
