= Siam Electricity Company =

Former power company in Thailand

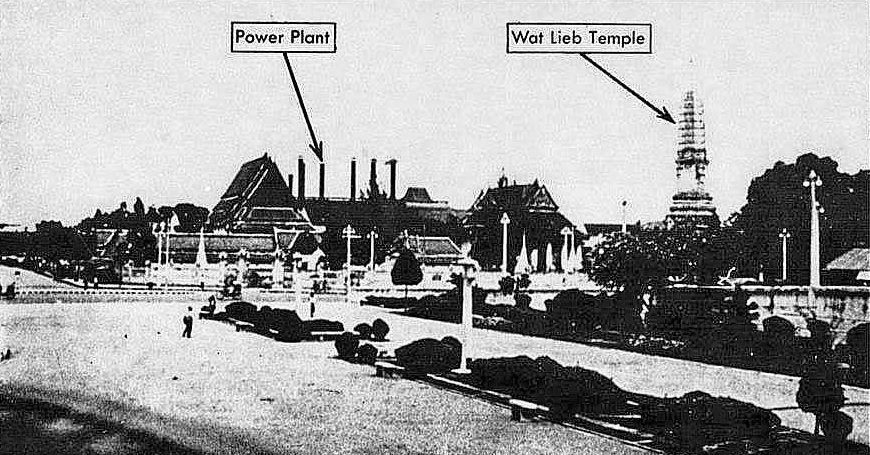
- The power plant, seen behind Wat Ratchaburana in a USAAF World War II file
- Native name: บริษัทไฟฟ้าสยาม จำกัด
- Industry: Electric utility
- Founded: 1898; 128 years ago
- Defunct: 1950; 76 years ago
- Fate: Nationalized and later merged into Metropolitan Electricity Authority
- Headquarters: Thailand
- Area served: Bangkok

The Siam Electricity Company Limited (Note: Thai: บริษัทไฟฟ้าสยาม จำกัด, RTGS: Borisat Faifa [Siam] Chamkat) was the first power company in Thailand. It provided electricity for Bangkok from its Wat Liap Power Plant (Note: โรงไฟฟ้าวัดเลียบ, RTGS: Rong Faifa Wat Liap) throughout the first half of the twentieth century, and also was a major operator of the city's tram system.

The company's first inception was in 1889, but it struggled and went bankrupt within a few years. In 1898, a Danish company of the same name was granted a concession for its operations, and the business prospered under the new company. The availability of electricity was expanded throughout the city, as were tram services. The plant was heavily damaged by Allied bombing towards the end of World War II, but was repaired and continued to operate for almost two more decades. The company, which had been renamed Thai Electric Corporation Limited (Note: บริษัทไฟฟ้าไทย คอร์ปอเรชั่น จำกัด, RTGS: Borisat Faifa Thai [Corporation] Chamkat) in 1939, operated until 1950, when its concession ended and its operations were nationalized as Bangkok Electric Works. (Note: การไฟฟ้ากรุงเทพฯ, RTGS: Kan Faifa Krungthep; also translated as the Bangkok Electricity Authority) The state enterprise in turn became merged into the Metropolitan Electricity Authority in 1958. The company's original building is being restored and converted into a museum.

== History ==
=== Inception ===
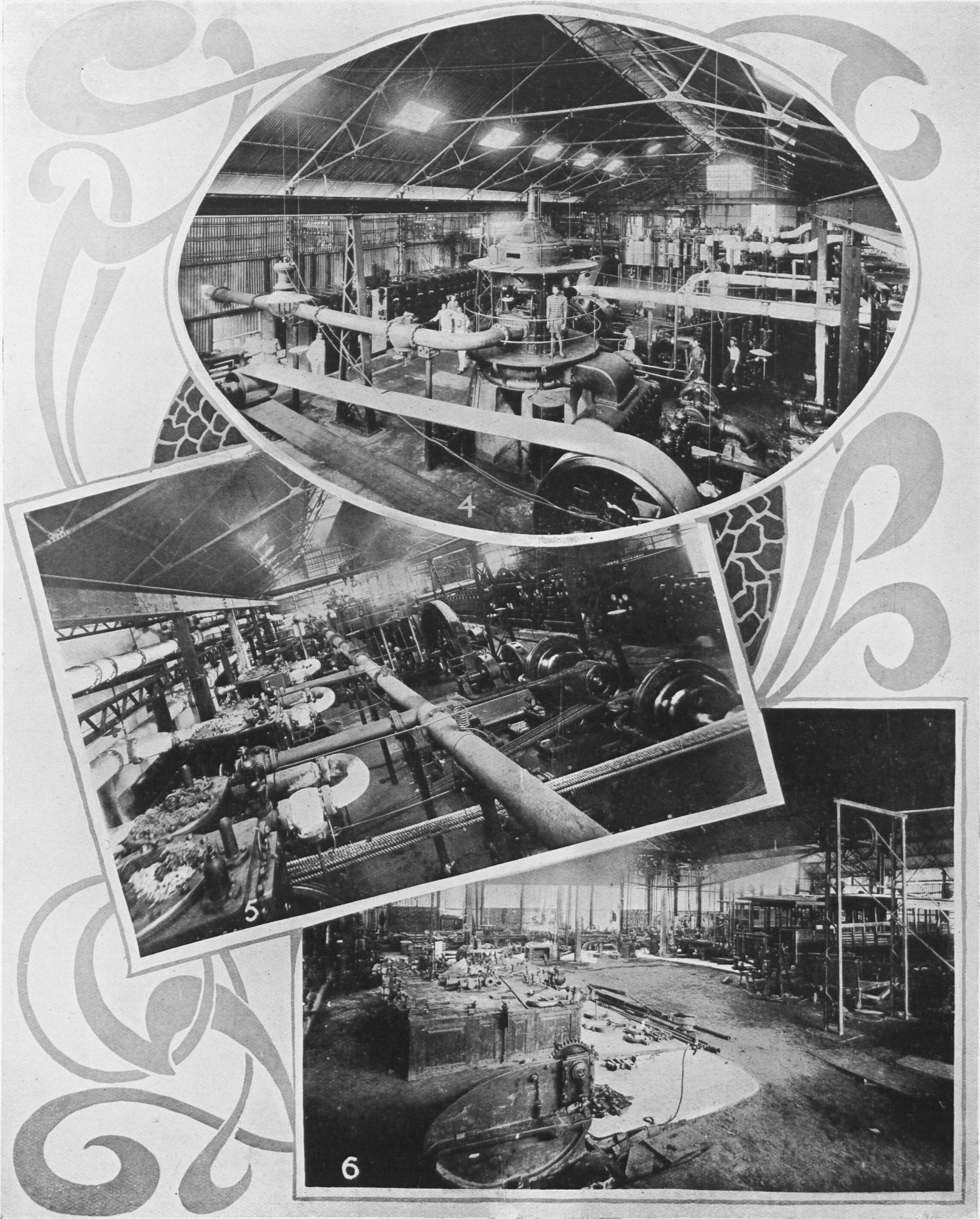
The power station (4 & 5) and workshop (6) at the Siam Electricity Company, from the 1908 book Twentieth Century Impressions of Siam

The Siam Electricity Company was first founded in 1889 by a group of royals and nobles, headed by Prince Thongthaem Thavalyawongse, who made a request to King Chulalongkorn (Rama V) for a thirty-year monopoly on what would be the country's first electric power station. (Note: Electricity had previously been set up and demonstrated on a smaller scale in the Grand Palace.) Siam Electricity was established as a private company; though the majority of its shares were held by the Crown, its operations were independent of the royal government of Siam, as Thailand was then known. Its generating station was located on the grounds of Wat Ratchaburana, which was also known as Wat Liap, leading the factory to also become known as Wat Liap Power Plant. Electricity was generated by steam engine, mainly using rice husks from the numerous nearby mills for fuel, and distributed along several streets in the city: Tri Phet, Ban Mo, Sanam Chai and Bamrung Mueang going north, and Charoen Krung, Yaowarat and Sampheng to the southeast. The power was used solely for lighting, mainly of the streets, royal residences and government offices, plus handful of nobles' and foreigners' residences, meaning that most of the revenue came from the royal government.

The initial operations met with many obstacles, including unreliability, ballooning costs due to reliance on hired Western engineers, fuel shortages, and theft of electric cables. The company went bankrupt in 1892, after three years of operation, and the royal government took over its operations, albeit rather unwillingly as it continued to operate at a loss. In 1897, the government granted an extendable ten-year concession for the business to American L.E. Bennet, who sold the rights to a Danish group, headed by Andreas du Plessis de Richelieu, the following year.

=== Danish operation ===
The Danes incorporated a new company in Copenhagen, also known as Siam Electricity Company (and alternatively as the Electricity Company Limited), and revived the business and had the concession term extended to 1950. Under the management of Aage Westenholz, electrification was extended north to Dusit Palace and southeast to the Chinese and Western business districts (now Chinatown and Bang Rak), where private businesses quickly adopted its use. The company provided electricity for Bangkok's first tram line, which had been electrified in 1893, and acquired the line in 1900. By 1908, it operated half the city's tram lines, and also provided the city with street-watering and firefighting services.

The company was very successful, and its capital expanded sevenfold within ten years of operation. The company was sold to a Belgian group in 1913, and was joined in the market by the government-owned Sam Sen Power Plant in 1914. Siam Electricity became responsible for providing electricity south of Bang Lamphu Canal in the east side of the city, and south of Khlong Bangkok Noi in the Thonburi side.

=== Later days ===
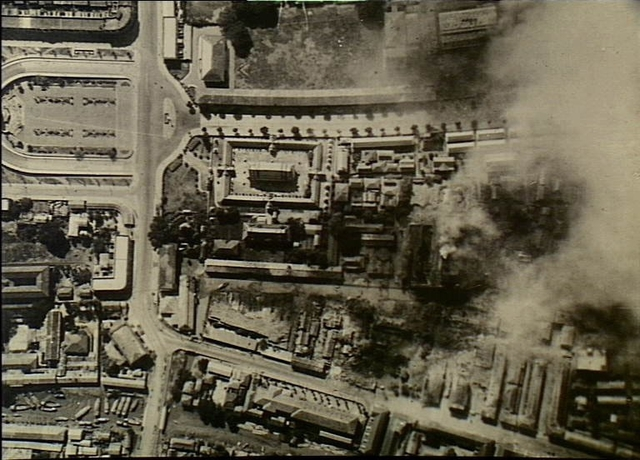
The power station was bombed by RAF Liberator aircraft on 14 April 1945.

When Siam changed its name to Thailand in 1939, so was the company renamed to Thai Electric Corporation Limited. During World War II, when Thailand allied with Japan, Bangkok was subject to Allied bombing raids, and the two power plants were bombed and disabled in April 1945, leaving the city in darkness. Wat Liap Power Plant was brought back online after two months, and continued to operate under the company until the end of 1949, when its concession expired. The operations were taken over by Bangkok Electric Works, which was set up as a state enterprise in 1950.

Electricity demand in Bangkok as well as throughout the country surged during the post-war period, prompting the government to redevelop the country's energy infrastructure. Bangkok Electric Works was merged with the Public Works Department's Electrical Division (the operator of Sam Sen Power Plant) to become the Metropolitan Electricity Authority (MEA) in 1958. Wat Liap Power Plant ceased operations soon afterward, as it was superseded by larger power stations elsewhere.

The original building of Wat Liap Power Plant still stands as part of the MEA's Wat Liab District office, and is listed as an unregistered ancient monument by the Fine Arts Department. In 2020, the MEA announced plans to restore the building for use as a museum.
