= Metropolitan Electricity Authority =

Thai state enterprise

Metropolitan Electricity Authority (MEA)
- Logo depicts the Ananta Samakhom Throne Hall surrounded by electric bolts.

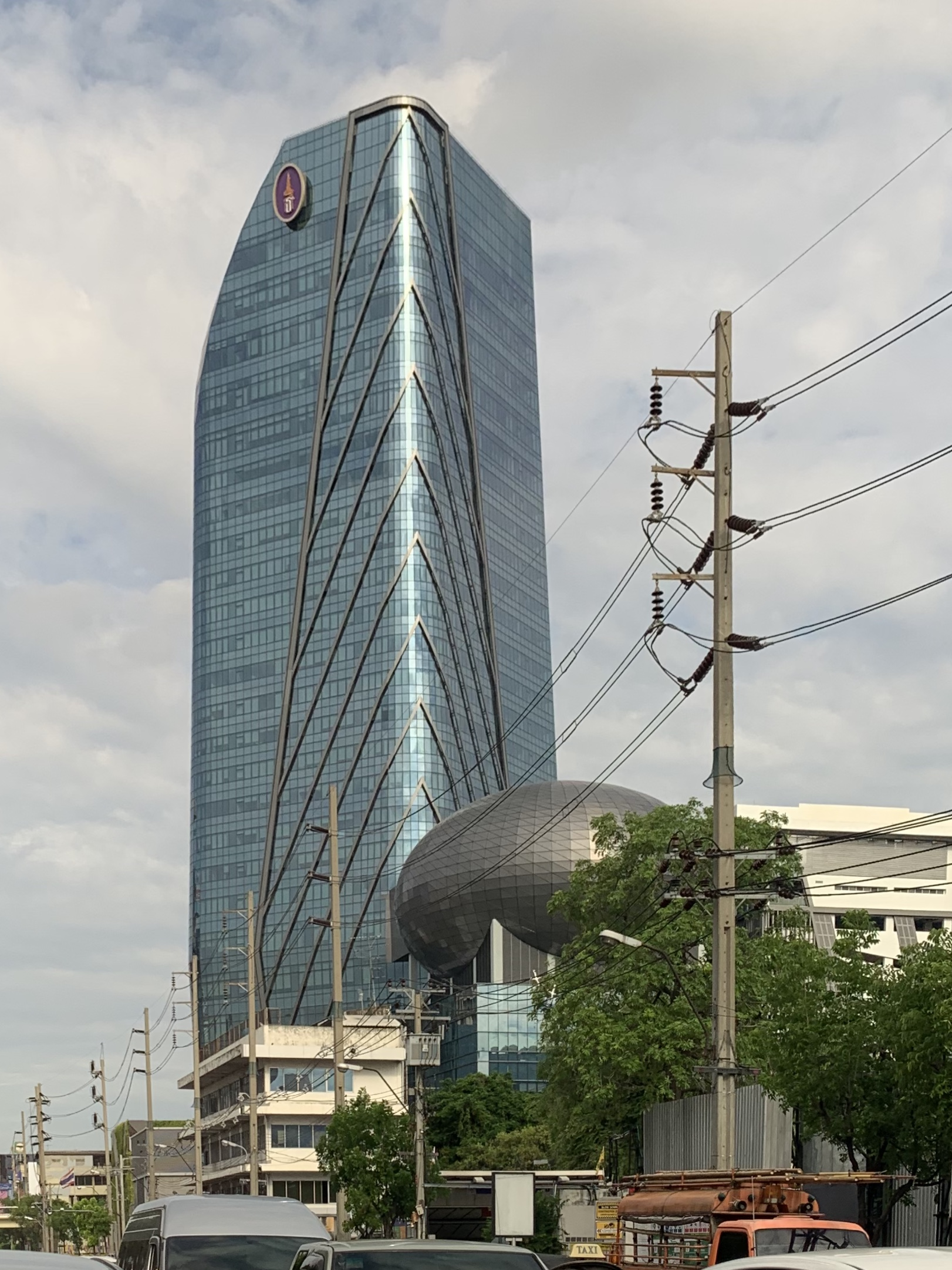
- MEA Headquarters in 2019
- Native name: การไฟฟ้านครหลวง
- Romanized name: kan fai fa nakhon luang
- Company type: State enterprise
- Industry: Municipal electricity supply
- Predecessors: Bangkok Electricity Authority; Royal Samsen Electricity Division
- Founded: 1 August 1958; 67 years ago in Bangkok, Thailand
- Headquarters: Bangkok, Thailand
- Area served: Bangkok Metropolitan Area
- Key people: Wiras Chaloeysat (Governor)
- Revenue: 200,603 million baht (2014)
- Net income: 11,177 million baht (2014)
- Total assets: 177,541 million baht (2014)
- Number of employees: 8,338 (2014)
- Parent: Ministry of Interior
- Website: Official website

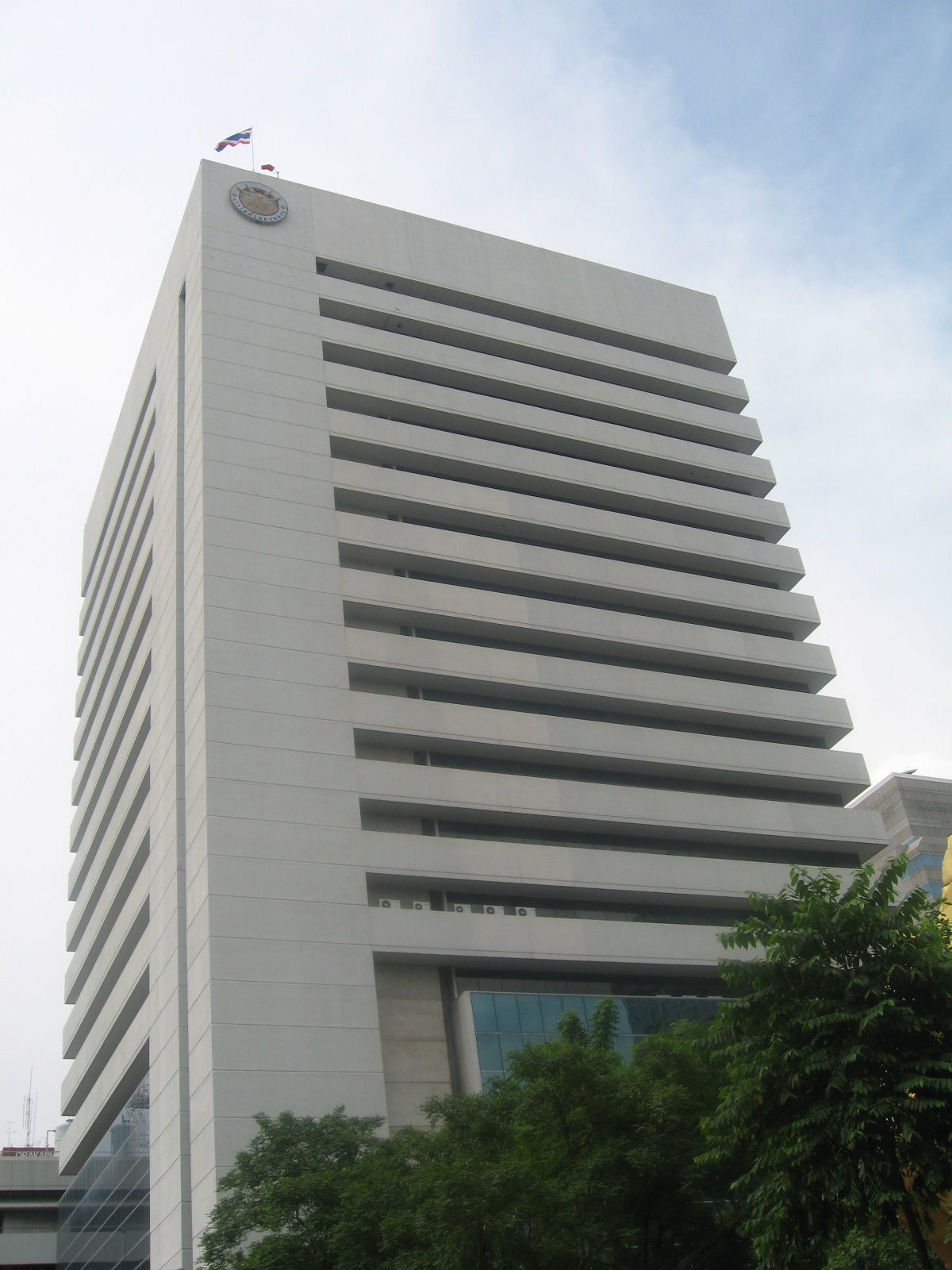
Old Headquarters

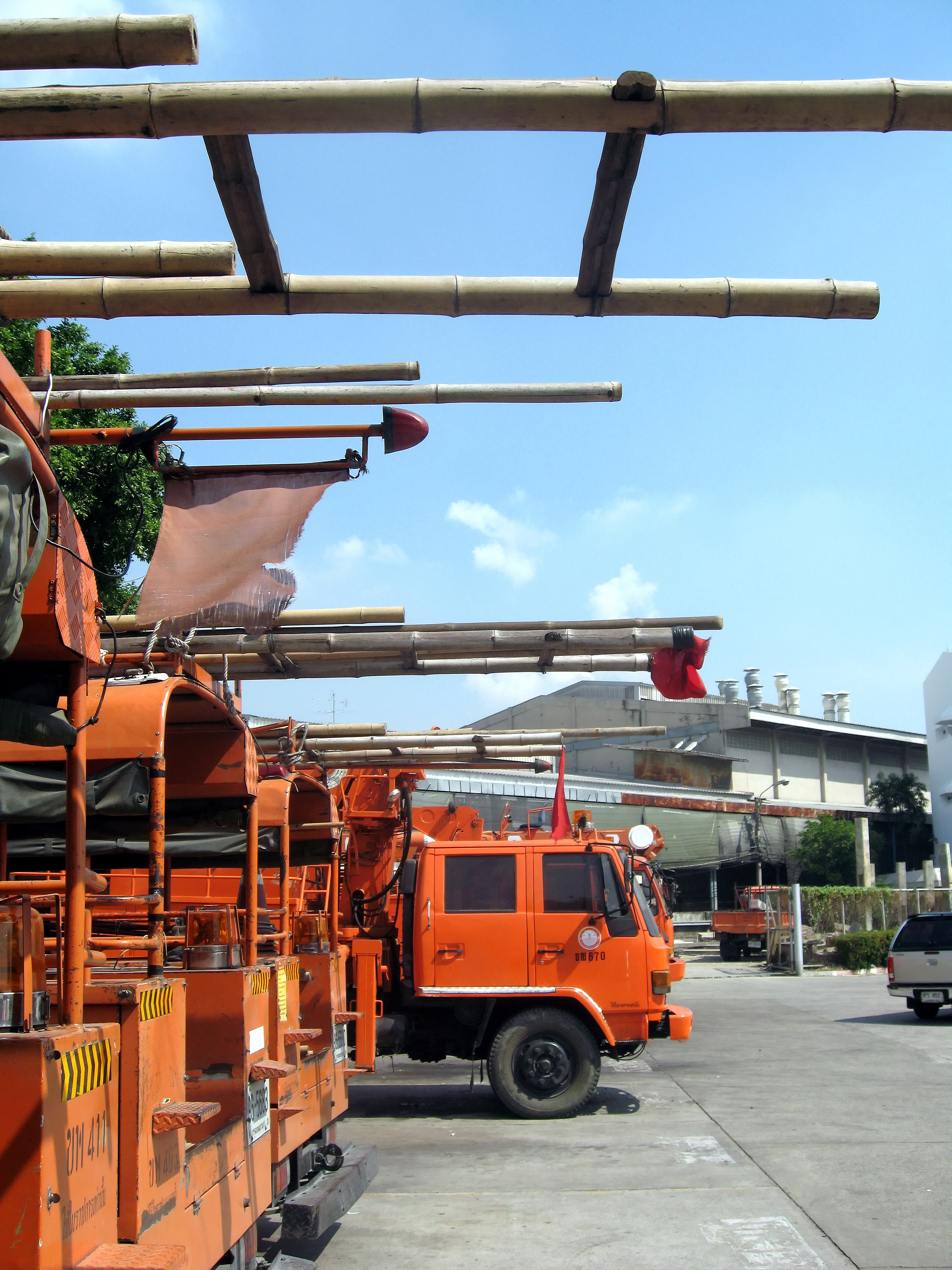
Metropolitan Electricity Authority in Bang Phli, Samut Prakan Province

The Metropolitan Electricity Authority (MEA) (Thai: การไฟฟ้านครหลวง) is a Thai state enterprise under the Ministry of Interior. It was established on 1 August 1958 by the Metropolitan Electricity Authority Act 1958 (BE 2501). Its governor is Mr Somchai Roadrungwasinkul.

== History ==
The first recorded use of electricity in Thailand was the lighting of the Chakri Maha Prasat Hall of the Grand Palace on the occasion of the birthday of King Chulalongkorn on 20 September 1884. The king took a great interest in electricity, particularly its potential for street lighting. In 1897, Luang Pinitjakrapan and Leo Nadee established the Bangkok Electric Light Syndicate to generate and distribute electricity to the citizens of Bangkok. It was later sold as concession to Siam Electricity Co. Ltd., a Danish company led by Aage Westenholz which at the time also operated the trams. Its main power plant was located at Wat Liap near the Memorial Bridge and thus Wat Liap Power Plant became Thailand's first power plant.

A succession of power companies with concomitant name changes followed. Siam Electricity Company Limited was one such early power company. In 1939 its name was changed to Thailand Electricity Corporation Company Limited. In 1950 its concession expired and it was taken over by the government, renaming it Bangkok Electricity Authority, operating under the aegis of the Interior Ministry.

On 1 August 1958 the Metropolitan Electricity Authority (MEA) was established by merging the Bangkok Electric Works and the Electrical Division of the Public Works Department to be responsible for providing power supply in Bangkok, Nonthaburi, and Samut Prakan. For electricity provision in Thailand's other 74 provinces, it is supplied by the Provincial Electricity Authority.

== Operations ==
MEA maintains 18 district offices and 12 branch offices in its service area.

Maximum demand for power peaked at 8,669 MW in 2014.

== Financials ==
In FY2014 (1 October 2013 – 30 September 2014) MEA reported a net profit of 11,252 million baht on revenues of 200,603 million baht. Its energy sales for the year amounted to 47,856 GWh to 3,395,367 customers. Its total assets were 177,541 million baht. Employees numbered 8,338.

== See also ==
- Metropolitan Waterworks Authority
- Provincial Electricity Authority
- Ministry of Interior (Thailand)
