= Phahurat =

Neighborhood in Bangkok, Thailand

Coordinates: 13°44′41″N 100°30′02″E

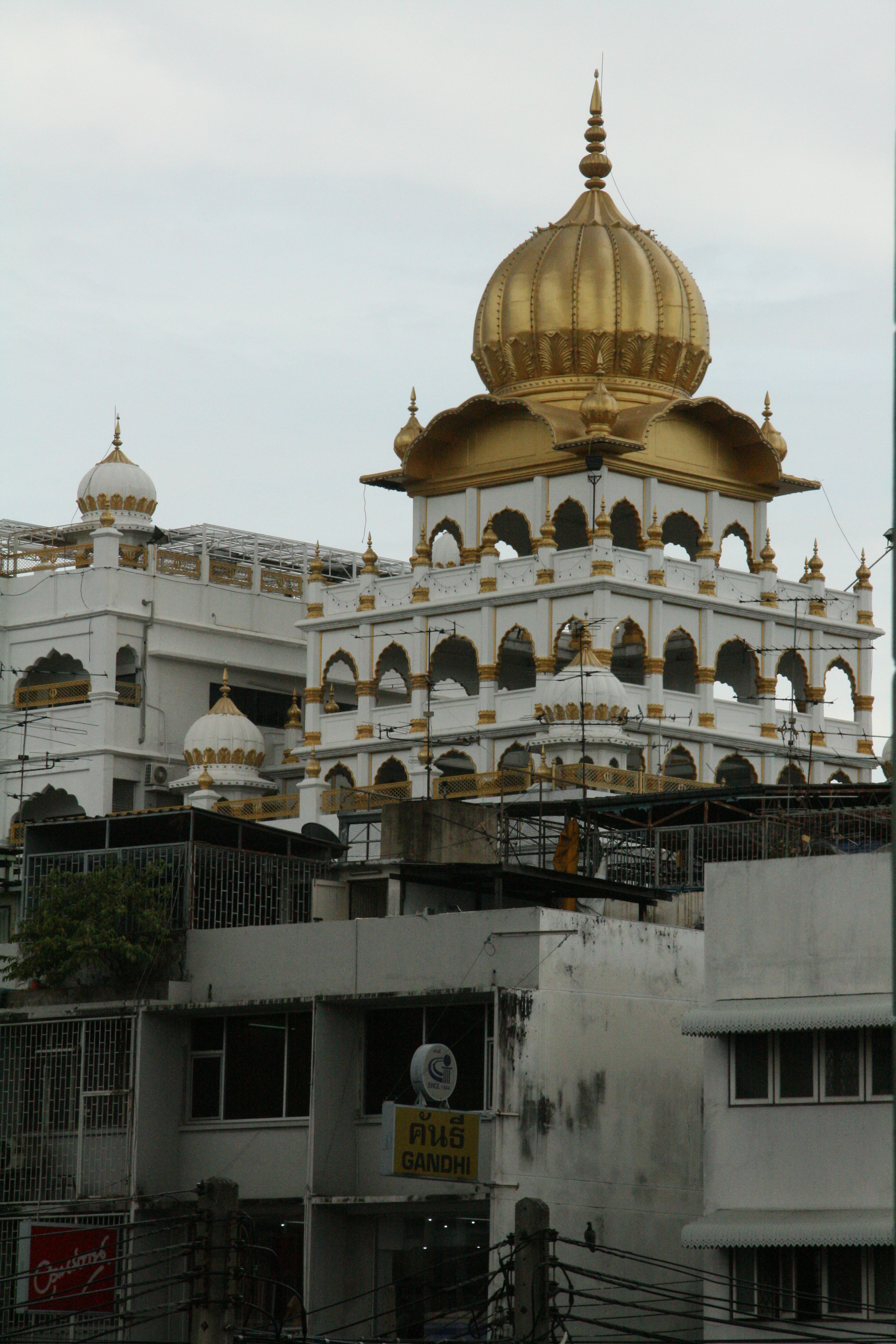
Dome of Gurudwara Siri Guru Singh Sabha seen behind shophouses. The Sikh temple is a landmark of Phahurat neighborhood.

Phahurat or Pahurat (Thai: พาหุรัด, pronounced [pʰaː˧.hu˨˩.rat̚˦], lit. "gold upper arm bracelet"), sometimes described as Thailand's Little India, is an ethnic neighborhood surrounding Phahurat Road in Wang Burapha Phirom Subdistrict, Phra Nakhon District, Bangkok.

In terms of the road layout, Phahurat is a short street divided into two sections. The first section extends from Ban Mo Road at Ban Mo Intersection and ends at Phahurat Intersection, where it meets Tri Phet Road. The second section branches off from the west side of Chak Phet Road in the Saphan Han area and also terminates at Phahurat Intersection. Both sections are one-way streets. The second segment is known for its South Asian community and textile market, which also extends into the nearby Chak Phet and Tri Phet Roads. In contrast, the first segment is lined with jewelry and gold shops, as well as audio equipment stores, similar to those found in the Ban Mo area. The opening of the Phra Pok Klao Bridge in 1984, running parallel to the Memorial Bridge, provided more direct access to Phahurat. This development made the neighborhood more vibrant and easier to reach.

The sprawling of Chinese shops from the nearby Chinatown are slowly encroaching on Phahurat, but South Asian restaurants and businesses still dominate the area. It is home to some of Bangkok's more unusual shopping sites, including the sprawling Sampheng Market (Saphan Han), The Old Siam Plaza, and Nightingale–Olympic, with the four-storey India Emporium.

== History ==
The area that later became Phahurat was originally associated with an Annamese (Vietnamese) settlement during the Thonburi period. Vietnamese immigrants were given land to settle in the area, which was historically known as Baan Yuan, meaning “Vietnamese village.”In 1898, a major fire destroyed the settlement, leaving a large area of vacant land.During the reign of King Chulalongkorn, a new road was constructed through the area and was named Phahurat in memory of Princess Bahurada Manimaya, the king’s daughter.

During the late nineteenth and early twentieth centuries, Bangkok’s commercial districts expanded and South Asian merchants began establishing businesses in the Phahurat area. The neighborhood became particularly associated with Punjabi and Sikh communities, whose members became involved in textile trading and other commercial activities. As the community grew, shops selling fabrics, clothing, and related products expanded around Phahurat Road and nearby streets. The area gradually developed from an immigrant settlement into an important commercial district and became closely identified with Bangkok’s Indian community.

== Economy ==
Phahurat serves as one of Bangkok's primary wholesale and retail commercial districts, widely recognized as the traditional center of Thailand's textile and garment trade.

The economic activity in Phahurat centers around several specialized markets and commercial landmarks:

- Textile and Garment Wholesale: The core of Phahurat's economy is the trade of raw fabrics, traditional Thai and Indian attire (such as sarees and kurtas), ribbons, buttons, and sewing supplies.
- Phahurat Market: A dense network of narrow alleyways lined with small stalls and shops offering affordable textiles, haberdashery, and custom tailoring services.
- India Emporium: A multi-story air-conditioned shopping center located at the main intersection, specializing in wholesale fabrics, traditional clothing, and imported goods from South Asia.
- The Old Siam Plaza: Located at the edge of the neighborhood, this shopping plaza houses traditional Thai silk merchants, traditional Thai dessert shops, and wedding apparel stores.
- South Asian Commerce and Culinary Trade: In addition to textiles, the neighborhood supports a vibrant ecosystem of Indian restaurants, sweet shops (selling desserts like gulab jamun and jalebi), religious items, incense, and cosmetics.

== Transportation ==
Phahurat is located in a densely populated historical commercial area of Bangkok and is accessible by several public transport.

=== Rapid transit ===
MRT (blue-line): The neighborhood is served by Sam Yot MRT station, located approximately 300 meters north of Phahurat Road. The station provides direct access to the area via Exit 3 (Siri Phong Road / Unakan Intersection).

=== Water transport ===
Chao Phraya Express Boat: The area is accessible via the Chao Phraya River transport network:

- Memorial Bridge Pier (N6): Located at the western end of Phahurat Road near the Memorial Bridge (Phra Phutta Yodfa Bridge).
- Pier (N5): Located nearby in Chinatown (Yaowarat), within walking distance to the eastern section of Phahurat.

=== Bus ===
Phahurat Road and the surrounding streets (such as Chakphet Road and Tri Phet Road) are major bus routes serviced by the Bangkok Mass Transit Authority (BMTA) and private operators. Key bus lines passing through or terminating near Phahurat include:

- Routes: 3, 6, 7, 8, 9, 21, 37, 42, 53, 73, and 82.

=== Road connectivity ===
Phahurat Road connects directly to several major arterial roads in the Rattanakosin Island and Phra Nakhon districts:

- Tri Phet Road – Connects to The Old Siam Plaza and the Memorial Bridge.
- Chakphet Road – Leads toward the Pak Khlong Talat (Flower Market).

== Landmarks ==
The main landmark in Phahurat is the Siri Guru Singh Sabha Gurdwara (วัดซิกข์ ศรีคุรุสิงห์สภา), the largest Sikh temple in Thailand. The Sikh community built the permanent gurdwara on Chak Phet Road, completing it in 1933. Its gilded dome is a landmark of the neighbourhood.

The area is best known for its cloth trade. Phahurat Market (ตลาดพาหุรัด) is a dense cluster of shops and alleys selling fabric, saris, silk and tailoring supplies. The district developed as a Sikh trading area during the reign of King Rama V. It remains one of Bangkok's main wholesale textile markets. The neighbourhood grew alongside nearby Chinatown, linking Indian textile traders with Chinese wholesalers. India Emporium (อินเดีย เอ็มโพเรี่ยม) is an air-conditioned shopping centre beside the gurdwara.

Other buildings in and around the area include:

- Nightingale-Olympic Department Store (ไนติงเกล-โอลิมปิค) on Tri Phet Road, founded in 1930. It was known by the slogan "hub of sporting goods, king of musical instruments, queen of cosmetics", and closed in 2024.
- The Old Siam Plaza (ดิโอลด์สยาม พลาซ่า) on Tri Phet Road, which opened in 1993 on the site of the former Ming Mueang market.
- Sampheng Market (ตลาดสำเพ็ง), the old Chinese wholesale market near Phahurat. Chinese residents were relocated there when King Rama I founded Bangkok in 1782.
- Pak Khlong Talat (ปากคลองตลาด), a flower and produce market on Chak Phet Road near Memorial Bridge, open 24 hours a day.
- Sala Chalermkrung Royal Theatre (ศาลาเฉลิมกรุง) on Charoen Krung Road, which opened in 1933 as Thailand's first air-conditioned theatre.

== Gallery ==
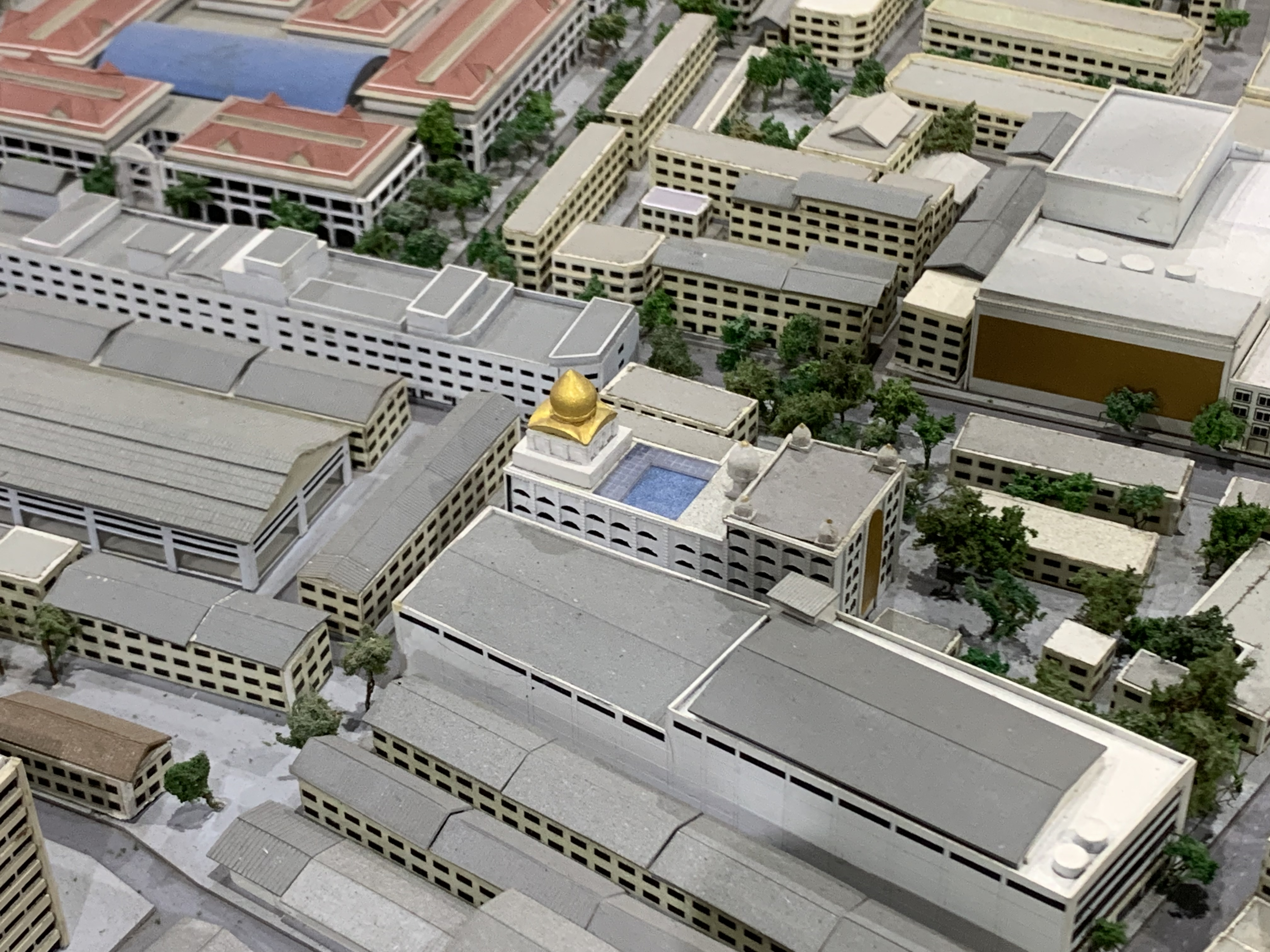
Phahurat in the scale model of Bangkok. The gold dome is of the gurdwara

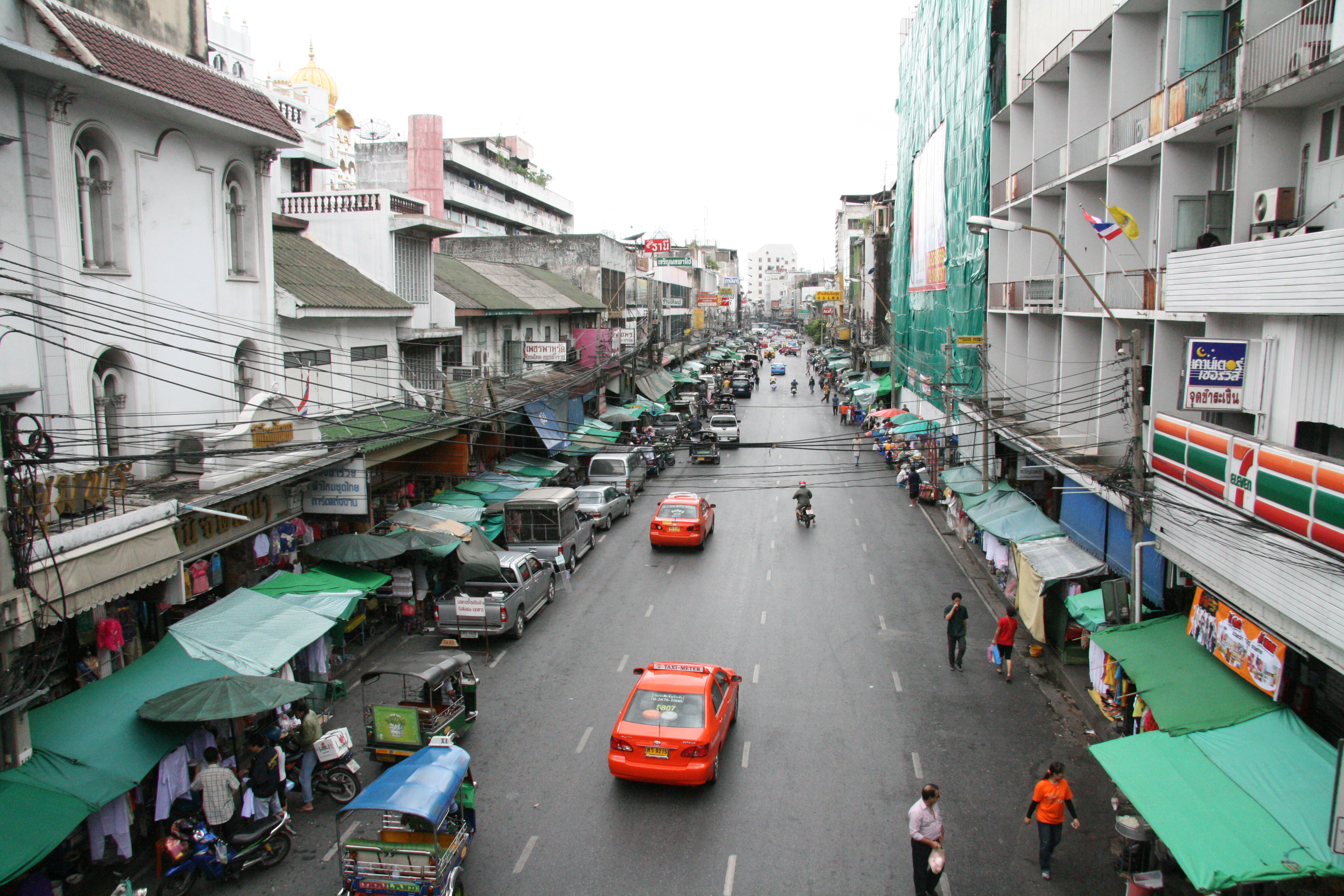
Phahurat Road (second section)

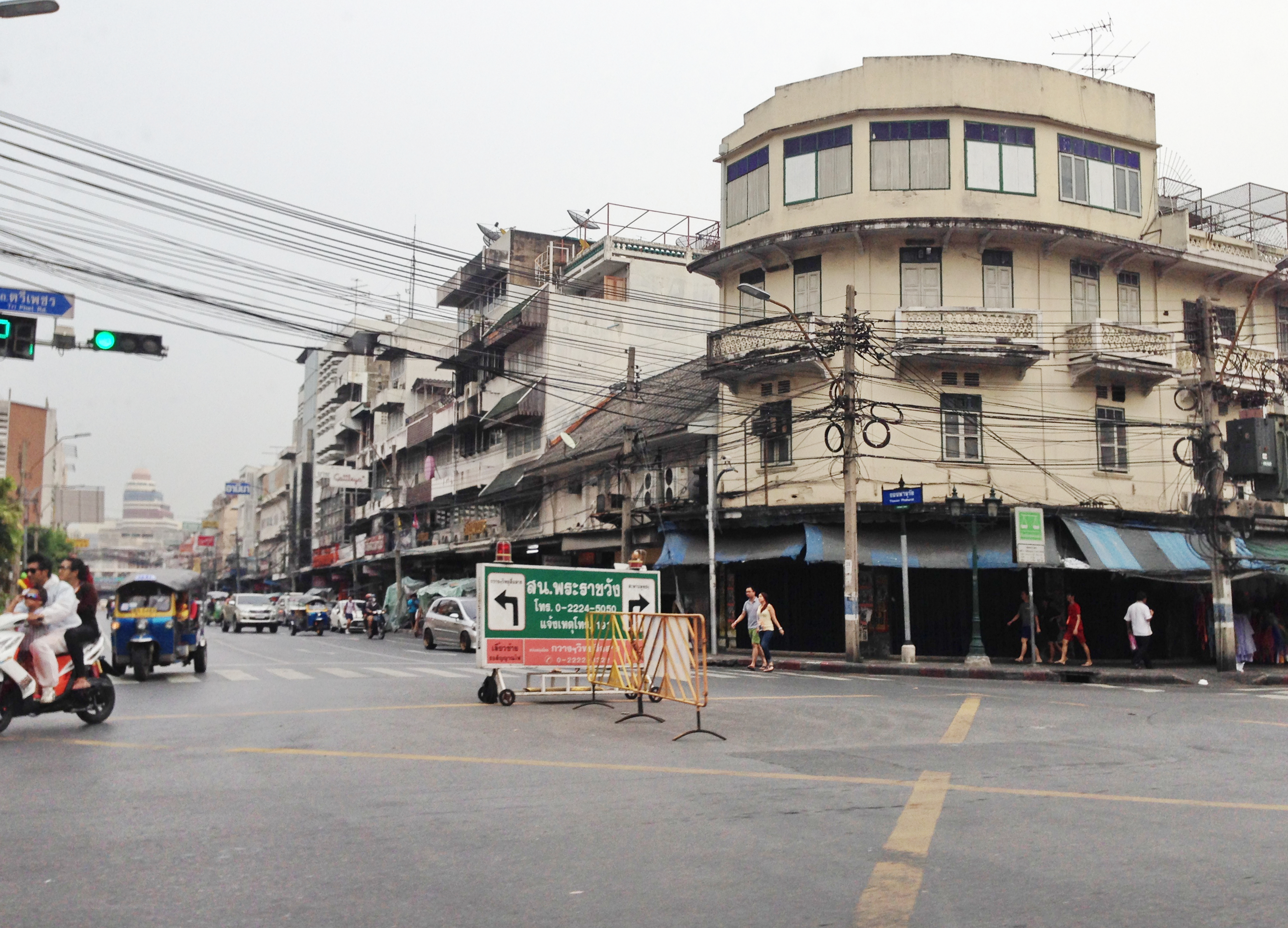
Phahurat Intersection (view toward second section)

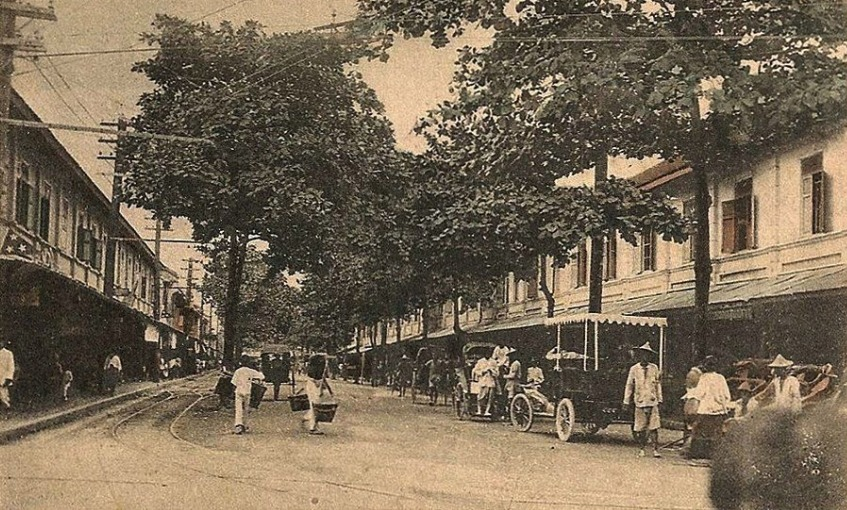
Phahurat in 1909

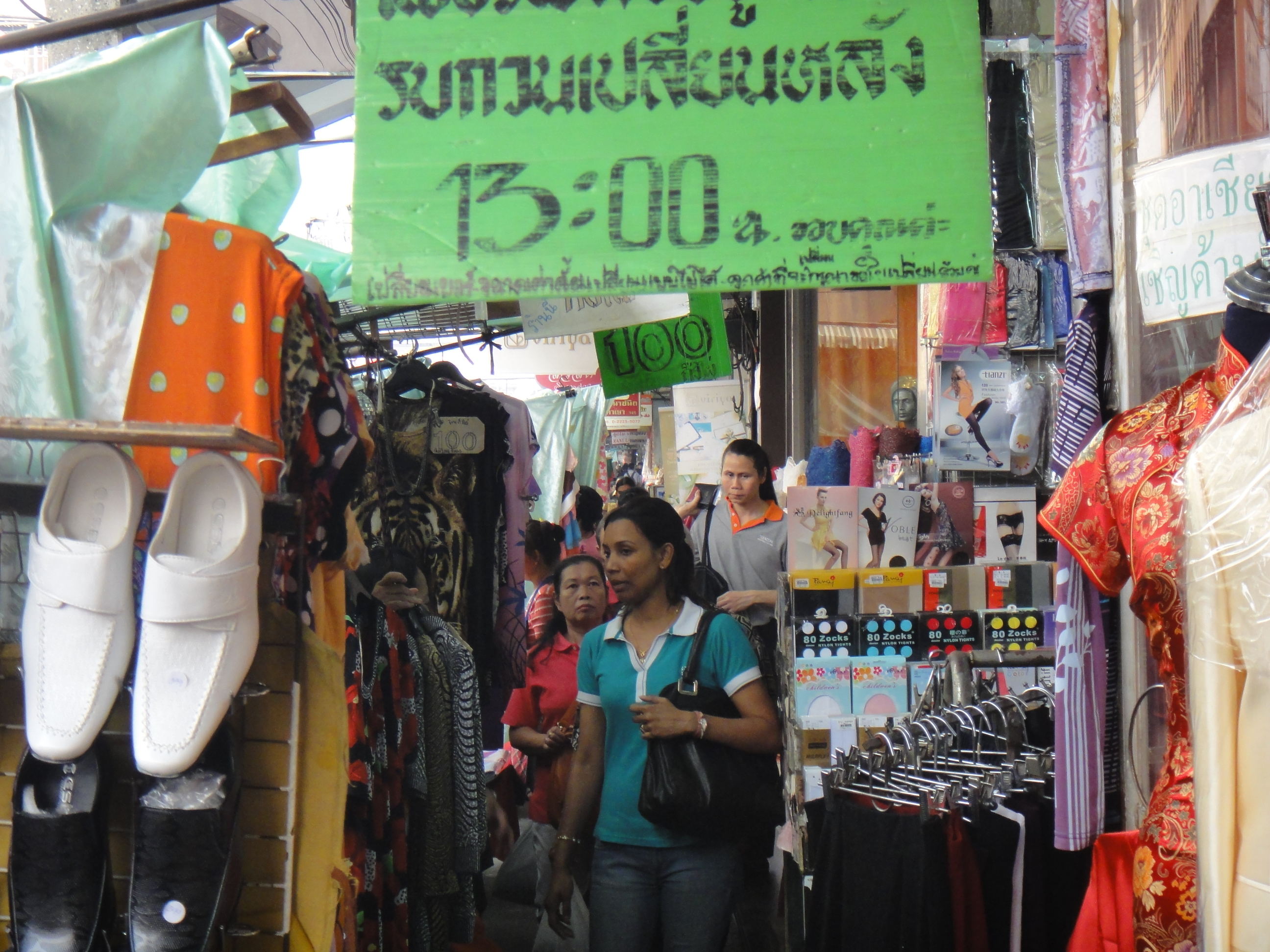
Atmosphere of clothing and textile stalls on Phahurat

== See also ==
- Sikhism in Thailand
