= Tri Phet Road =

Road in Bangkok, Thailand

Coordinates: 13°44′49.2″N 100°29′59.4″E

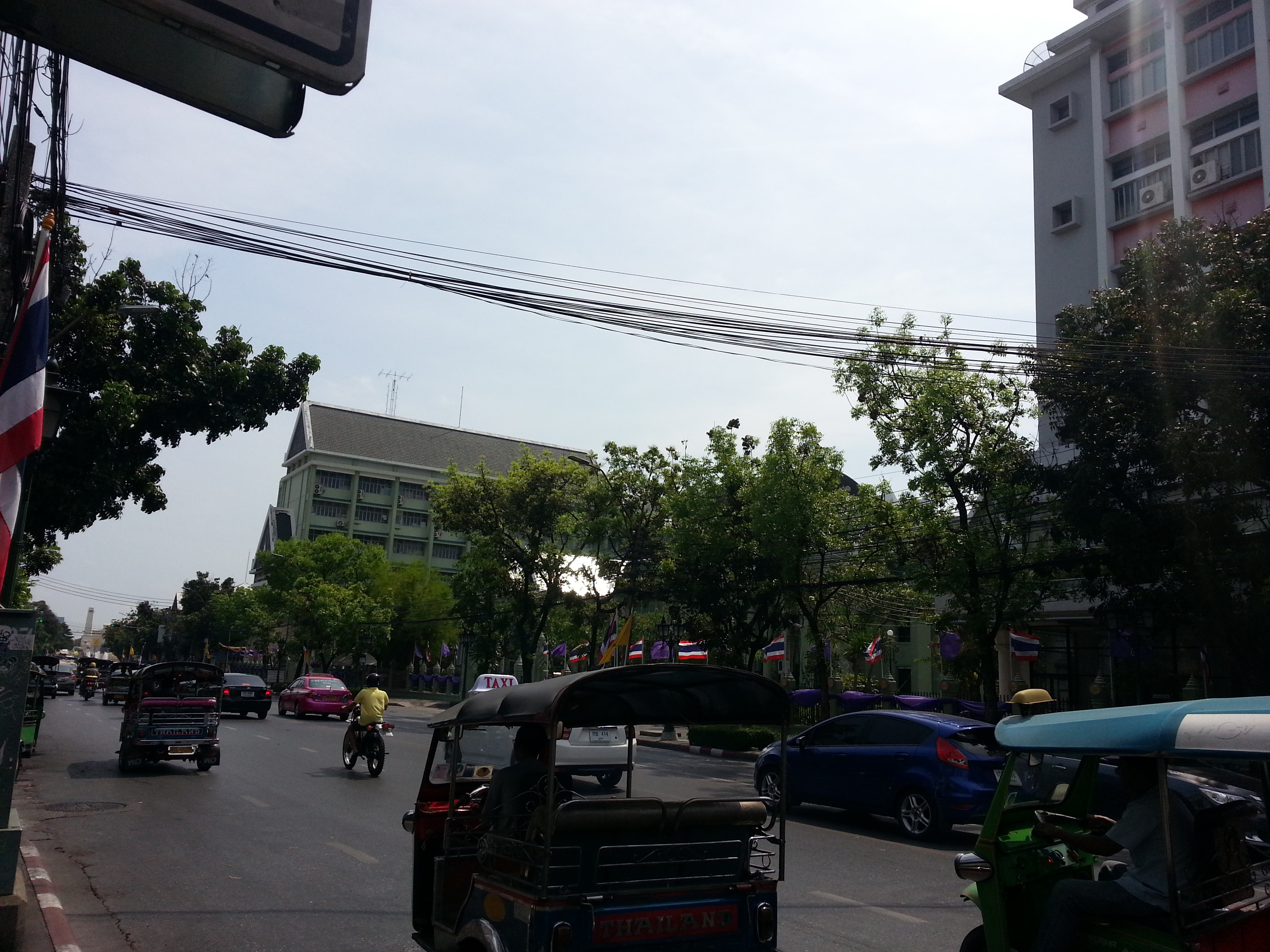
Tri Phet Road in front of Poh-Chang Academy of Arts (Rajamangala University of Technology Rattanakosin)

Tri Phet Road (Thai: ถนนตรีเพชร, RTGS: Thanon Tri Phet, pronounced [tʰā.nǒn trīː pʰét]) is a road in inner Bangkok, it is located in Wang Burapha Phirom Subdistrict, Phra Nakhon District, regarded as one of the memorials to the children of King Chulalongkorn (Rama V) who died as a child as same as Sirirat Hospital, or Uruphong Intersection etc.

Tri Phet Road starts at the Chaloem Krung Intersection in front of Sala Chalermkrung Royal Theatre, cuts across Ti Thong Road, run straight to the Phahurat Intersection and ends at the foot of Memorial Bridge.

It was built by royal command of King Chulalongkorn in memory of Prince Tribejrutama Dhamrong, his son born to Queen Saovabha Phongsri. The young prince died, at the age of seven in the year 1887. The construction was financed by the deceased prince's private fund.

Originally, it was just a length of Charoen Krung to Phahurat Roads. Later in the year 1898, King Chulalongkorn has given the extension to reach the future the foot of the Memorial Bridge, where Chak Phet Road runs through like today. The road has a total length of 650 m (2,132 ft).

In the 150th anniversary of Rattanakosin in the year 1932, King Prajadhipok (Rama VII) ordered the celebration of city and the construction of a Memorial Bridge including King Phutthayotfa Chulalok (Rama I) Statue that are directly on the end of the Tri Phet Road.

Although it is a short road, it runs through many important places, for example Nightingale–Olympic Department Store, The Old Siam Plaza, Wat Ratchaburana, and the Long Corridor of Suankularb Wittayalai School with Poh-Chang Academy of Arts etc.

== Gallery ==
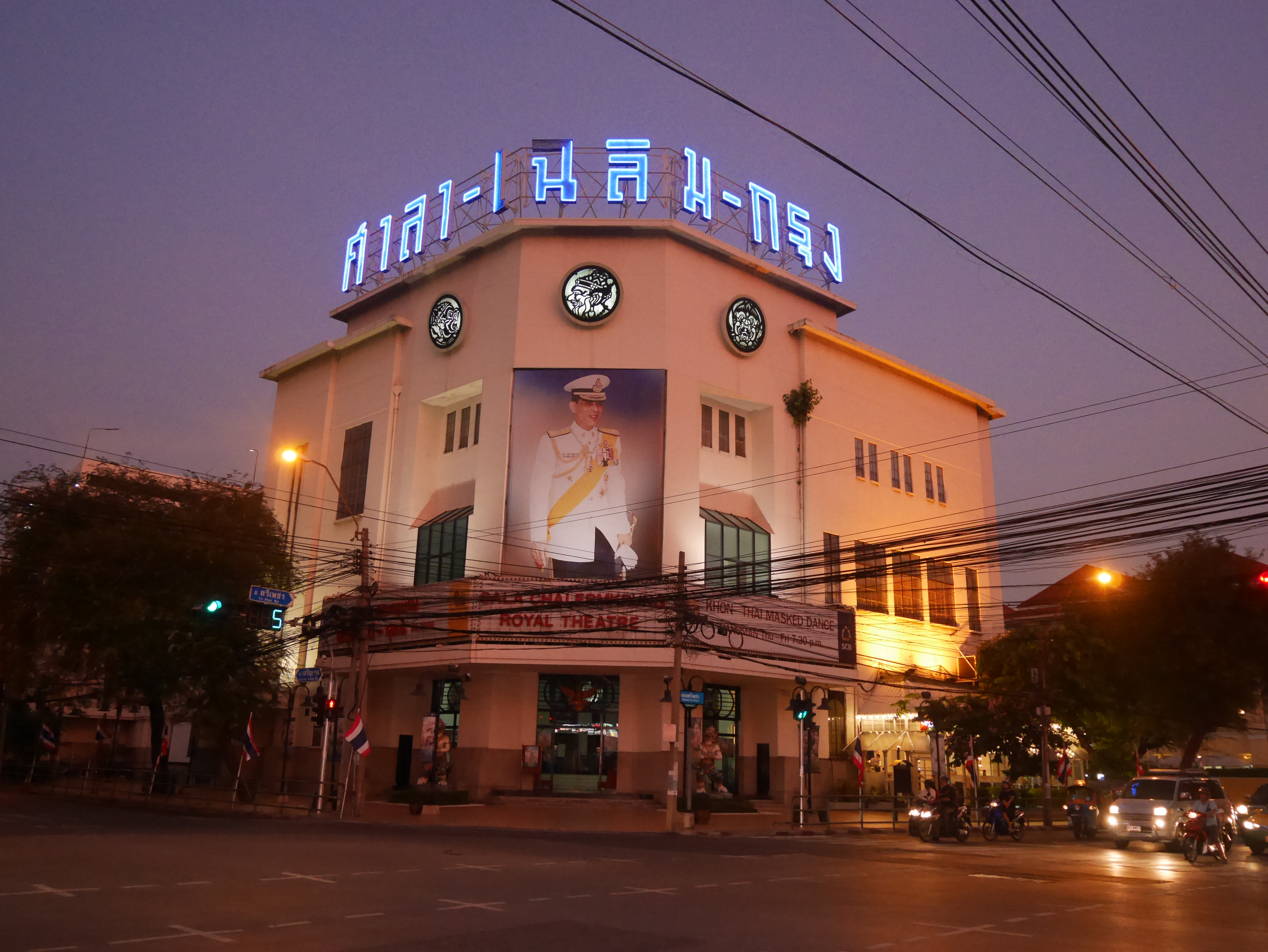
Chaloem Krung Intersection, the starting point of the road where it cuts with Charoen Krung and Ti Thong Roads

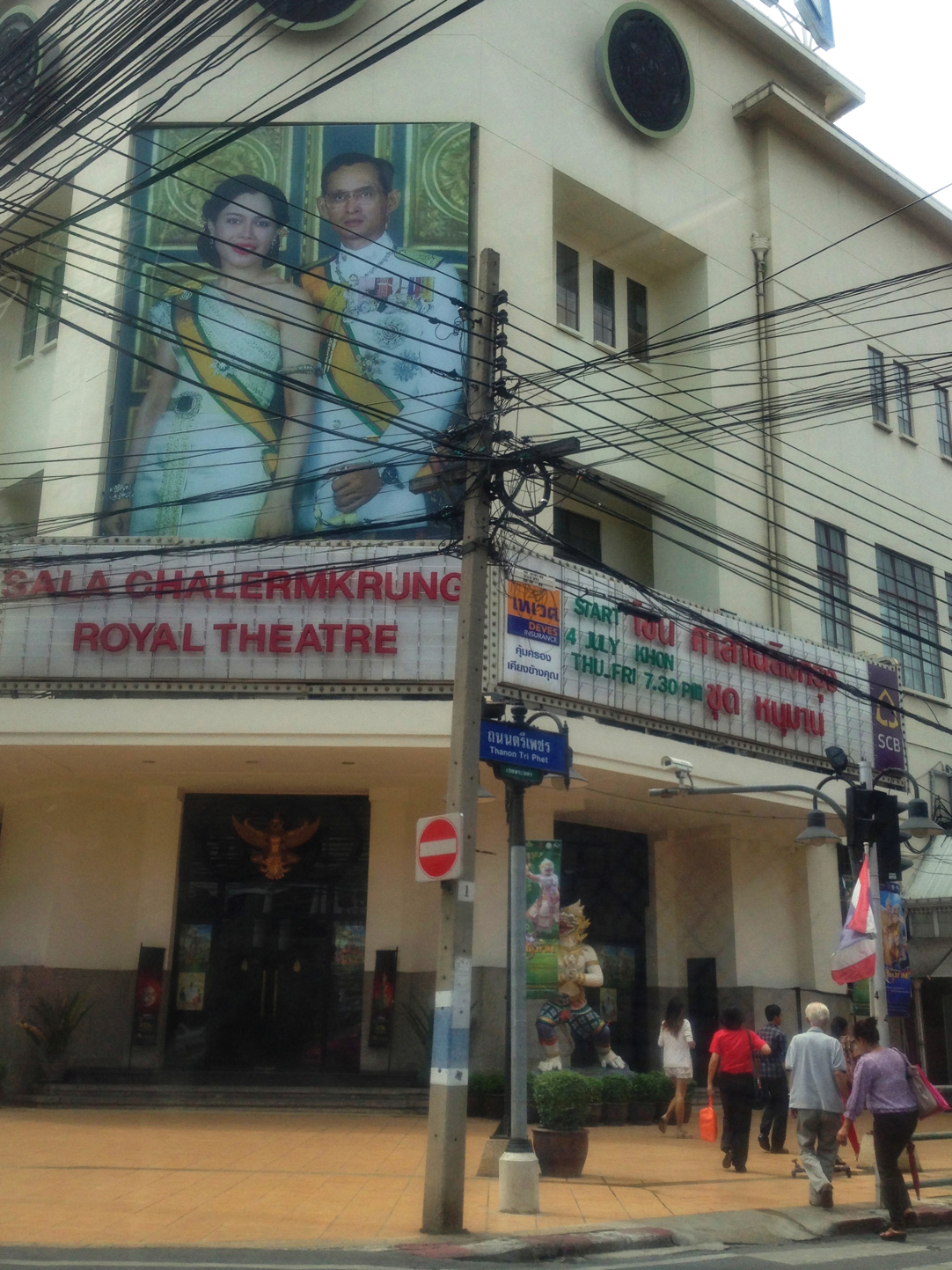
The road sign in front of Sala Chalermkrung Royal Theatre

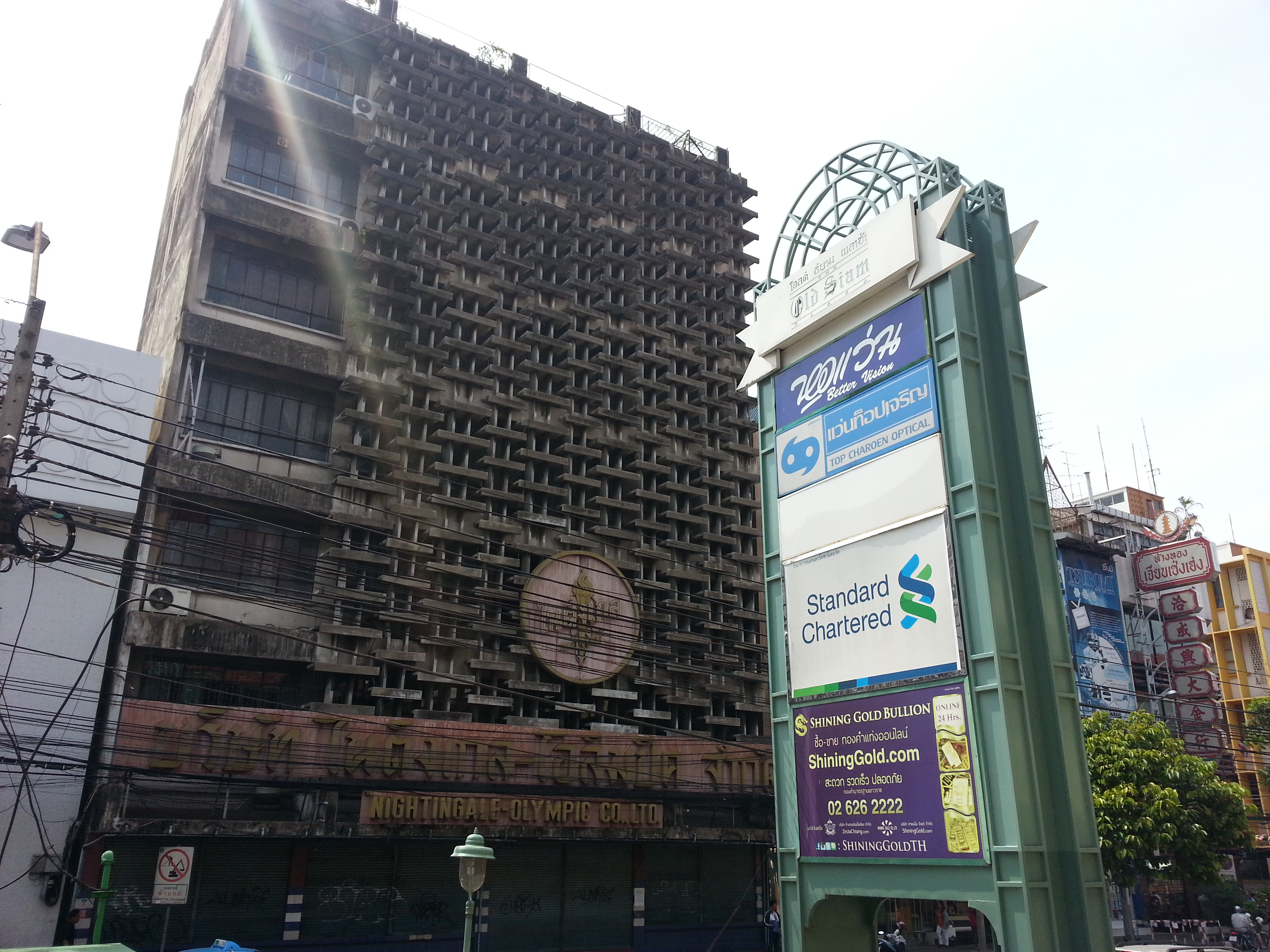
Nightingale–Olympic Department Store

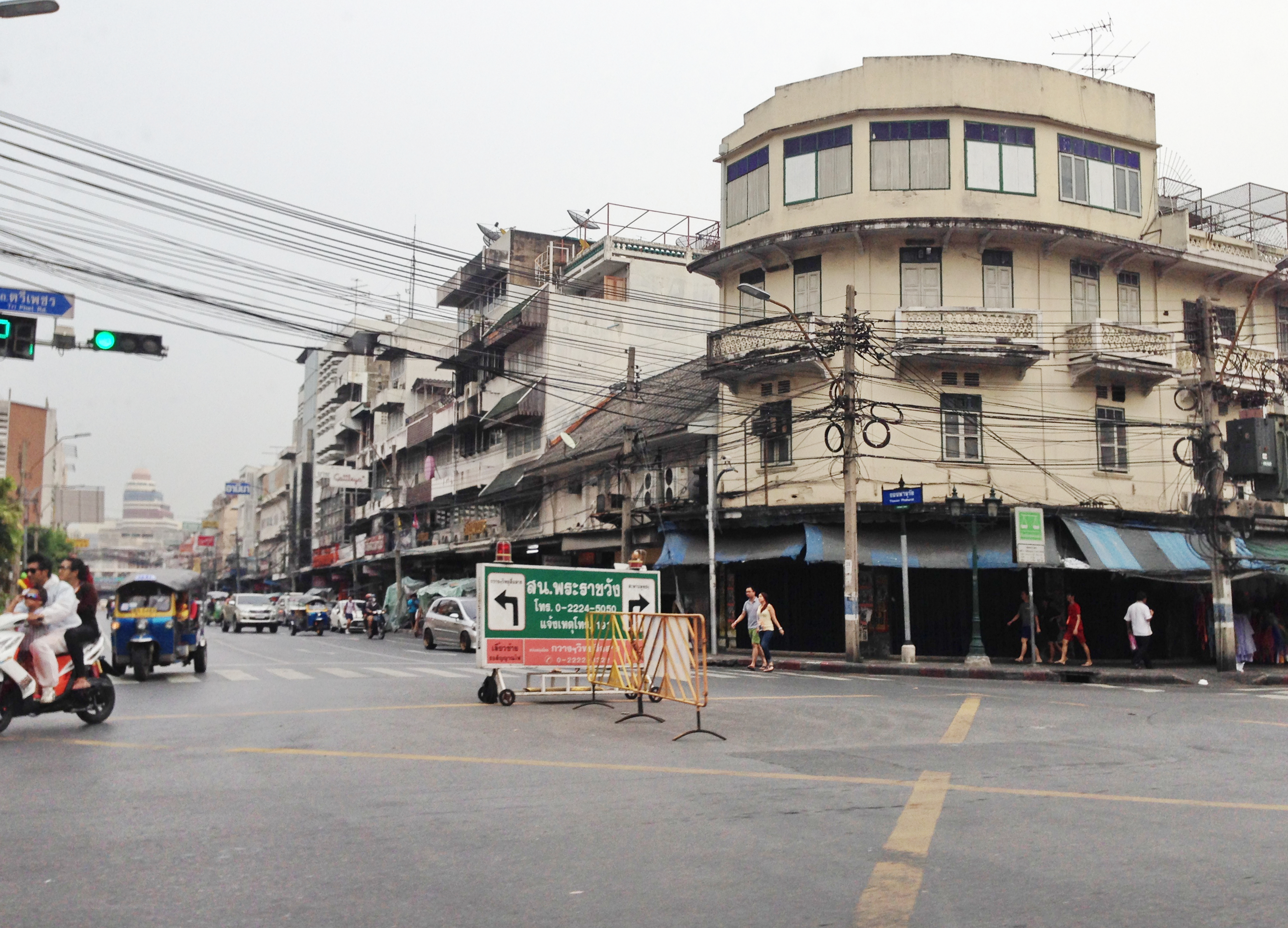
Phahurat Intersection, where it cuts with Phahurat Road

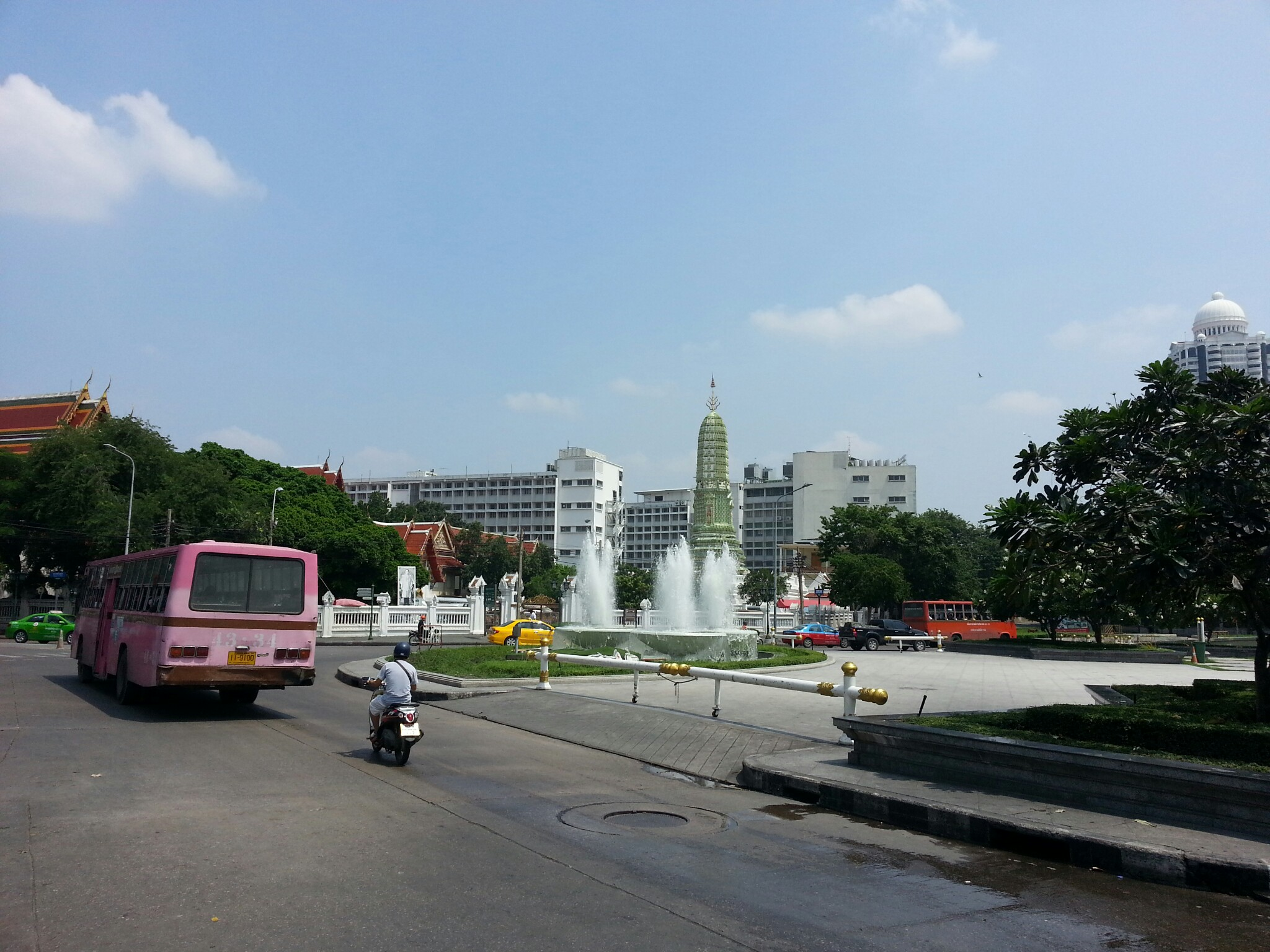
The end of the road where it joints with Chak Phet Road at the foot of the Memorial Bridge
