= Sala Chalermkrung Royal Theatre =

Theatre in Bangkok, Thailand

Coordinates: 13°44′48″N 100°30′0″E

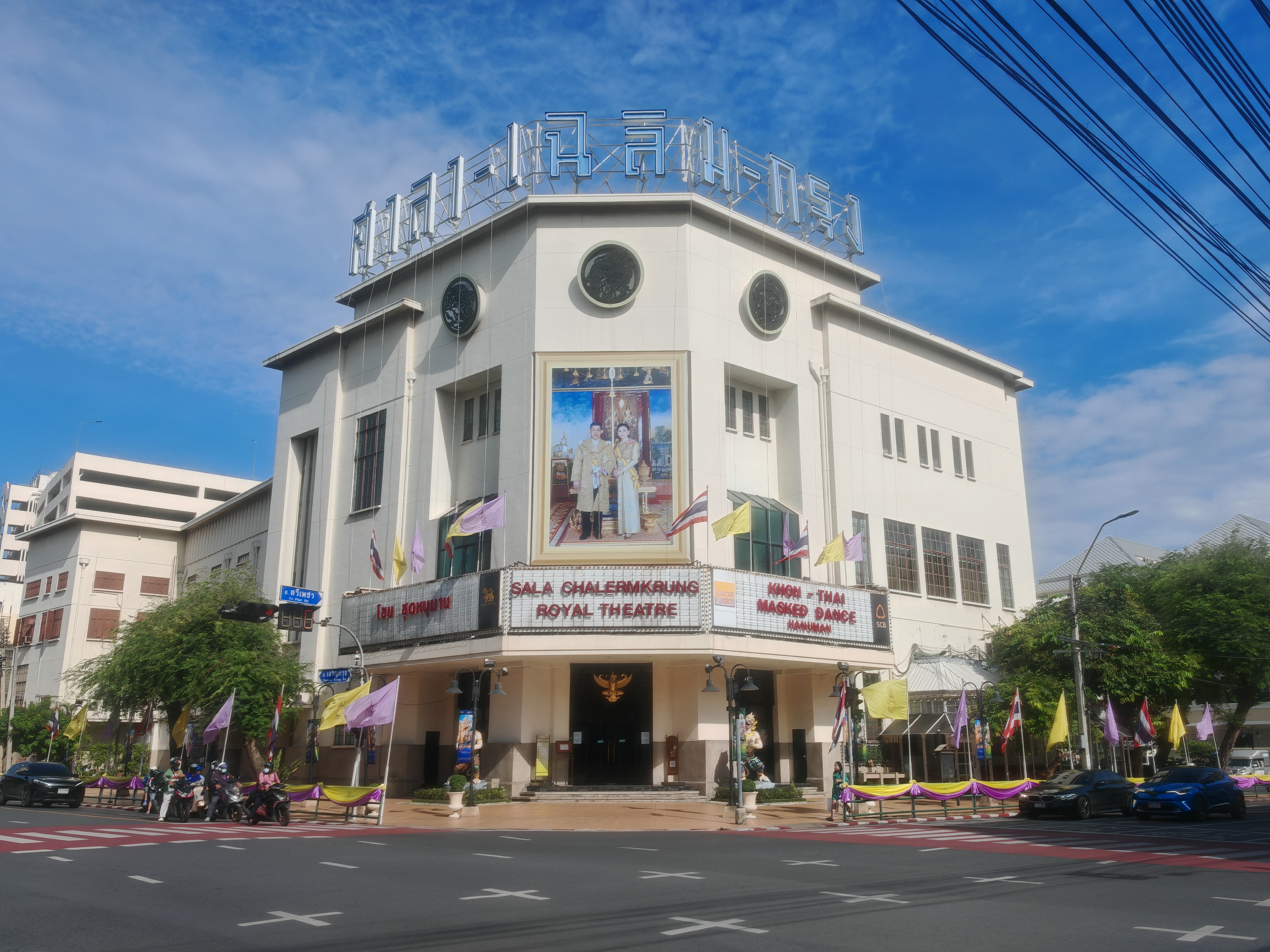
- Sala Chalermkrung Royal Theatre in 2025
- Interactive map of Sala Chalermkrung Royal Theatre
- Address: Phra Nakhon, Bangkok; Thailand
- Owner: Crown Property Bureau
- Type: Theatre

Construction
- Opened: 2 July 1933
- Rebuilt: 1992
- Years active: 1933 to present
- Architect: Prince Samaichaloem Kridakorn

Website
- http://www.salachalermkrung.com

Sala Chalermkrung Royal Theatre (Thai: ศาลาเฉลิมกรุง; RTGS: Sala Chaloem Krung) was originally a movie theatre in Bangkok, Thailand built in Modernist style on Charoengkrung Road. It was opened on 3 July 1933. After serving as a cinema for many years it now hosts performances of classical Thai dance.

== History ==
Construction of Sala Chalermkrung theatre was sponsored by King Prajadhipok as part of the celebrations in 1932 to mark the 150th anniversary of the founding of Bangkok. The name Sala Chalermkrung derives from this, meaning 'Pavilion to Celebrate the City'. The King was himself an enthusiastic supporter of movies and invested 9,000,000 Baht of his personal funds to construct the theatre.

The King chose as the architect for the project Mom Chao Samaichaloem Kridakorn who was at that time Chief Master Builder at the Department of Outer Palace. This was a bold choice since Kridakorn had only recently graduated in Beaux-Arts Architecture and such important roles had previously always been filled by Europeans. Prince Purachatra Jayakara a senior member of the Royal Family was appointed as the construction director and the Bangkok Dock Company was selected as the construction contractor. Phraya Sripipat Rattanarat Kosathipbodi (M. R. Mul Darakorn), the Director-General of the Department of Privy Purse, chose the site for the theatre at the intersection of Charoengkrung Road and Tripet Road in Wang Burapha area, the centre of the Capital's commercial district at that time.

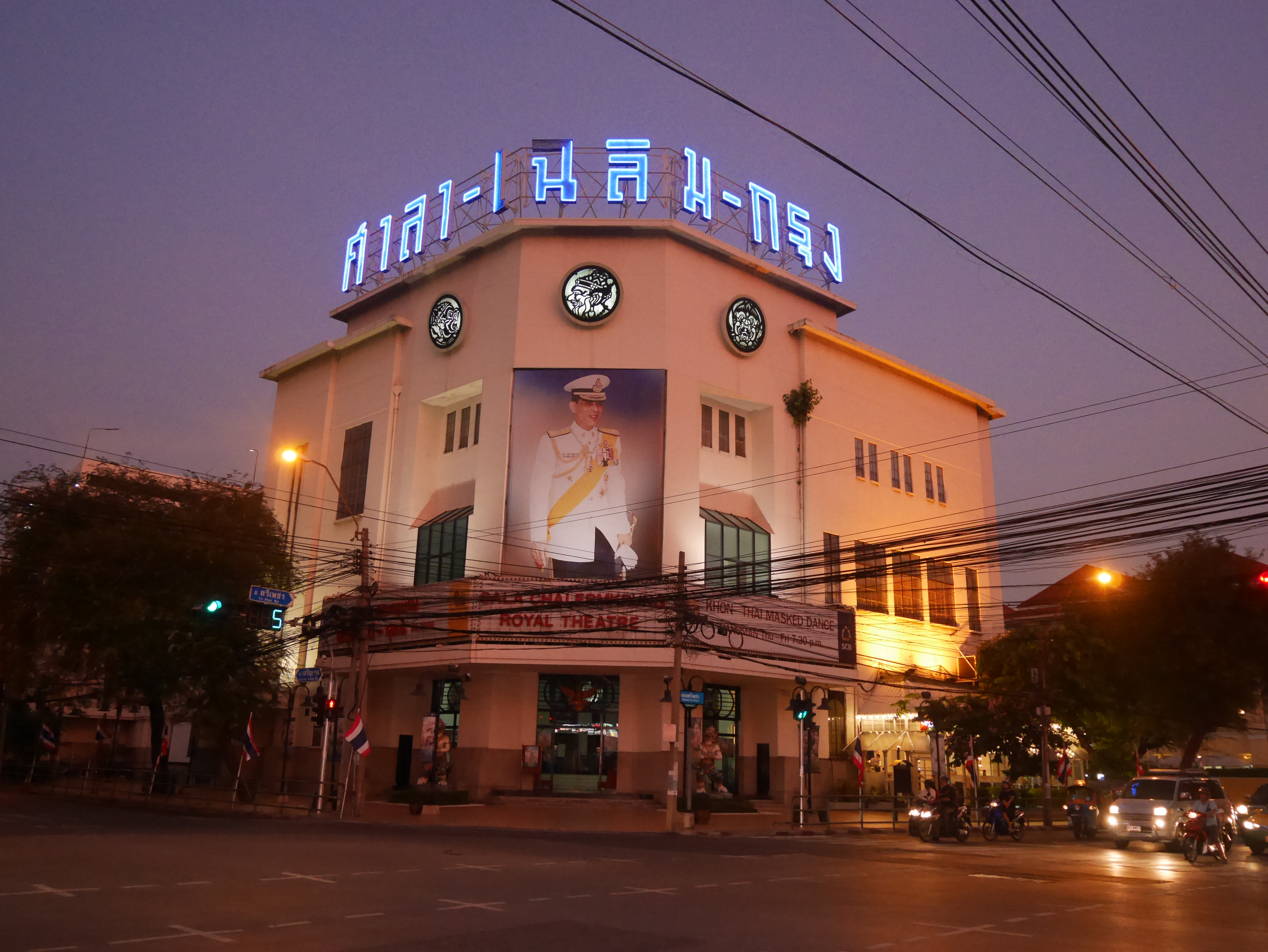
Royal Theatre at night

Bangkok's first movie screening took place in June 1897. and subsequently cinema became immensely popular in the Capital. However the movie houses were notorious for their squalor and disorderly behaviour. The Sala Chalermkrung theatre was therefore intended to provide Bangkok citizens with a clean, orderly and modern cinema. Built in Modernist style the theatre was equipped with the latest sound and lighting system, designed by Siamese engineer, Phraya Prakopyantrakit (Yon Yaiprayun). The neon lights on the top of the front facade displaying in Thai the name Sala Chalerm Krung were the largest in Asia. Plus the theatre was equipped with modern air-conditioning, a new experience for many Siamese at the time. The main auditorium seated 1,500 patrons whilst there was a smaller 350 seat auditorium plus private rooms for royal screenings as well as dance rooms and a dining salon.

The theatre opened to massive crowds on 2 July 1933. By this time however, the Siamese revolution of 1932 had displaced the king from his absolutist position and the opening was therefore presided over by Phraya Sripipat Rattanarat Kosathipbodi rather than the King himself. The cinema was operated by the Saha Cinema Company which had been established by the King himself but in post-revolution Siam control soon fell under the new government. King Prajadhipok is believed to have visited the theatre himself only twice.

== Renovation ==
After a long period of neglect and decline Sala Chalerm Krung was renovated in 1992. With the intended emphasis on traditional theatre rather than movies, the stage was widened and a hydraulic stage lift system installed. This has reduced seating to 600.
